= List of hospitals in Houston =

This is a list of hospitals in the Houston area sorted by name. There are more than 80 hospitals in Harris County and more than 125 in the Greater Houston area.

- Baylor St. Luke's Medical Center
- Ben Taub Hospital
- Clear Lake Regional Medical Center
- Cypress Fairbanks Medical Center
- HCA Houston Healthcare
- Houston Methodist Baytown Hospital
- Houston Methodist Clear Lake Hospital
- Houston Methodist Continuing Care Hospital
- Houston Methodist Hospital
- Houston Methodist Sugar Land Hospital
- Houston Methodist The Woodlands Hospital
- Houston Methodist West Hospital
- Houston Methodist Willowbrook Hospital
- Intracare Hospital North
- Lyndon B. Johnson General Hospital
- Memorial Hermann–Texas Medical Center
- Memorial Hermann Katy Hospital
- Memorial Hermann Memorial City Medical Center
- Memorial Hermann Northwest Hospital
- Menninger Clinic
- St. Joseph Medical Center
- Texas Children's Hospital
- Texas Orthopedic Hospital
- The Woman's Hospital of Texas
- TIRR Memorial Hermann
- University of Texas M.D. Anderson Cancer Center
- West Houston Medical Center
- Westbury Community Hospital
