= Beth Llewellyn McLaughlin =

American politician

Member-elect of the Texas House of Representatives from the 97th district
- Assuming office January 2027
- Succeeding: John McQueeney

Personal details
- Party: Democratic

Beth Llewellyn McLaughlin (born 1956/1957) is an American politician. A retired teacher at Southwest High School, she is the Democratic member-elect of the Texas House of Representatives from the 97th district.

== Biography ==
Beth Llewellyn McLaughlin was born in 1956 or 1957 in Portland, Oregon, one of five children (and three daughters) of a newspaper industry professional. She studied at the University of Nebraska–Lincoln, where she obtained a BA in French, German, and political science. She taught at Southwest High School in Fort Worth for 29 years before eventually retiring. Her education career also includes chairing the district's World Language Curriculum Adoption Committee, serving on the District Advisory Board and the Texas Textbook Adoption Committee for Languages Other Than English.

In 2012, McLaughlin joined the Kimbell Art Museum as a volunteer docent. She is also involved in community activism, and was vice president of the National Organization for Women's Tarrant County chapter. She has served as a board member for voter mobilization organizations Tarrant Together and Texans Defending Democracy.

McLaughlin ran in the 2018 Texas House of Representatives election in the 97th district. She lost to Republican incumbent Craig Goldman 53.2% to 44.9%.

In 2026, McLaughlin returned to run in the same district, by then held by John McQueeney. She named healthcare and public education as her priorities. After coming in second-place in the Democratic primary in March at 30.4%, she defeated Diane Symons 56.4% to 43.6% at the runoff in May. She later won the general election in November, defeating McQueeney 50.9% to 49.1%.

She was married to teacher John Paul McLaughlin until his death in 2023.
