= Texas A&M University Naresh K. Vashisht College of Medicine =

Medical school in Bryan, Texas, US

Texas A&M University College of Medicine
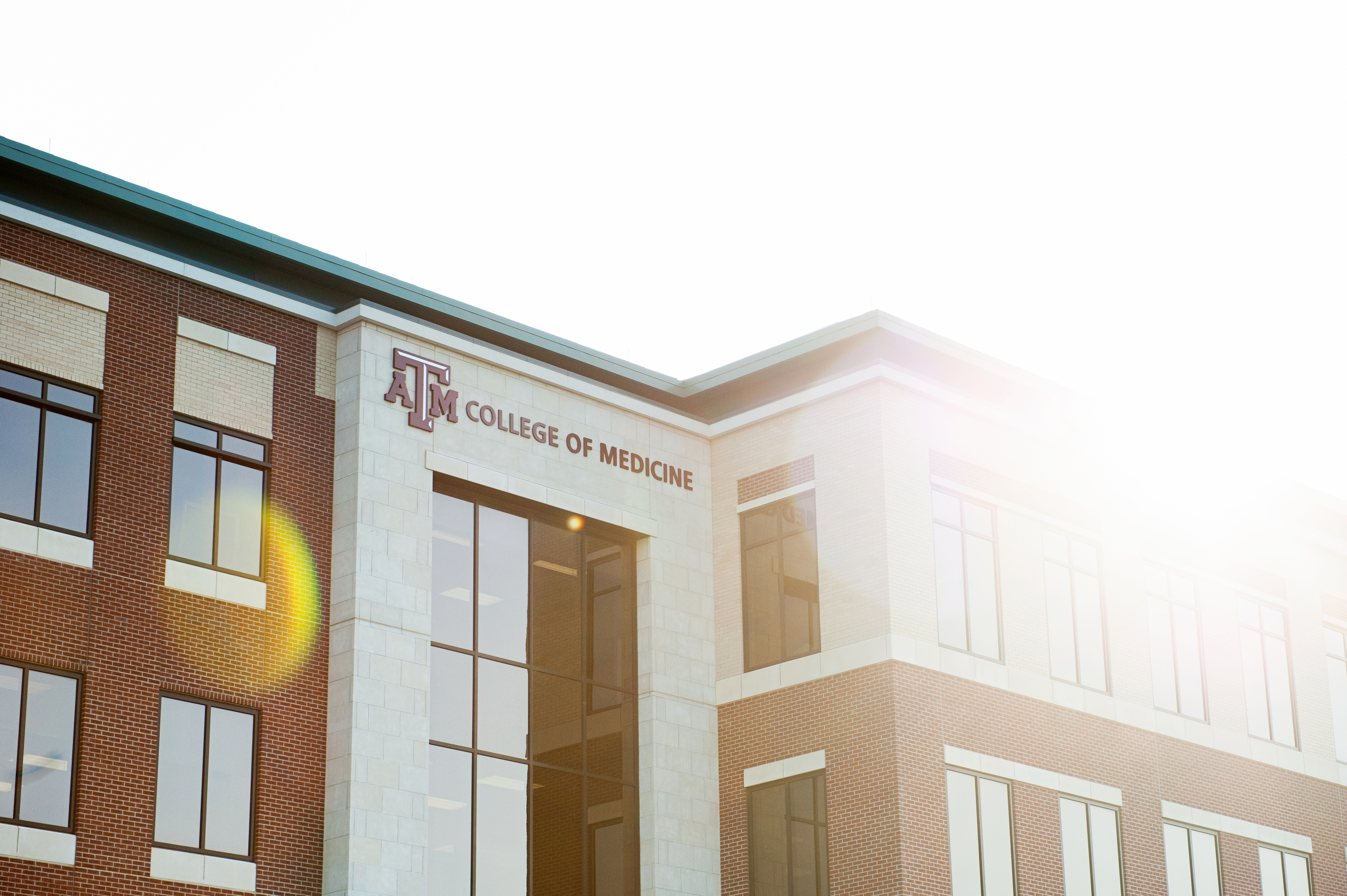
- Type: Public
- Established: 1977; 49 years ago
- Affiliations: Baylor Scott & White Health; Houston Methodist Hospital; CHI St. Joseph Health
- Dean: Amy L. Waer
- Students: 600+
- Location: Bryan, Texas, USA; 30.655484°N 96.343518°W
- Website: https://medicine.tamu.edu/

Texas A&M University College of Medicine is the medical school at Texas A&M University and a component of Texas A&M Health. The School offers M.D., M.D./Ph.D., M.D./M.P.H, M.D./M.B.A., M.D./M.Eng., and several other M.D./M.S. dual degree programs.

== History ==
Founded as the Texas A&M College of Medicine in 1977, the charter class of 32 students began their medical training on Texas A&M University's campus. 1981 marked the year the first medical degrees were awarded, and since then, more than 2,258 physicians have graduated from Texas A&M School of Medicine. In 1999, the College joined the newly created Texas A&M Health Science Center. During a series of Texas A&M organizational changes in 2021, the College of Medicine was redesignated the School of Medicine, only to revert to being a college in 2024. In July 2025, after receiving “the largest naming donation in the school's history”, the school was renamed again to the Naresh K. Vashisht Texas A&M College of Medicine.

== Training Facilities and Curriculum ==
The School's mission is to improve the health and well-being of the people of Texas through excellence in education, research and health care delivery. The MD curriculum consists of 1.5 years of pre-clinical curriculum followed by 2.5 years of clinical training.

== Campus Tracks ==
The School of Medicine operates 5 different campus tracks: 4 different sites around the state for the regular MD students and one site for the EnMed MD/MEng students.

Campus	Track	Clinical Sites	Training Timeline
Bryan–College Station (BCS)	MD	CHI St. Joseph Health Baylor Scott & White Medical Center-College Station	All 4 years of pre-clerkship and clerkship training in Bryan-College Station
BCS & Dallas-Fort Worth	MD	Baylor University Medical Center Cook Children's Medical Center	1 year of pre-clerkship training in BCS and then 3 years of pre-clerkship and clerkship training in Dallas-Fort Worth
BCS & Houston Willowbrook	MD	Houston Methodist Willowbrook Hospital	1.5 years of pre-clerkship training in BCS and then 2.5 years of clerkship training in Houston
BCS & Round Rock	MD	Baylor Scott and White Medical Center-Round Rock	1 year of pre-clerkship training in BCS and then 3 years of pre-clerkship and clerkship training in Round Rock
Houston Texas Medical Center	EnMed	Houston Methodist Hospital	All 4 years of pre-clerkship and clerkship training in Houston

== Research Centers, Institutes & Labs ==
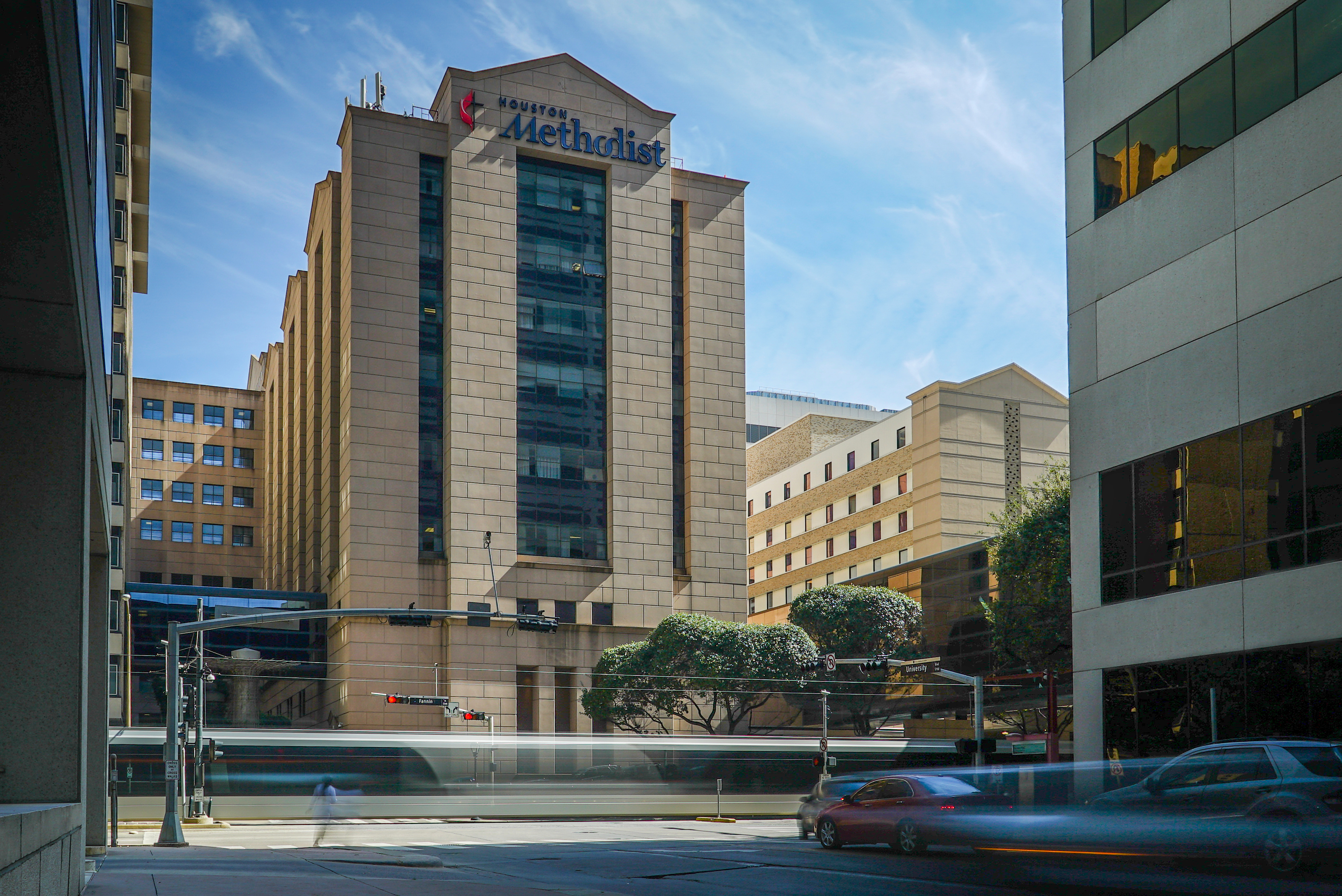
Houston Methodist Hospital, Houston, TX

- Houston Methodist Hospital
- Cardiovascular Research Institute
- Center for Airborne Pathogen Research and Tuberculosis Imaging
- Center for Health Systems and Design
- Center for Microencapsulation and Drug Delivery
- Huffines Institute for Sports Medicine and Human Performance
- Institute for Ocular Pharmacology
- Institute for Regenerative Medicine
- The Texas Brain and Spine Institute

== Notable physicians and researchers ==
- Mark M. Shelton, (MD Class of 1983), specialist in infectious diseases and pediatric AIDS at Cook Children's Medical Center in Fort Worth; Republican member of the Texas House of Representatives, 2009-2013
- Robert Stone (scientist), Director of The National Institutes of Health from 1973 to 1975; the vice president for health services and dean of the school of medicine at the University of New Mexico, dean of the School of Medicine of the University of Oregon Health Sciences Center and vice president of the Health Sciences Center, and dean of the Texas A&M Health Science Center College of Medicine.
