= Mark Shelton =

Mark Shelton may refer to:

- Mark Shelton (Australian politician), Speaker of the Tasmanian House of Assembly
- Mark M. Shelton, American pediatrician and member of the Texas House of Representatives
- Mark Shelton (footballer), English footballer
- Mark Shelton, American musician known as a member of Manilla Road
