= Carl R. Darnall Army Medical Center =

- Defense Health Agency
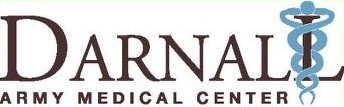

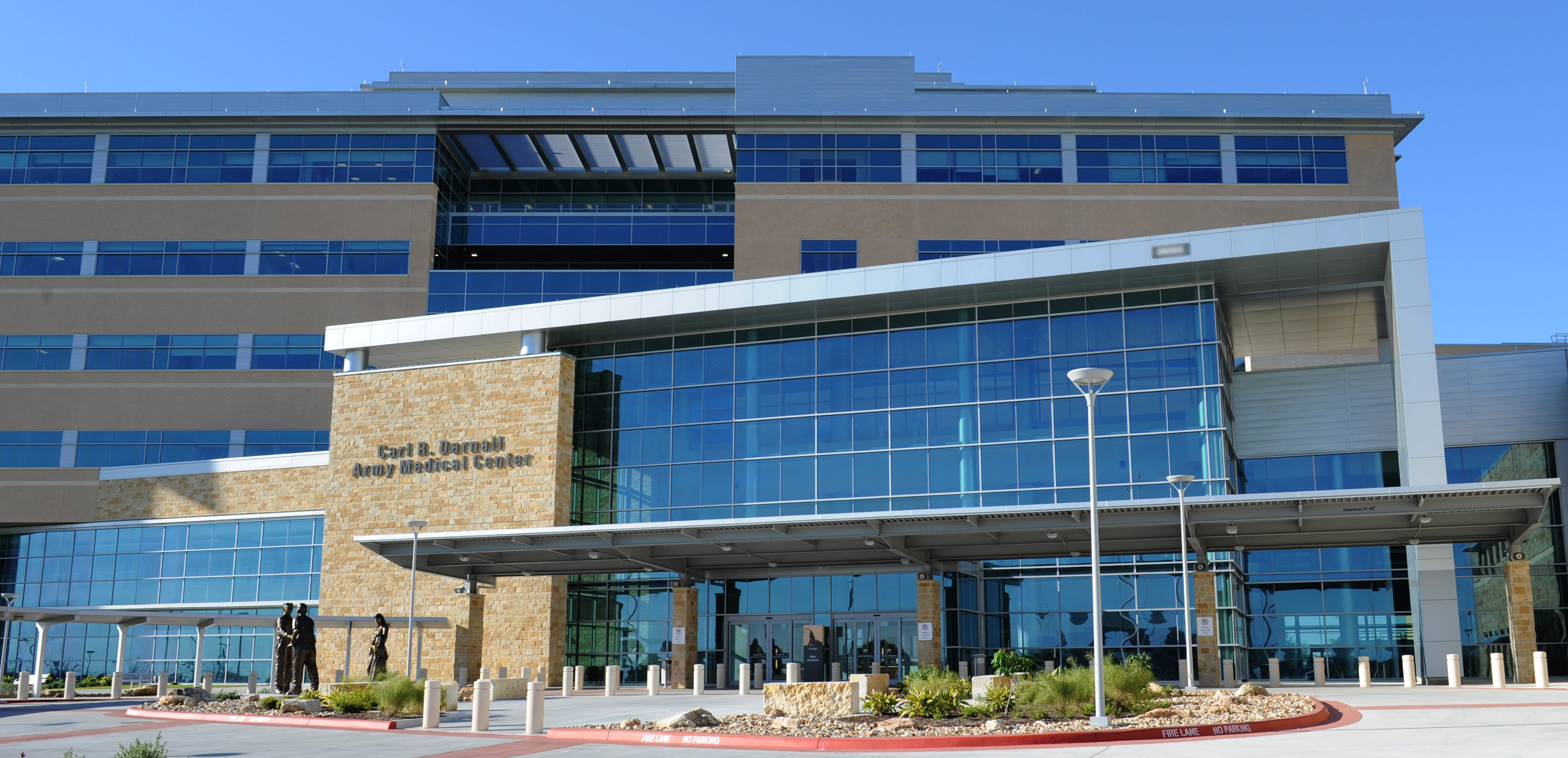
- Front facade of Darnall AMC's new facility

Geography
- Location: 36000 Darnall Loop, Fort Hood, Killeen, Texas, United States
- Coordinates: 31°07′51″N 97°46′24″W

Organization
- Care system: Tricare
- Type: Military hospital
- Affiliated university: Texas A&M Health Science Center College of Medicine; Baylor College of Medicine

Services
- Emergency department: Yes

Helipads
- Helipad: IATA: US-4163
Number	Length		Surface
Number	ft	m	Surface
H1

History
- Former name: Darnall Army Community Hospital
- Opened: 1965 (historic); 2016 (current facility)

Links
- Website: darnall.tricare.mil
- Lists: Hospitals in Texas
Troop Command – Carl R. Darnall Army Medical Center
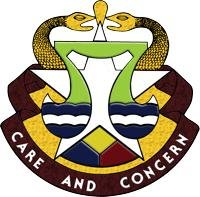
- Darnall's Distinctive Unit Insignia
- Active: 1965 - present
- Country: United States
- Branch: United States Army
- Type: Hospital
- Part of: Defense Health Agency
- Headquarters: Fort Hood, Texas
- Nickname: CRDAMC
- Motto: An Exceptional Experience Every Single Time.
Commanders
- Director: COL Richard Malish
- Sr. Enlisted Leader: CSM Elvin Medina

The Carl R. Darnall Army Medical Center is a United States Department of Defense medical facility at Fort Hood, Texas. It provides medical care to servicemembers and their families, along with veterans and their dependents, in and around the largest U.S. military installation in the world. Named after inventor of water chlorination Brigadier General Carl Rogers Darnall, MD., the core of the medical center is a state of the art 947,000-square-foot hospital. The facility opened in 2016, and includes a full primary care and emergency medical facility, including a level III trauma center, and specialized care in obstetrics and gynaecology, orthopedics, and behavioral health. The hospital provides treatment to nearly 3,000 patients daily. The medical center is one of the largest in the Military Health System, comprising more than 105 buildings in addition to the main facility, spread over Fort Hood, three local communities, and a clinic at the Red River Army Depot in Bowie County, Texas, outside of Texarkana. The medical center and its outlying facilities are staffed nearly entirely by uniformed servicemembers of the U.S. Army, however in 2019, the administrative control of the facility was shifted from United States Army Medical Command to the Defense Health Agency, an integrated joint Department of Defense combat support agency. All patients of the facility are insured and billed through Tricare, the health insurance system of the DoD. The medical center is led by Colonel Richard G. Malish.

== History ==
=== 1965: Darnall Army Community Hospital ===
On 5 April 1963, the Army broke ground at Fort Hood for the new Darnall Army Community Hospital, meant to replace a World War II era hospital. Constructed in the latest military design, the original building cost $6 million and was furnished with an additional $6 million of equipment. Darnall was dedicated on April 16, 1965. At the time, Darnall was the first of three permanent Army hospitals of the 200 to 300 bed size to open in the U.S. Built to support a one-division installation of 17,000 troops, the original structure was soon outgrown as Fort Hood expanded to a full-fledged corps size installation.

=== 1984: expansion ===
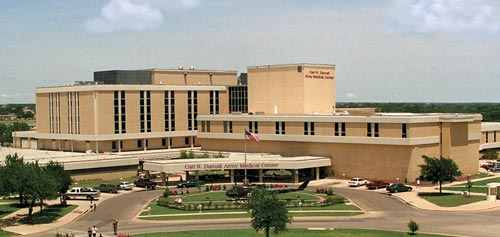
The original hospital after 1980's additions.

To meet the growing medical needs, the Army began a $49.7 million addition and reconstruction project in 1979 that was completed on December 13, 1984. By the completion of the 1984 project, Darnall had doubled in size. Outpatient clinic space tripled, the number of operating rooms increased from five to six, the number of delivery rooms from two to four, and a same day surgery Center with two smaller operating rooms was added. In addition, the entire interior of the original building was upgraded. By 1984, Darnall supported 39,000 active-duty personnel, 45,000 family members and 88,000 retired personnel and their family members residing in Fort Hood's 175 county support area.

=== 2003: Wartime support ===
In 2004 Darnall supported the deployment of the Texas National Guard and then its redeployment in December 2005. Since early 2003, more than 2,200 wounded and ill Soldiers evacuated from Iraq and Afghanistan have passed through Darnall. This was the highest total nationally for an Army hospital and third highest facility in the country behind Walter Reed and Eisenhower medical centers.

=== 2006: Redesignation as Army Medical Center ===
An expansion of the Darnall Army Community Hospital attempted to satisfy modern health care needs through upgrades and renovations. Upon completion, May 1, 2006, the Army redesignated the facility the Carl R. Darnall Army Medical Center. Soon however, it became clear that the result was a facility riddled with compromises which created a disjointed experience. The Army determined it required a brand-new facility with expanded services that would meet the Department of Defense's standards for care at the largest U.S. military base in the world.

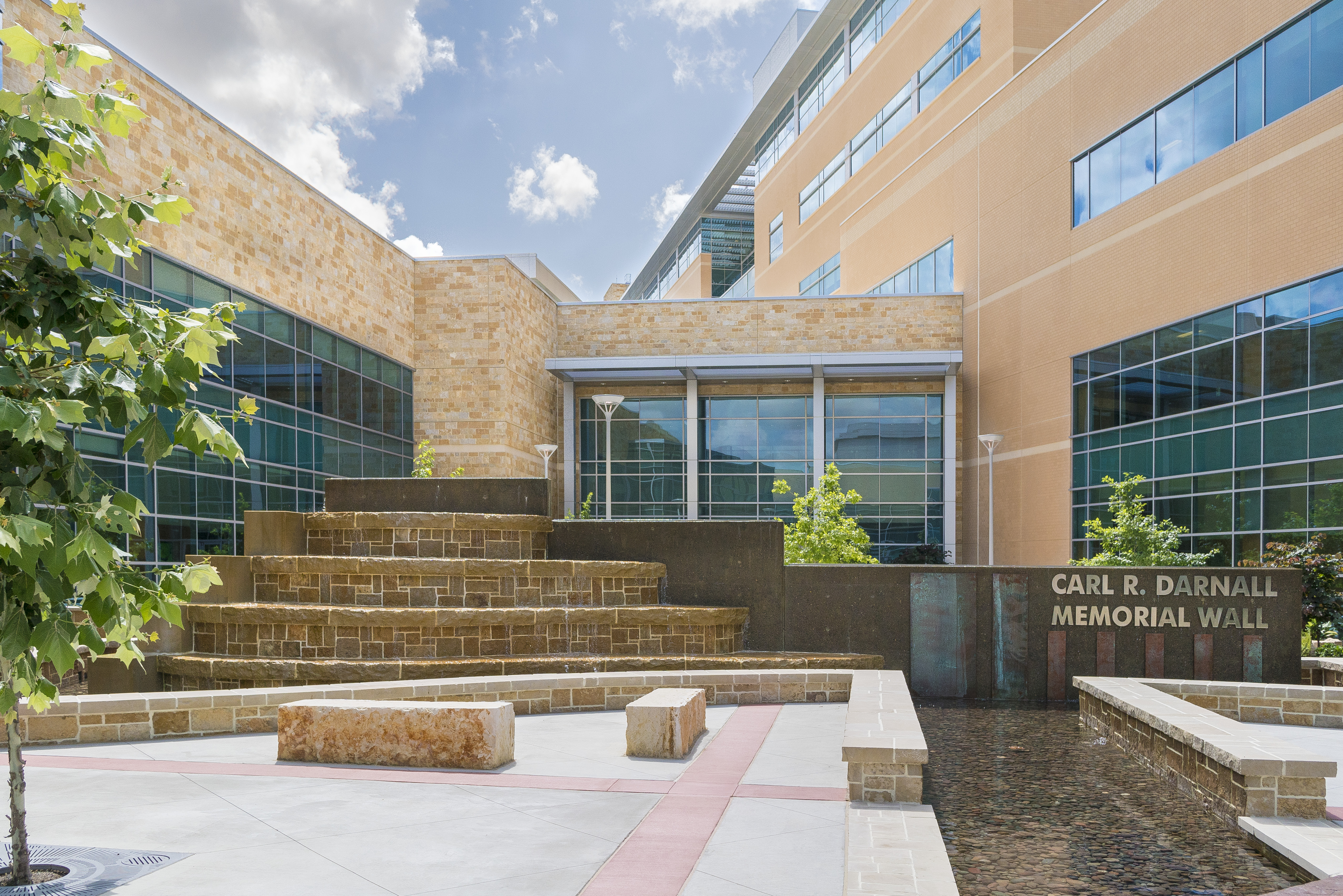
Memorial courtyard in the new Darnall facility

=== 2016: New facility ===
==== Development ====
In 2006, the Army announced that the new Fort Hood master plan designated a 40-acre (160,000 m^{2}) site near the Clear Creek Post Exchange for a new medical facility to replace the existing structure. As the financial crisis materialized in 2008 and 2009, the project was added to the slate of projects contracted under the American Recovery and Reinvestment Act, often known as the stimulus package.

Ground was broken for the new facility on December 6, 2010. The new facility opened in 2016.

==== Design ====
The 947,000-square-foot Carl R. Darnall Army Medical Center – one of the largest medical centers in the Department of Defense inventory – is nearly 60 percent larger than the original facility and includes a six-story hospital, three outpatient clinic buildings and three parking garages.

It is the last project completed under the American Recovery and Reinvestment Act, and also the program's largest contribution to the Department of Defense.

According to Major General John Uberti, deputy commanding general, III Corps and Fort Hood. The replacement hospital –

The new hospital's procurement was managed by the U.S. Army Corps of Engineers, and designed and built by a partnership of Balfour Beatty, McCarthy, HKS, and Wingler & Sharp. The Corps of Engineers core demand of the structure in design was durability. As a result, the facility is built on an entirely hardened concrete frame, surrounded by precast concrete panels. The design also called for hard wearing interior fittings, with entirely stainless steel flashings and double- and triple-pane windows. The building is also designed to be expanded as the years go by. When the floors were laid, accessible crawlspaces were built between each floor, with sufficient room for mechanics to easily conduct maintenance for HVAC, plumbing, medical gas system and a pneumatic tube system. The space allows future renovation and reconfiguring to occur floor by floor, with a standardized modular design in clinical spaces and floors which are adaptable to suit acuity levels and incremental growth. instead of needing to shut down hospital operations during construction.

For example, ambulatory care areas were designed to flex and adapt into adjacent areas with different functions. It is also designed to accommodate future technology driven by medical equipment advances.

Flexibility is an important part of the design. The medical center can grow both vertically and horizontally to keep up with the needs of soldiers and their families. Three stories can be added to the bed tower, and nearly 100,000 square feet of additional space can be added horizontally at the clinic level.

The medical center separates its services into what it calls 'portals of care', categorizing patient needs as primarily clinic-based or hospital-based. The hospital maintains a variety of service lines, but focuses especially on women's healthcare, orthopedics, and behavioral health. Major clinic-based portals of care contain primary and comprehensive departments, which include primary care, orthopedics and rehabilitation, women's outpatient services, emergency medicine, disability evaluation, surgery and multiple outpatient behavioral health clinics.

The facility opened in 2016, with Deputy Under Secretary of Defense John Conger, Congressman John Carter, and Fort Hood leadership in attendance. It is designed to be in service for the next 60 years.

== Facilities ==
=== Medical homes ===
- Copperas Cove Medical Home
- Harker Heights Medical Home
- Killeen Medical Home
- West Killeen Medical Home

=== Health clinics ===
- Russell Collier Health Clinic
- Thomas Moore Health Clinic
- Bennett Health Clinic
- Monroe Health Clinic
- Family Medicine Residency Clinic (FMRC)
- Troop Medical Clinic 12 (AVN)
- Troop Medical Clinic 14

== Capabilities and operations ==
Darnall now supports the 1st Cavalry Division and a number of the III Corps separate brigades. Darnall covers more than 42,000 active duty personnel and more than 145,000 family members and veterans within a 40-mile (64 km) radius.

As the new facility opened, the hospital moved to evolve and update its methodology for patient care, placing a new emphasis on “evidence-based medicine and patient-centered care".

He said they are using the McKinsey 7S Framework across all service lines in order to better understand the current state of the facility's processes. Colonel Gibson said the McKinsey framework is “A watershed model that addresses the critical role of coordination, rather than structure, in organizational effectiveness, [incorporating] strategy, structure, systems, shared values, skills and staff.”

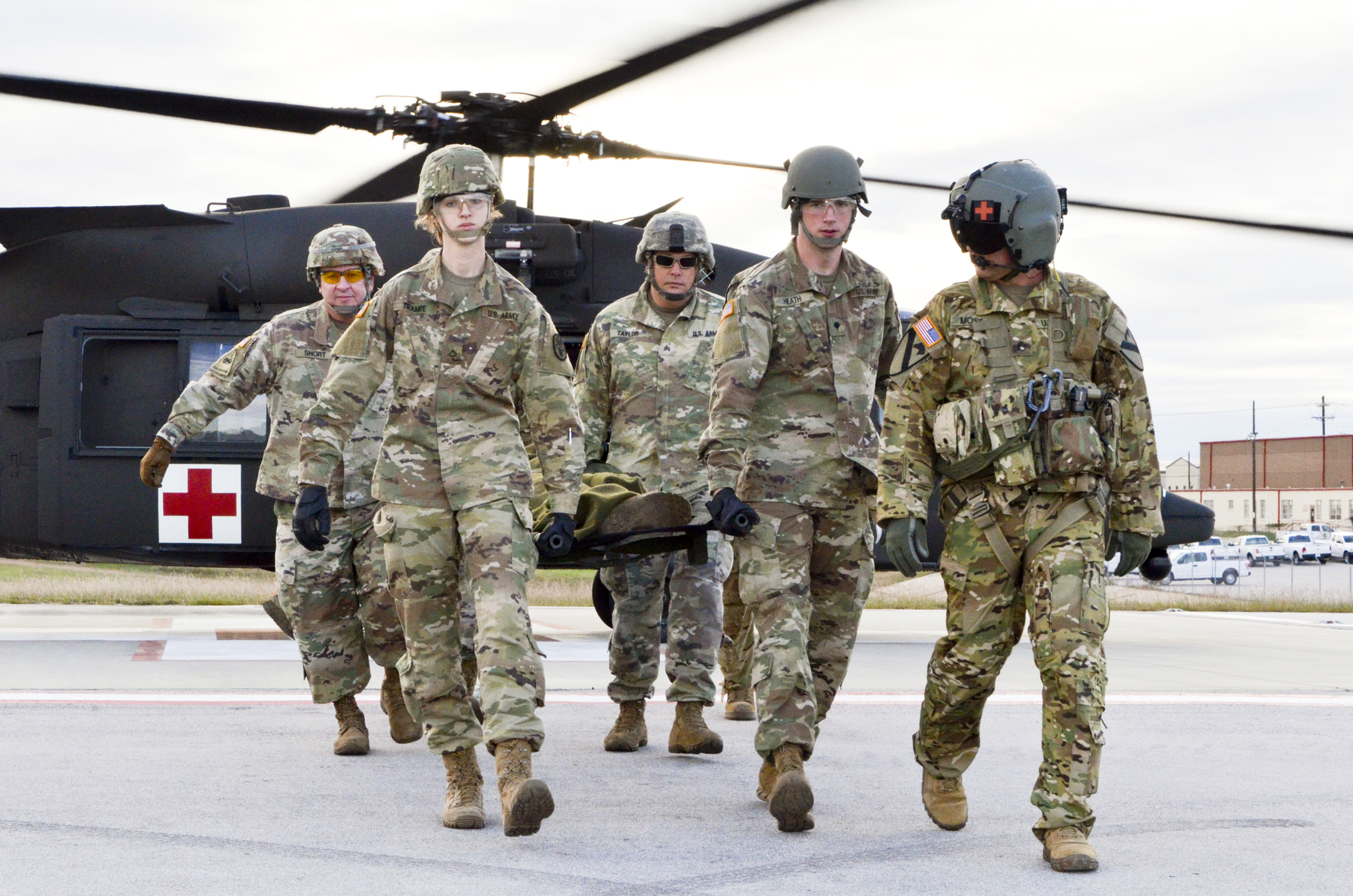
Darnall health specialists train to offload a mock patient from a UH-60 Blackhawk at the hospital helipad.

When the new hospital opened its doors in 2016 it replaced the old Darnall Army Medical Center that served the Fort Hood community since 1965. Initially, the old hospital was designed to serve 17,000 soldiers. Today, the new medical center serves more than 100,000 beneficiaries, which includes active duty soldiers, their families and retirees.

Darnall averages seven births a day. On an average day, the Darnall staff handle 3,867 outpatient visits, 26 surgeries, 31 admissions, 170 emergency department visits and fill 5,000 prescriptions.

== Facility commander ==
Command of CRDAMC is a Colonel's billet.

Photo	Name	Start of term	End of term
	Colonel Steven Braverman, M.D.		June 23, 2011
	Colonel Patrick Sargent	June 23, 2011	April 24, 2013
	Colonel Roger Gallup, M.D. (interim)	April 24, 2013	June 28, 2013
	Colonel Patricia Darnauer	June 28, 2013	June 1, 2015
	Colonel Mark Thompson	June 1, 2015	July 7, 2017
	Colonel David R. Gibson	July 7, 2017	July 3, 2019
	Colonel Richard Malish	July 3, 2019	July, 2021
