= Judith Martin Cadore =

U.S. family practitioner

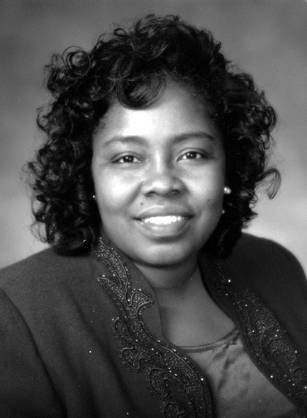
- Born: 1957 (age 68–69); Bay City, Texas, U.S.
- Education: Massachusetts Institute of Technology; University of Texas Medical Branch
- Children: 3
- Scientific career
- Fields: Family medicine
- Workplaces: University of Texas Medical Branch; San Jacinto Methodist Hospital

Judith Martin Cadore (née Martin; born 1957) is a U.S. family practitioner who serves rural populations prone to health care disparities in the Bay City, Texas area. She was previously a faculty member at the San Jacinto Methodist Hospital and a clinical instructor and assistant community professor in the department of family medicine at the University of Texas Medical Branch.

== Life ==
Cadore was born in Bay City, Texas in 1957 to Mr. and Mrs. Rudolph Martin. Her grandmother, Virginia Brown Gaskin, served as one of her mentors. In 1976, when she graduated as the first African-American valedictorian from Bay City High School, Cadore was denied the opportunity to give the traditional valedictory address and lead the class in the graduation ceremonies. Cadore attended Massachusetts Institute of Technology (MIT) through the National Merit Scholarship Program. She pursued a double major in chemistry and creative writing. While there, she received the Bolt Prize for Poetry, Prose and Manuscript and was named the Eugene McDermott Scholar. Graduating from MIT in 1980, she remained in Boston to work as a research chemist for Water Associates while doing graduate work at Harvard University. In 1984, she returned to Texas to study medicine. She was a Kempner Scholar at the University of Texas Medical Branch.

Completing medical school in 1990, Cadore remained at the University of Texas Medical Branch in Galveston for her family practice residency and continued there as a clinical instructor and assistant community professor in the department of family medicine. Later, in 1998, she left her faculty position at San Jacinto Methodist Hospital in order to pursue a private family practice. First working with an all-white, all-male practice in Texas City, Cadore later practiced with Edith Irby Jones in Houston and is now a solo practitioner in Bay City. She serves rural populations prone to health care disparities.

Cadore is the director of the "Sunshine Choir," a children's choir in the Third Ward, Houston. She and her husband Michael, a professional chef and caterer she met in Boston, live in Houston with their three children. In 1998, she raised concerns regarding racial insensitivity to the board of the Clear Creek Independent School District.
