= Jim Denison =

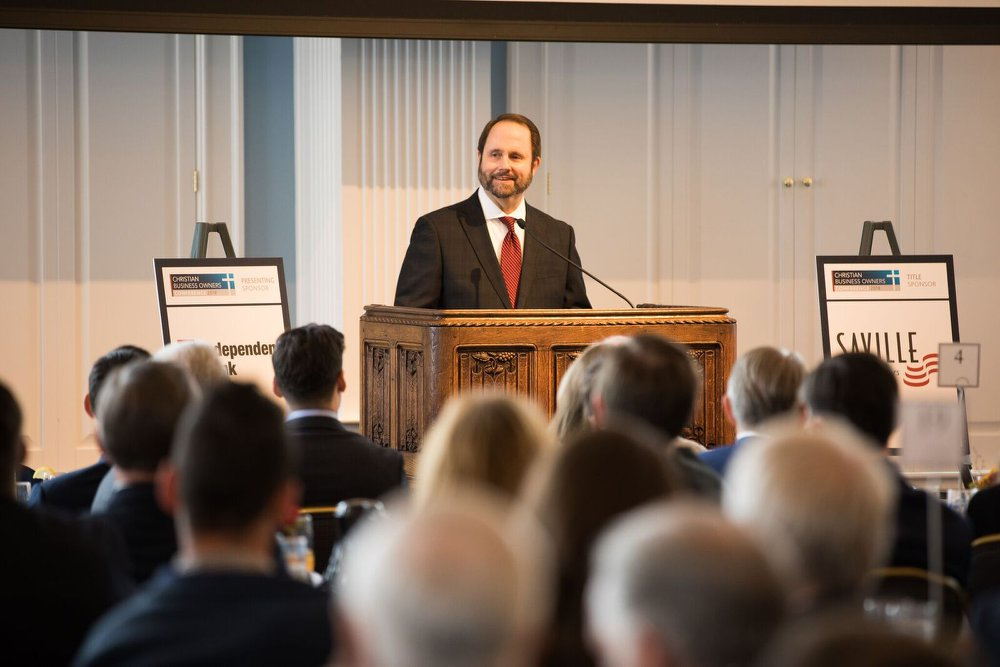
- Denison at Dallas Baptist University

Personal life
- Born: James Denison; May 20, 1958 Houston, Texas, U.S.
- Spouse: Janet Denison (m. 1980)
- Children: 2
- Education: Houston Baptist University Southwestern Baptist Theological Seminary Dallas Baptist University
- Website: denisonforum.org

Religious life
- Religion: Christianity (evangelical Protestantism)
- Denomination: Texas Baptists
- Profession: Cultural Apologist
- Ordination: College Park Baptist Church (Houston)

Senior posting
- Previous post: Park Cities Baptist Church (Dallas); Second Ponce de Leon Baptist Church (Atlanta); First Baptist Church Midland (Midland); Southwestern Baptist Theological Seminary; New Hope Baptist Church (Mansfield)

Jim Denison (born 1958) is an American author, speaker, and the CEO of Denison Ministries.

== Early life and education ==
Denison was born in 1958. He has both a Ph.D. in Philosophy of Religion and a Master of Divinity from Southwestern Baptist Theological Seminary and a Doctor of Divinity degree from Dallas Baptist University.

== Career ==
Denison was the senior pastor of Park Cities Baptist Church in Dallas, Texas, from 1998 to 2009. He served as pastor of Second-Ponce de Leon Baptist Church in Atlanta from 1994 to 1998, and from 1988 to 1994, he pastored First Baptist Church Midland.

In February 2009, he cofounded Denison Forum, one of four brands within Denison Ministries. It was formerly known as the Center for Informed Faith, an independent ministry hosted by the Baptist General Convention of Texas.

Denison writes The Daily Article, a weekday email newsletter that comments on current issues through a biblical lens. He holds a number of fellowships, including:

- Resident Scholar for Ethics with Baylor Scott & White Health
- Senior Fellow with the 21st Century Wilberforce Initiative
- Scholar Fellow with CEO Forum
- Senior Fellow for Global Studies at Dallas Baptist University
- Senior Fellow with the International Association of Christian Educators

Denison has spoken on the topics of radical Islam, geopolitics, and medical ethics.

== Selected publications ==
Denison's perspectives have been published in the Huffington Post, Religion News, the Baptist Standard, Fox News, Patheos, the Dallas Morning News, Baptist News Global, Faithwire, and the Christian Post.

He is the author of multiple books including:

- The Coming Tsunami: Why Christians Are Labeled Intolerant, Irrelevant, Oppressive, and Dangerous—and How We Can Turn the Tide
- Respectfully, I Disagree: How to Be a Civil Person in an Uncivil Time
- How Does God See America?
- Biblical Insight to Tough Questions: Vols. 1–10
- Bright Hope for Tomorrow: How Jesus' Parables Illuminate Our Darkest Days
- Radical Islam: What You Need to Know
- The Bible -- You Can Believe It: Biblical Authority in the Twenty-First Century
- Myth and the Manger
- Life on the Brick Pile: Answers to Suffering from the Letters of Revelation
- Seven Crucial Questions About the Bible

== Personal life ==
Denison and his wife, Janet, live in Tyler, Texas. They have two married sons and four grandchildren.
