= San Isidro Parkway =

Parkway in Laredo, Texas, USA

San Isidro Parkway is a 1-mile-long, four-lane divided parkway that traverses east–west in North Laredo, Texas. Its easternmost terminal point is the intersection of International Blvd and itself. The westernmost terminal point is currently a few feet west of Spendrift Road. Recently, construction has begun again on expansion of the roadway towards the west. Eventually, San Isidro Parkway will connect to I-35 somewhere between Shiloh Blvd. and Loop 20. The only major road that it crosses is McPherson Rd.

== Places along San Isidro Parkway ==
- Doctors Hospital of Laredo
- United Day School
