= Houston Orthopedic and Spine Hospital =

Coordinates: 29.7101°N 95.3998°W

- Houston Orthopedic and Spine Hospital

Geography
- Location: 5410 West Loop South, Bellaire, TX 77401, Bellaire, Texas, United States

Organization
- Care system: For-Profit
- Type: Private Boutique Hospital

Services
- Standards: Accredited by AAHC
- Emergency department: Yes
- Beds: 64

Links
- Website: http://www.surgicalhospital.com
- Lists: Hospitals in Texas

Houston Orthopedic and Spine Hospital is the number one rated hospital in Houston for surgery according to Consumer Reports. Located in Bellaire, Texas, it was originally Foundation Medical Hospital but then changed its name to Houston Orthopedic and Spine Hospital. The building next to the hospital is still called Foundation Medical Tower. Commonly known as HOSH, it is an orthopedic hospital with some teaching involved. HOSH sometimes takes residents and allows them to view surgeries and learn about the profession. HOSH is one of the most well-recognized hospital in the city, state, and nation.

== History ==
Previously named Foundation Hospital, they changed the name to Houston Orthopedic and Spine Hospital. HOSH has a small history with it only being about 10 years old when they opened the doors around 2004. The hospital was also founded by a group of doctors. HOSH has a governing board made up of physicians and administration which has leadership over the hospital. The founding physician partners are Board Certified and many have affiliations with Baylor College of Medicine and University of Texas Medical School.

== Rankings and recognition ==
"In the Houston area, Consumer Reports says the top hospital for surgery in our area is Houston Orthopedic and Spine Hospital in Bellaire." In terms of the nation, HOSH is ranked in the top 1% of the best hospitals, top 5% for patient experience, and top 10% for spine surgery. HOSH is largely recognized for the work that they do on hip and knee replacements. It has a five star rating for "total knee replacement and total hip replacement." More awards, rankings and recognitions can be found on their website as there is a longer list there.

== Services ==
Houston Orthopedic and Spine hospital has a long list of available services.

- List of Surgical Procedures ranging from A to Z can be found on their website
- For curious patients, a list of medical conditions can also be found on their website
- There are some non-surgical solutions that can be done since surgery is always the last option in HOSH. For example, a fitness center is always available to patients who would like to work out and/or do some physical therapy when they would like.
- As stated before, physical therapy is available for patients who either underwent surgery or a traumatic event. There is a wide range of PT equipment that helps patients get the closest to being how they were before along the lines of function.
- Imaging services like MRI, CT scan, X-ray, Ultrasound and Fluoroscopy are offered along with "full body, head and neck, gastrointestinal and pain management exams as well as myelograms."
- Sports medicine services are offered by a group of certified "orthopedic surgeons, sports medicine physicians, physician assistants, physical therapists and nurses" at HOSH and focus on the patient's athletic current and future career.
- Lab services are offered with a "full-service blood bank" and a laboratory that is in the hospital.
- Emergency/Urgent Care is available 24/7, 7 days a week. Since HOSH is a private hospital, their Emergency/Urgent care only ranges from "minor to mild orthopedic and spine injuries".
- Pain Management is offered to patients in the form of an epidural and nerve block.
- HOSH has an "Anesthesia Department staffed entirely by board certified physicians" that have more than a decade of experience in anesthesia.

== Concierge Program ==
HOSH has a concierge program which brings international patients to get their surgery done in the US in Houston Orthopedic and Spine Hospital. A concierge can assist international patients, give them Oasis luxury suites, help with travel information and even give referrals to physicians.

== Education ==
Being a partial teaching hospital, HOSH's website has a video library that has educational videos and seminars that are available for download. The videos include presurgery classes, exercise routines, medical conditions, pain management, sports medicine, anesthesia, lab services, and emergency/urgent care. Although these videos are mainly for curious patients, they are also very educational for non-patients.

== Pharmacy ==
HOSH has in on-site pharmacy that prescribes medication for inpatient use. It is located in the hospital section near the adjacent building which the doctor's offices are located in. In that building, there is an out-patient pharmacy for patients who have been released and are in need of medication.
