= Baylor Scott & White Medical Center – Plano =

Coordinates: 33.014°N 96.791°W

- Baylor Scott & White Health

Geography
- Location: 4700 Alliance Boulevard, Plano, Texas, Collin County, Texas, United States

Organization
- Type: Medical center
- Network: Baylor Scott & White Healthcare

Services
- Beds: 160

History
- Founded: 2004

Links
- Website: www.bswhealth.com/locations/hospital/plano
- Lists: Hospitals in Texas

Baylor Scott & White Medical Center – Plano, commonly referred to as Baylor Plano, is a medical center in Plano, Texas. Founded in 2004, the center is part of the larger Baylor Scott & White healthcare system. The hospital has a 5-star overall rating the highest rating from the Center for Medicare & Medicaid ("CMS").

== About ==
The full-service acute care hospital in Plano, TX, has been caring for the local community since 2004.

The hospital has 160 licensed beds and offer a broad range of services, including oncology, digestive disease, weight loss surgery, scoliosis, gastroenterology, orthopedics, pulmonology, neurology, neurosurgery and interventional radiology.

== Scandal ==
The center is notable for being one of the workplaces of Dr. Christopher Duntsch, a neurosurgeon convicted in 2017 of injury to an elderly person and assault for gross medical malpractice. Duntsch performed 33 surgeries that resulted in the maiming or death of his patients. Baylor-Plano failed to report Duntsch either to the Texas Medical Board or the National Practitioner Data Bank, instead allowing him to resign and offering a letter indicating that there were no areas of concern with regard to his performance.
