= Craig Goldman =

American politician (born 1968)

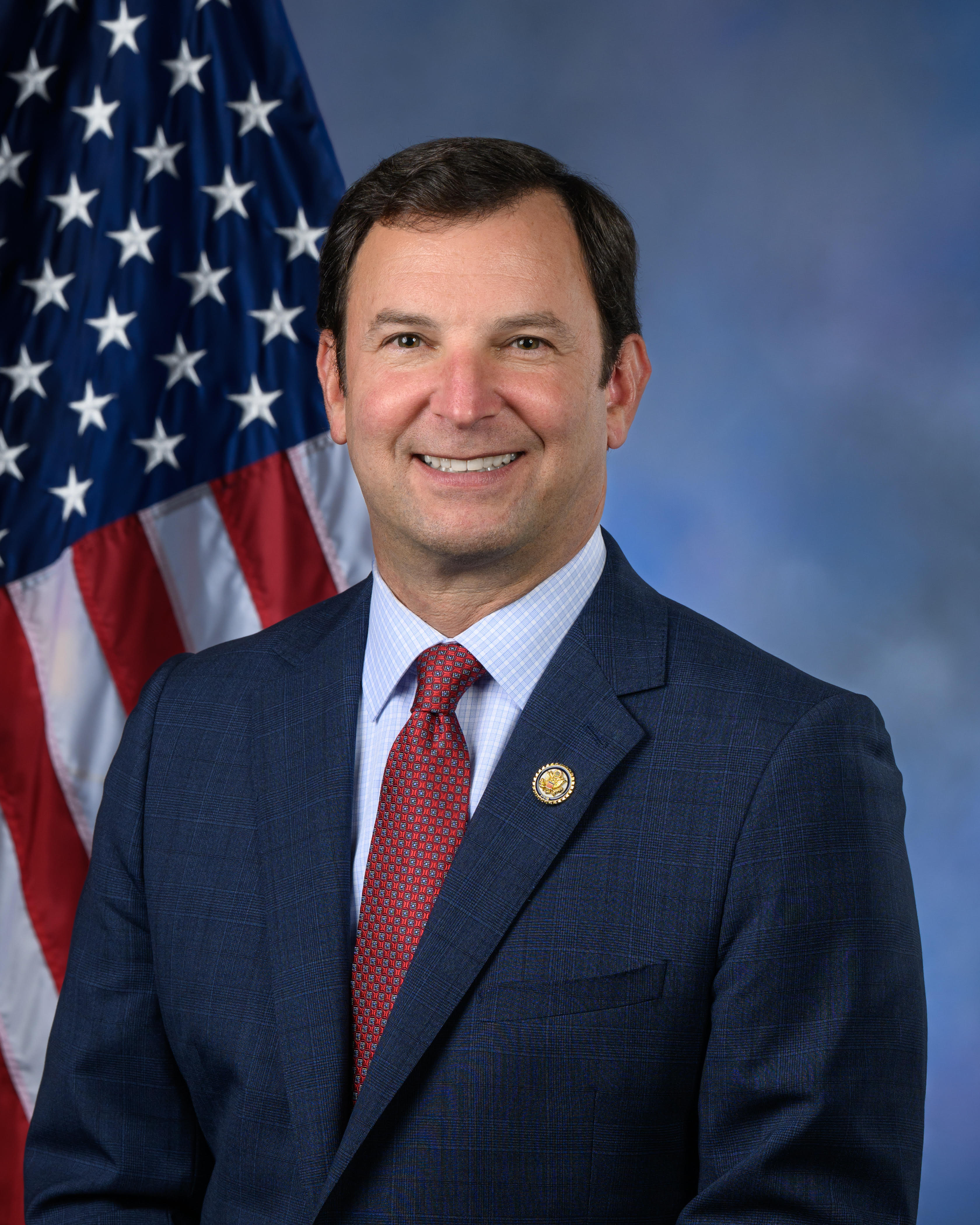
- Official portrait, 2025

Member of the U.S. House of Representatives from Texas's 12th district
- Incumbent
- Assumed office January 3, 2025
- Preceded by: Kay Granger

Majority Leader of the Texas House of Representatives
- In office January 10, 2023 – April 3, 2024
- Preceded by: Jim Murphy
- Succeeded by: Tom Oliverson

Member of the Texas House of Representatives from the 97th district
- In office January 8, 2013 – January 3, 2025
- Preceded by: Mark M. Shelton
- Succeeded by: John McQueeney

Personal details
- Born: Craig Alan Goldman; October 3, 1968 (age 58) Fort Worth, Texas, U.S.
- Party: Republican
- Spouse: Auryn Bachman (until 2020s)
- Education: University of Texas, Austin (BA)
- Website: House website Campaign website

Craig Alan Goldman (born October 3, 1968) is an American politician who is serving as the U.S. representative for Texas's 12th congressional district since 2025. A member of the Republican Party, he previously represented the 97th district in the Texas House of Representatives from 2013 to 2025.

== Life and career ==
Goldman was born in Fort Worth, Texas. He earned his Bachelor of Arts degree in political science and government from the University of Texas at Austin. He worked as a real estate businessman in his hometown. He is Jewish and was a member of Zeta Beta Tau.

In 2012, Goldman was elected to the Texas House of Representatives, succeeding Mark M. Shelton in the 97th district with 59.4% of the vote. He assumed office on January 8, 2013 and served until January 3, 2025.

In 2024, Goldman ran for election in the U.S. House of Representatives. He sought to represent Texas's 12th congressional district, from which longtime representative Kay Granger was retiring. Goldman defeated John O'Shea in the Republican primary, and subsequently won the general election with 63.5% of the vote.

== U.S. House of Representatives ==
=== Tenure ===
Goldman was sworn in to the 119th United States Congress on January 3, 2025.

=== Committee assignments ===
- Committee on Energy and Commerce
  - Subcommittee on Communications and Technology
  - Subcommittee on Energy
  - Subcommittee on Commerce, Manufacturing, and Trade

== Electoral history ==
2012

Texas General Election, 2012: State Representative District 97
Party	Candidate	Votes	%
Republican	Craig Goldman	38,139	59.4
Democratic	Gary Grassia	24,159	37.6
Libertarian	Rod Wingo	1,105	9.5

2014

Texas General Election, 2014: State Representative District 97
Party	Candidate	Votes	%
Republican	Craig Goldman	27,977	81.6
Libertarian	Rod Wingo	6,295	18.4

2016

Texas General Election, 2016: State Representative District 97
Party	Candidate	Votes	%
Republican	Craig Goldman	39,537	57.23
Democratic	Elizabeth Tarrant	27,019	39.11
Libertarian	Patrick Wentworth	2,531	3.66

2018

Texas General Election, 2018: State Representative District 97
Party	Candidate	Votes	%
Republican	Craig Goldman	35,171	53.2
Democratic	Beth Llewellyn McLaughlin	29,665	44.9
Libertarian	Rod Wingo	1,289	1.9

2020

Texas General Election, 2020: State Representative District 97
Party	Candidate	Votes	%
Republican	Craig Goldman	43,852	52.6
Democratic	Elizabeth Beck	37,707	45.2
Libertarian	Rod Wingo	1,884	2.3

2022

Texas General Election, 2022: State Representative District 97
Party	Candidate	Votes	%
Republican	Craig Goldman	37,439	58.2
Democratic	Laurel McLaurin	26,890	41.8

2024

Texas General Election, 2024: Texas's 12th congressional district
Party	Candidate	Votes	%
Republican	Craig Goldman	174,421	64.1
Democratic	Trey Hunt	97,851	35.9

== See also ==
- List of Jewish members of the United States Congress
- List of new members of the 119th United States Congress

Texas House of Representatives
Preceded by Jim Murphy	Majority Leader of the Texas House of Representatives; 2023–2024	Succeeded by Tom Oliverson
U.S. House of Representatives
Preceded by Kay Granger	Member of the U.S. House of Representatives from Texas's 12th congressional district 2025–present	Incumbent
U.S. order of precedence (ceremonial)
Preceded by Laura Gillen	United States representatives by seniority 383rd	Succeeded by Maggie Goodlander
