= Methodist Hospital (San Antonio) =

- Methodist Healthcare

Geography
- Location: 7700 Floyd Curl Drive, San Antonio, Texas, United States

Organization
- Care system: Non-profit
- Type: Short Term Acute Care

Services
- Emergency department: Level III trauma center
- Beds: 1,536

History
- Opened: 1963

Links
- Website: sahealth.com/locations/methodist-hospital/
- Lists: Hospitals in Texas

Methodist Hospital is a hospital operated by Methodist Healthcare located in San Antonio, Texas. Methodist Hospital was established in 1963 and is one of the largest hospitals in the United States in terms of number of available beds. The hospital offers San Antonio's only heart transplant program.

== History ==
The hospital was chartered in 1955 and was the first hospital to open in the South Texas Medical Center. The hospital focuses on cardiology, oncology, emergency medicine, bone and marrow stem cell transplant, neurosciences, women's health and orthopedics. The hospital has a certified Comprehensive Stroke Center.

The hospital is known for its neurology and neurosurgical care and has performed more back and neck surgeries than any other hospitals in Texas. In 2013, a memorandum of understanding was signed between the University of Texas Health Science Center's pediatrics program and Methodist Hospital. Negotiations were unable to close and the deal collapsed at the end of spring in 2014.
