= Mark M. Shelton =

American politician (born 1956)

Mark Shelton

Member of the Texas House of Representatives from the 97th district
- In office January 13, 2009 – January 8, 2013
- Preceded by: Dan Barrett
- Succeeded by: Craig Goldman

Personal details
- Born: November 8, 1956 (age 69)
- Party: Republican
- Spouse: Mary Ann Shelton
- Children: 4
- Education: Baylor University; Texas A&M Health Science Center College of Medicine
- Occupation: Pediatrician

Mark McGregor Shelton (born November 8, 1956) is an American physician working as a pediatrician at the Cook Children's Medical Center in Fort Worth, Texas. He previously served as a Republican member of the Texas House of Representatives. From 2009 to 2013, he represented House District 97 in Tarrant County. He is a graduate of Arlington's Lamar High School, and received a BS from Baylor University. Shelton completed his medical studies at the Texas A&M University College of Medicine.

== Background ==
Shelton grew up in Arlington, Texas. Part of a family of Scouters, he earned the rank of Eagle Scout.

Shelton has served as the director of the Pediatric Infectious Diseases Program at the Cook Children's Medical Center in Fort Worth, Texas, since 1988.

He has been involved in the community. He has served as a volunteer with the Longhorn Council of the Boy Scouts, the Ronald McDonald House of Fort Worth, and board member of the Lena Pope Home.

Political offices
Texas House of Representatives
Preceded by Anna Mowery	Texas State Representative from District 97 (Fort Worth); 2009–2013	Succeeded by Craig Goldman
