= Baptist Medical Center =

Hospital, part of the Baptist Health System in San Antonio, Texas

Coordinates: 29.4331°N 98.4923°W

- Baptist Health System

Geography
- Location: 111 Dallas St, San Antonio, Texas, United States

Organization
- Care system: Non-profit
- Type: Short Term Acute Care

Services
- Emergency department: Level IV trauma center
- Beds: 623

History
- Opened: 1903

Links
- Website: www.baptisthealthsystem.com/location/detail/baptist-medical-center
- Lists: Hospitals in Texas

Baptist Medical Center is a district general hospital and a part of the Baptist Health System in San Antonio, Texas. The hospital offers San Antonio's only heart transplant program.

The hospital is rated with 3 out of 5 stars according to the 5-star overall rating system developed by the Centers for Medicare & Medicaid Services; it is reported that 620 medical professionals are affiliated with the hospital.

== History ==
The hospital was founded in 1903 and is one of the oldest hospitals in San Antonio. The hospital is a provider of cardiovascular, orthopedic, and endocrine care. U.S. News & World Report ranked Baptist Medical Center as 22nd best hospital in Texas and second best in San Antonio.

Baptist Medical Center has the busiest emergency room in San Antonio with over 3,600 patients per month. In 2018, the hospital spent more than $8.5 million to renovated the first floor including the emergency room.

Doctors at Baptist Medical Center warned shoppers of the health hazard of holiday shopping, stating it "can lead to hypertension, stroke, cardiovascular disease, and even ulcers".
