= List of hospitals in Texas =

This is a List of hospitals in Texas (U.S. state), sorted alphabetically.

Hospital name	City	County	Acute care beds	Trauma level	Affiliation	Notes
AdventHealth Central Texas	Killeen	Bell	208	IV	AdventHealth	Formerly Metroplex Adventist Hospital
AdventHealth Rollins Brook	Lampasas	Lampasas	25	IV	AdventHealth	Formerly Rollins Brooks Community Hospital
Ascension Providence	Waco	McLennan	271	IV	Ascension	
Ascension Seton Hays	Kyle		165	II	Ascension	
Ascension Seton Highland Lakes	Burnet		25	IV	Ascension	
Ascension Seton Medical Center Austin	Austin	Travis	391	IV	Ascension	
Ascension Seton Williamson	Round Rock	Williamson	143	II	Ascension	
Aspire Behavioral Health Hospital	Conroe		30			
Audie L. Murphy Memorial VA Hospital	San Antonio	Bexar			VA	
Ballinger Memorial Hospital District	Ballinger			IV		
Baptist Hospitals of Southeast Texas	Beaumont		378	IV		
Baptist Medical Center	San Antonio	Bexar	1,573	IV		
Baptist Saint Anthony's Hospital	Amarillo		389	IV		
Baylor Scott & White All Saints Medical Center Fort Worth	Fort Worth	Tarrant	398	III	Baylor Scott & White	
Baylor Scott & White Heart and Vascular Hospital – Dallas	Dallas	Dallas	53		Baylor Scott & White	
Baylor Scott and White the Heart Hospital – Denton	Denton	Denton	22		Baylor Scott & White	
Baylor Scott and White the Heart Hospital – Plano	Plano	Collin	109		Baylor Scott & White	
Baylor Scott & White McLane Children's Medical Center	Temple		-	II	Baylor Scott & White	
Baylor Scott & White Medical Center – Brenham	Brenham		60	IV	Baylor Scott & White	
Baylor Scott & White Medical Center – Buda	Buda		15		Baylor Scott & White	
Baylor Scott & White Medical Center – Centennial	Frisco	Collin	118	III	Baylor Scott & White	
Baylor Scott & White Medical Center – College Station	College Station		135		Baylor Scott & White	
Baylor Scott and White Medical Center – Frisco	Frisco	Collin	68		Baylor Scott & White	
Baylor Scott & White Medical Center – Grapevine	Grapevine	Tarrant	302	II	Baylor Scott & White	
Baylor Scott & White Medical Center – Hillcrest	Waco	McLennan	210	II	Baylor Scott & White	
Baylor Scott & White Medical Center – Irving	Irving	Dallas	222		Baylor Scott & White	
Baylor Scott & White Medical Center – Lake Pointe	Rowlett	Dallas	176	III	Baylor Scott & White	
Baylor Scott & White Medical Center – Lakeway	Lakeway	Travis	106	IV	Baylor Scott & White	
Baylor Scott & White Medical Center – Marble Falls	Marble Falls		46	IV	Baylor Scott & White	
Baylor Scott & White Medical Center – McKinney	McKinney	Collin	143	III	Baylor Scott & White	
Baylor Scott & White Medical Center – Pflugerville	Pflugerville	Travis	25		Baylor Scott & White	
Baylor Scott & White Medical Center – Plano	Plano	Collin	160		Baylor Scott & White	
Baylor Scott & White Medical Center – Round Rock	Round Rock	Williamson	190	IV	Baylor Scott & White	
Baylor Scott & White Medical Center – Sunnyvale	Sunnyvale		70		Baylor Scott & White	
Baylor Scott & White Medical Center – Taylor	Taylor	Williamson	25	IV	Baylor Scott & White	
Baylor Scott & White Medical Center – Temple	Temple	Bell	634	I	Baylor Scott & White	
Baylor Scott & White Medical Center – Trophy Club	Trophy Club	Denton	22		Baylor Scott & White	
Baylor Scott & White Medical Center – Uptown	Dallas		24		Baylor Scott & White	
Baylor Scott & White Medical Center – Waxahachie	Waxahachie		112	IV	Baylor Scott & White	
Baylor University Medical Center	Dallas	Dallas	844	I	Baylor Scott & White	
Bellville Medical Center	Bellville		10	IV		
Big Bend Regional Medical Center	Alpine		25	IV		
Brooke Army Medical Center	Fort Sam Houston			I	US ARMY	
Brownfield Regional Medical Center	Brownfield		26	IV		
Carl R. Darnall Army Medical Center	Fort Hood			III		
Carrollton Regional Medical Center	Carrollton		89			
Cedar Park Regional Medical Center	Cedar Park		100	IV		
Central Texas Veterans Health Care System – Olin E. Teague Veterans' Center	Temple				VA	
CHI St. Joseph Health Regional Hospital – Bryan, TX	Bryan		217	III		
CHI St. Luke's Health – Brazosport Hospital	Lake Jackson		94	III		
CHI St. Luke's Health – Lakeside Hospital	The Woodlands		30			
CHI St. Luke's Health – Patients Medical Center	South Pasadena		61			
CHI St. Luke's Health – Sugar Land Hospital	Sugar Land		100			
CHI St. Luke's Health – The Vintage Hospital	Houston		94			
Children's Hospital of San Antonio	San Antonio	Bexar	174	III		
Children's Medical Center Dallas	Dallas	Dallas	386	I		
Children's Medical Center Plano	Plano	Collin	72	IV		
Childress Regional Medical Center	Childress		37	IV		
Christus Good Shepherd Medical Center – Longview	Longview		351	III	Christus	
Christus Good Shepherd Medical Center – Marshall	Marshall		327	IV	Christus	
Christus Mother Frances Hospital – Sulphur Springs	Sulphur Springs		62	IV	Christus	
Christus Mother Frances Hospital – Tyler	Tyler		457	II	Christus	
Christus Saint Michael Hospital	Texarkana		275	III	Christus	
Christus Saint Michael Hospital – Atlanta	Atlanta		37	IV	Christus	
Christus Santa Rosa Hospital – Medical Center	San Antonio	Bexar	367	IV	Christus	
Christus Santa Rosa Hospital – San Marcos	San Marcos		115	IV	Christus	
Christus Southeast Texas – Jasper Memorial	Jasper		40		Christus	
Christus Southeast Texas – St. Elizabeth and St. Mary	Beaumont		353	III	Christus	
Christus Spohn Hospital Alice	Alice		72	IV	Christus	
Christus Spohn Hospital Beeville	Beeville		40	IV	Christus	
Christus Spohn Hospital Corpus Christi – Shoreline	Corpus Christi		549	II	Christus	
Christus Spohn Hospital Corpus Christi – South	Corpus Christi			IV	Christus	
Christus Spohn Hospital – Kleberg	Kingsville		50	IV	Christus	
Citizens Medical Center	Victoria		306	III		
Cleveland Emergency Hospital	Cleveland		16			
Columbus Community Hospital	Columbus		40	IV		
Connally Memorial Medical Center	Floresville		44	IV		
Cook Children's Medical Center	Fort Worth	Tarrant	401	II		
Corpus Christi Medical Center Bay Area	Corpus Christi		-	II		
Corpus Christi Medical Center – Doctors Regional	Corpus Christi		421	IV		
Corpus Christi Medical Center Northwest	Corpus Christi		89	IV		
Covenant Children's Hospital	Lubbock		204	II		
Covenant Health Levelland	Levelland		48			
Covenant Health Plainview	Plainview		49	IV		
Covenant Medical Center	Lubbock		380	II		
Crescent Medical Center Lancaster	Lancaster		84			
Cuero Regional Hospital	Cuero		44			
Dallas Medical Center	Dallas		119	IV		
Dallas Regional Medical Center	Mesquite		202	IV		
Del Sol Medical Center	El Paso		314	II		
Dell Children's Medical Center	Austin	Travis	181	I	Ascension	
Dell Seton Medical Center at The University of Texas	Austin	Travis		I	Ascension	
DeTar Healthcare System	Victoria		193	III		
Doctors Hospital at Renaissance	Edinburg		519	I		
Doctors Hospital of Laredo	Laredo		183	III		
Driscoll Children's Hospital	Corpus Christi		191	III		
East Houston Hospital and Clinics	Houston		41			
Eastland Memorial Hospital	Eastland		19			
El Campo Memorial Hospital	El Campo		26	IV		
El Paso Children's Hospital	El Paso		122			
Ennis Regional Medical Center	Ennis		60	IV		
Faith Community Hospital	Jacksboro		13			
Falls Community Hospital and Clinic	Marlin		36			
Fort Duncan Regional Medical Center	Eagle Pass		101	IV		
Foundation Surgical Hospital of El Paso	El Paso		40			
Freestone Medical Center	Fairfield		37	IV		
Gonzales Memorial Hospital	Gonzales		34			
Grace Medical Center	Lubbock		92			
Graham Regional Medical Center	Graham		25			
Guadalupe Regional Medical Center	Seguin		139			
Harlingen Medical Center	Harlingen		112	IV		
Harris Health System Ben Taub Hospital	Houston		654	I		
Harris Health System Lyndon B. Johnson Hospital	Houston			III		
HCA Houston Healthcare Clear Lake	Webster		558	II	HCA	
HCA Houston Healthcare Conroe	Conroe		295	II	HCA	
HCA Houston Healthcare Kingwood	Kingwood		573	III	HCA	
HCA Houston Healthcare Mainland	Texas City		217	IV	HCA	
HCA Houston Healthcare Medical Center	Houston		147		HCA	
HCA Houston Healthcare North Cypress	Cypress		139		HCA	
HCA Houston Healthcare Northwest	Houston		322	II	HCA	
HCA Houston Healthcare Pearland	Pearland		97		HCA	
HCA Houston Healthcare Southeast	Pasadena		278	III	HCA	
HCA Houston Healthcare Tomball	Tomball		241	III	HCA	
HCA Houston Healthcare West	Houston		244		HCA	
Heart Hospital of Austin	Austin		58	IV		
Hemphill County Hospital	Canadian		15	IV		
Hendrick Medical Center	Abilene		410	III		
Hendrick Medical Center Brownwood	Brownwood		65			
Hereford Regional Medical Center	Hereford		32	IV		
Hill Country Memorial Hospital	Fredericksburg		57			
The Hospital at Westlake Medical Center	West Lake Hills		23			
The Hospitals of Providence East Campus	El Paso		218	III		This hospital was scheduled to become a level II trauma hospital on November 15, 2022.
The Hospitals of Providence Horizon City Campus	Horizon City		16			
The Hospitals of Providence Memorial Campus	El Paso		318	III		
The Hospitals of Providence Sierra Campus	El Paso		306	IV		
The Hospitals of Providence Transmountain Campus	El Paso		108	IV		
Houston Methodist Baytown Hospital	Baytown		207			
Houston Methodist Clear Lake Hospital	Nassau Bay		178			
Houston Methodist Cypress Hospital	Cypress					
Houston Methodist Hospital	Houston		1,203			
Houston Methodist Sugar Land Hospital	Sugar Land		337			
Houston Methodist West Hospital	Houston		238			
Houston Methodist Willowbrook Hospital	Houston		346			
Houston Methodist The Woodlands Hospital	The Woodlands		186			
Hunt Regional Medical Center at Greenville	Greenville		177			
Huntsville Memorial Hospital	Huntsville		100	IV		
John Peter Smith Hospital	Fort Worth		566	I		
Kell West Regional Hospital	Wichita Falls		41			
Knapp Medical Center	Weslaco		186	III		
Lake Granbury Medical Center	Granbury		53	IV		
Lamb Healthcare Center	Littlefield		42	IV		
Laredo Medical Center	Laredo		314	III		
Las Palmas Medical Center	El Paso		596	III		
Legent Orthopedic Hospital	Carrollton		18			
Longview Regional Medical Center	Longview		224	III		
Lubbock Heart & Surgical Hospital	Lubbock		73			
Matagorda Regional Medical Center	Bay City		58	IV		
Mayhill Hospital	Denton		59			
Medical Arts Hospital	Lamesa		22	IV		
Medical Center Hospital	Odessa		337	III		
The Medical Center of Southeast Texas	Port Arthur		216	IV		
Medical City Alliance	Fort Worth	Tarrant	75	III	HCA	
Medical City Arlington	Arlington	Tarrant	356	II	HCA	
Medical City Dallas	Dallas	Dallas	836	IV	HCA	
Medical City Denton	Denton	Denton	195	II	HCA	
Medical City Fort Worth	Fort Worth	Tarrant	227		HCA	
Medical City Frisco	Frisco	Collin		III	HCA	A campus of Medical City Plano
Medical City Las Colinas	Irving	Dallas	84	III	HCA	
Medical City Lewisville	Lewisville		186	III	HCA	
Medical City McKinney	McKinney		252	III	HCA	
Medical City North Hills	North Richland Hills		157	III	HCA	
Medical City Plano	Plano	Collin	577	I	HCA	
Medical City Weatherford	Weatherford		82	IV	HCA	
Memorial Hermann Cypress Hospital	Cypress			III		
Memorial Hermann Greater Heights Hospital	Houston			III		
Memorial Hermann Katy Hospital	Katy		208	III		
Memorial Hermann Memorial City Medical Center	Houston		444	IV		
Memorial Hermann Northeast Hospital	Humble		242			
Memorial Hermann Orthopedic & Spine Hospital	Bellaire		64			
Memorial Hermann Pearland Hospital	Pearland			IV		
Memorial Hermann Southeast Hospital	Houston			III		
Memorial Hermann Southwest Hospital	Houston		543	IV		
Memorial Hermann Sugar Land Hospital	Sugar Land		205	IV		
Memorial Hermann Surgical Hospital Kingwood	Kingwood		10			
Memorial Hermann–Texas Medical Center	Houston		1,087	I		
Memorial Hermann The Woodlands Medical Center	The Woodlands			II		
Methodist Charlton Medical Center	Dallas	Dallas	277	II		
Methodist Children's Hospital	San Antonio		198			
Methodist Dallas Medical Center	Dallas	Dallas	378			
Methodist Hospital	San Antonio		1,764	III		
Methodist Hospital Atascosa	Jourdanton		67			
Methodist Hospital Northeast	Live Oak		116			
Methodist Mansfield Medical Center	Mansfield		262	III		
Methodist McKinney Hospital	McKinney		23			
Methodist Midlothian Medical Center	Midlothian		46			
Methodist Richardson Medical Center	Richardson	Collin	298			
Methodist Southlake Hospital	Southlake	Tarrant	54			
Methodist Specialty and Transplant Hospital	San Antonio		217	IV		
Methodist Stone Oak Hospital	San Antonio		295	III		
Methodist TexSan Hospital	San Antonio		120	IV		
Metropolitan Methodist Hospital	San Antonio		279	IV		
Michael E. DeBakey Department of Veterans Affairs Medical Center	Houston					
MidCoast Medical Center – Central	Llano			IV		
Midland Memorial Hospital	Midland		225	III		
Mission Regional Medical Center	Mission		297	IV		
Mission Trail Baptist Hospital	San Antonio			IV		
Nacogdoches Medical Center	Nacogdoches		155	IV		
Nacogdoches Memorial Hospital	Nacogdoches		141			
Navarro Regional Hospital	Corsicana		49	IV		
Nexus Children's Hospital Houston	Houston		40			
Nocona General Hospital	Nocona		18	IV		
North Central Baptist Hospital	San Antonio			III		
North Central Surgical Center Hospital	Dallas	Dallas	24			
North Texas Medical Center	Gainesville		35			
North Texas State Hospital – Wichita Falls Campus	Wichita Falls		575			
Northeast Baptist Hospital	San Antonio			IV		
Northwest Texas Healthcare System	Amarillo		444	III		
OakBend Medical Center	Richmond		218	IV		
Odessa Regional Medical Center	Odessa		222	IV		
Palestine Regional Medical Center	Palestine		156	IV		
Palo Pinto General Hospital	Mineral Wells		48			
Pampa Regional Medical Center	Pampa		110	IV		
Paris Regional Medical Center	Paris		253	III		
Parkland Memorial Hospital	Dallas	Dallas	850	I		
Parkview Regional Hospital	Mexia		49	IV		
Permian Regional Medical Center	Andrews		31			
Peterson Regional Medical Center	Kerrville		110	IV		
Quail Creek Surgical Hospital	Amarillo		40			
Resolute Health Hospital	New Braunfels		112	IV		
Rio Grande Regional Hospital	McAllen		320	III		
Rolling Plains Memorial Hospital	Sweetwater		39	IV		
Saint Camillus Medical Center	Hurst		23			
St. David's Georgetown Hospital	Georgetown		96	IV	HCA	
St. David's Medical Center	Austin		607	IV	HCA	
St. David's North Austin Medical Center	Austin		441	IV	HCA	
Saint David's Round Rock Medical Center	Round Rock		157	II		
St. David's South Austin Medical Center	Austin		368		HCA	
St. Joseph Health College Station Hospital	College Station		114			
St. Joseph Medical Center	Houston		284	II		
St. Luke's Baptist Hospital	San Antonio			IV		
St. Luke's Health – Baylor St. Luke's Medical Center	Houston		658			
St. Luke's Health – Memorial Livingston Hospital	Livingston		52			
St. Luke's Health – Memorial Lufkin	Lufkin		178			
St. Luke's Health – The Woodlands Hospital	The Woodlands		238			
Saint Mark's Medical Center	La Grange		38			
Scenic Mountain Medical Center	Big Spring		95			
Seton Medical Center Harker Heights	Harker Heights	Bell	65	IV	Ascension	
Seymour Hospital	Seymour		27	IV		
Shannon Medical Center	San Angelo		445			
Shannon Medical Center South	San Angelo		131	IV		
South Texas Health System Children's Hospital	Edinburg		86			
South Texas Health System Edinburg	Edinburg		838	IV	UHS	
South Texas Health System Heart	McAllen		60	IV	UHS	
South Texas Health System McAllen	McAllen		542	I	UHS	
South Texas Spine & Surgical Hospital	San Antonio		30			
Starr County Memorial Hospital	Rio Grande City		48	IV		
Stephens Memorial Hospital	Breckenridge		14	IV		
Surgery Specialty Hospitals of America	Pasadena		37			
Texas Children's Hospital	Houston		861	I		
Texas Children's Hospital The Woodlands	The Woodlands			IV		
Texas Health Allen	Allen	Collin	47			
Texas Health Arlington Memorial Hospital	Arlington	Tarrant	209	IV		
Texas Health Denton	Denton	Denton	196			
Texas Health Frisco	Frisco	Collin	60			
Texas Health Harris Medical Hospital Alliance	Fort Worth	Tarrant	123	III		
Texas Health Harris Methodist Hospital Azle	Azle		31	IV		
Texas Health Harris Methodist Hospital Cleburne	Cleburne		75			
Texas Health Harris Methodist Hospital Fort Worth	Fort Worth	Tarrant	653	II		
Texas Health Harris Methodist Hospital – Hurst – Euless – Bedford	Bedford	Tarrant	251	III		
Texas Health Harris Methodist Hospital Southlake	Southlake	Tarrant	17			
Texas Health Harris Methodist Hospital Stephenville	Stephenville		36	IV		
Texas Health Heart & Vascular Hospital Arlington	Arlington	Tarrant	47			
Texas Health Hospital Mansfield	Mansfield	Tarrant		IV		Joint venture between AdventHealth and Texas Health Resources
Texas Health Huguley Hospital Fort Worth South	Burleson		213	IV		Joint venture between AdventHealth and Texas Health Resources
Texas Health Kaufman	Kaufman	Kaufman	46			
Texas Health Presbyterian Dallas	Dallas	Dallas	628	I		
Texas Health Presbyterian Hospital Flower Mound	Flower Mound	Dallas	99			
Texas Health Presbyterian Hospital of Rockwall	Rockwall	Rockwall	53			
Texas Health Presbyterian Hospital Plano	Plano	Collin	369	II		
Texas Health Southwest Fort Worth	Fort Worth	Tarrant	245			
Texas Orthopedic Hospital	Houston		49			
Texas Scottish Rite Hospital for Children	Dallas	Dallas				
Texas Vista Medical Center	San Antonio	Bexar	225	IV		
Texoma Medical Center	Denison		376	III		
Titus Regional Medical Center	Mount Pleasant		70	III		
Tyler County Hospital	Woodville		25	IV		
United Memorial Medical Center	Houston		151			
United Regional Healthcare System	Wichita Falls		248	II		
University Hospital	San Antonio	Bexar	650	I		
University Medical Center	Lubbock		479	I		
University Medical Center of El Paso	El Paso		290	I		
The University of Texas M.D. Anderson Cancer Center	Houston		739			
The University of Texas Medical Branch Angleton Danbury Hospital	Angleton		62	IV		
The University of Texas Medical Branch Health Clear Lake Campus	Webster		149	III		
The University of Texas Medical Branch Health Galveston Campus	Galveston		804	I		
The University of Texas Medical Branch Health League City Campus	League City			III		
USMD Hospital at Arlington	Arlington	Tarrant	34			
UT Health East Texas Athens Hospital	Athens		127	IV		
UT Health East Texas Carthage Hospital	Carthage		42	IV		
UT Health East Texas Jacksonville Hospital	Jacksonville		35	IV		
UT Health Henderson	Henderson		41			
UT Health North Campus Tyler	Tyler		130	IV		
UT Health Tyler	Tyler		382	I		
UT Southwestern William P. Clements Jr. University Hospital	Dallas	Dallas	700			
Uvalde Memorial Hospital	Uvalde		21	IV		
Val Verde Regional Medical Center	Del Rio		47	IV		
Valley Baptist Medical Center – Brownsville	Brownsville	Cameron	240	III		
Valley Baptist Medical Center – Harlingen	Harlingen		407	II		
Valley Regional Medical Center	Brownsville	Cameron	187	III		
Wadley Regional Medical Center	Texarkana		199	III		
White Rock Medical Center	Dallas	Dallas	187			
Wilbarger General Hospital	Vernon		28	IV		
Wilson N. Jones Regional Medical Center	Sherman		221	III		
Wise Health Surgical Hospital at Parkway	Fort Worth	Tarrant	36			
Wise Health System East Campus	Decatur		116	IV		
Woman's Hospital of Texas	Houston		256	IV		
Woodland Heights Medical Center	Lufkin		145	IV		
