= Del Sol Medical Center =

- Las Palmas Del Sol Healthcare

Geography
- Location: 10301 Gateway Blvd W., El Paso, Texas, United States
- Coordinates: 31.75693°N 106.35015°W

Organization
- Type: Private

Services
- Standards: Tertiary care
- Emergency department: Level II Trauma Center
- Beds: 350

History
- Founded: 1974

Links
- Website: laspalmasdelsolhealthcare.com
- Lists: Hospitals in Texas

Del Sol Medical Center (Del Sol) is a tertiary care hospital located in El Paso, Texas and is owned and operated by HCA Healthcare. The hospital was founded in 1974 and is licensed as a Level II trauma center. The hospital has 350 beds and is located in the Eastside area of the city.

Del Sol is affiliated with Las Palmas Medical Center and is part of the Las Palmas Del Sol Healthcare System.

The medical center offers cardiovascular, emergency, neuroscience, oncology, orthopedic, rehabilitation, surgery, intensive care, wound care, laboratory, and radiologic/imaging services.
