= Baylor Scott & White Medical Center – Temple =

- Baylor Scott & White Health
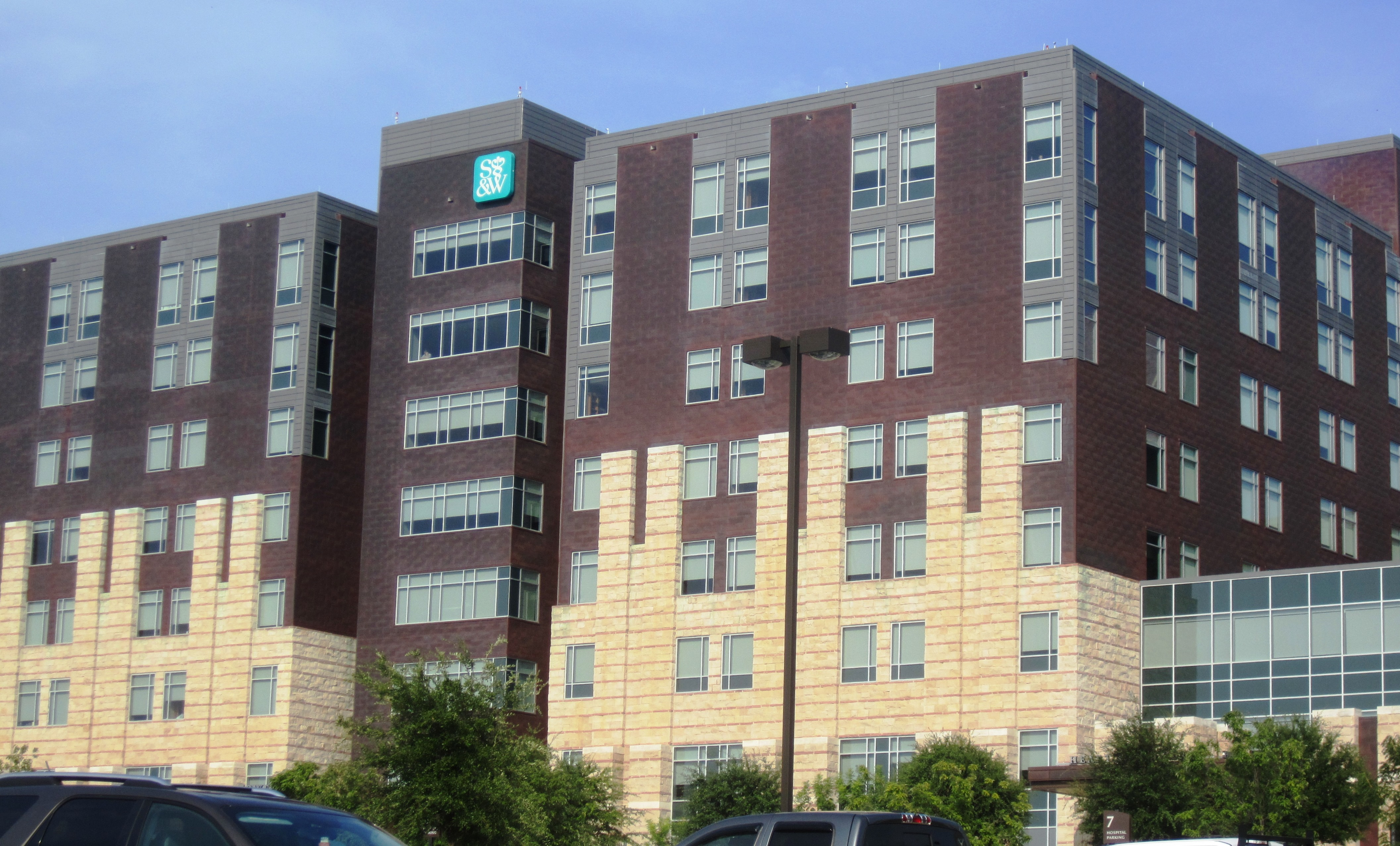

Geography
- Location: 2401 S. 31st Street., Temple, Texas, Bell County, Texas, United States
- Coordinates: 31.07753°N 97.36383°W

Organization
- Care system: Private, Medicaid, Medicare
- Type: Teaching
- Affiliated university: Baylor College of Medicine

Services
- Emergency department: Level I Adult Trauma Center / Level II Pediatric Trauma Center
- Beds: 636
- Speciality: Multi-specialty

History
- Founded: 1897

Links
- Website: www.bswhealth.com/locations/hospital/temple
- Lists: Hospitals in Texas

Baylor Scott & White Medical Center – Temple is a 636-bed multi-specialty teaching hospital located in Temple, Texas. The facility was founded in 1897, when Dr. Arthur C. Scott and Dr. Raleigh R. White Jr. opened the Temple Sanitarium in Temple, Texas. The group practice consists of over 800 physicians and scientists. The primary clinical teaching campus of Baylor College of Medicine's Temple campus, Baylor Scott & White – Temple is ranked as one of the top 100 hospitals and one of the top 15 teaching hospitals in the United States by Thomson Reuters. Baylor Scott & White – Temple has 31 accredited residency and fellowship programs, including programs in emergency medicine, radiology and offers a well-established and respected chaplain resident program.

In 2013, Scott & White merged with Baylor Health Care System to form Baylor Scott & White Health. In October 2018, Baylor Scott & White Health and Memorial Hermann announced their plan to merge, which the plan fell through in 2019.

== Temple Sanitarium ==
Scott and White opened the Temple Sanitarium in 1904 to build upon a growing private practice that served railroad employees passing through Temple. That year they purchased St. Mary's Catholic Convent and converted it for use as a full-time hospital. Corporately chartered in 1905 "for the study, prevention, relief, remedy and care of any and all human disorders and diseases", the sanitarium would eventually consist of 31 buildings scattered on five city blocks. The first female anesthesiologist to work in Texas and in the United States was Dr. Claudia Potter, hired on June 23, 1906.

On March 2, 1917, Dr. White died of a heart attack. Dr. Scott petitioned to change the name to the "Raleigh White" Memorial Hospital, in honor of his late partner, but instead it was changed to "Scott & White" Memorial Hospital on October 13, 1922.

== Organization ==
Following the death of Dr. White, the partnership was changed to Dr. Scott Sr. his brother-in-law, Dr. Marcel W. Sherwood, and Dr. George V. Brindley Sr., in 1917. Dr. Scott's son, Dr. Arthur C. Scott Jr., took over the presidency when his father died of a heart attack on October 27, 1940. On December 23, 1949, for-profit Scott & White Clinic was separated from non-profit Scott & White Memorial Hospital. On August 15, 1950, the name was changed to Scott & White Memorial Hospital and Scott, Sherwood and Brindley Foundation. On November 6, 2016, Baylor Scott & White announced that Scott & White Memorial Hospital would be renamed Scott & White Medical Center as part of the organization's overall rebranding due to the merger of Baylor Health and Scott & White.

== Baylor Scott & White Clinics ==
Baylor Scott & White operates more than 60 primary, specialty and urgent care clinics at locations throughout Central Texas.

Each clinic is served by primary care physicians and many have appointments available with specialists. On-site diagnostic and other capabilities are available to care for the residents of the area.

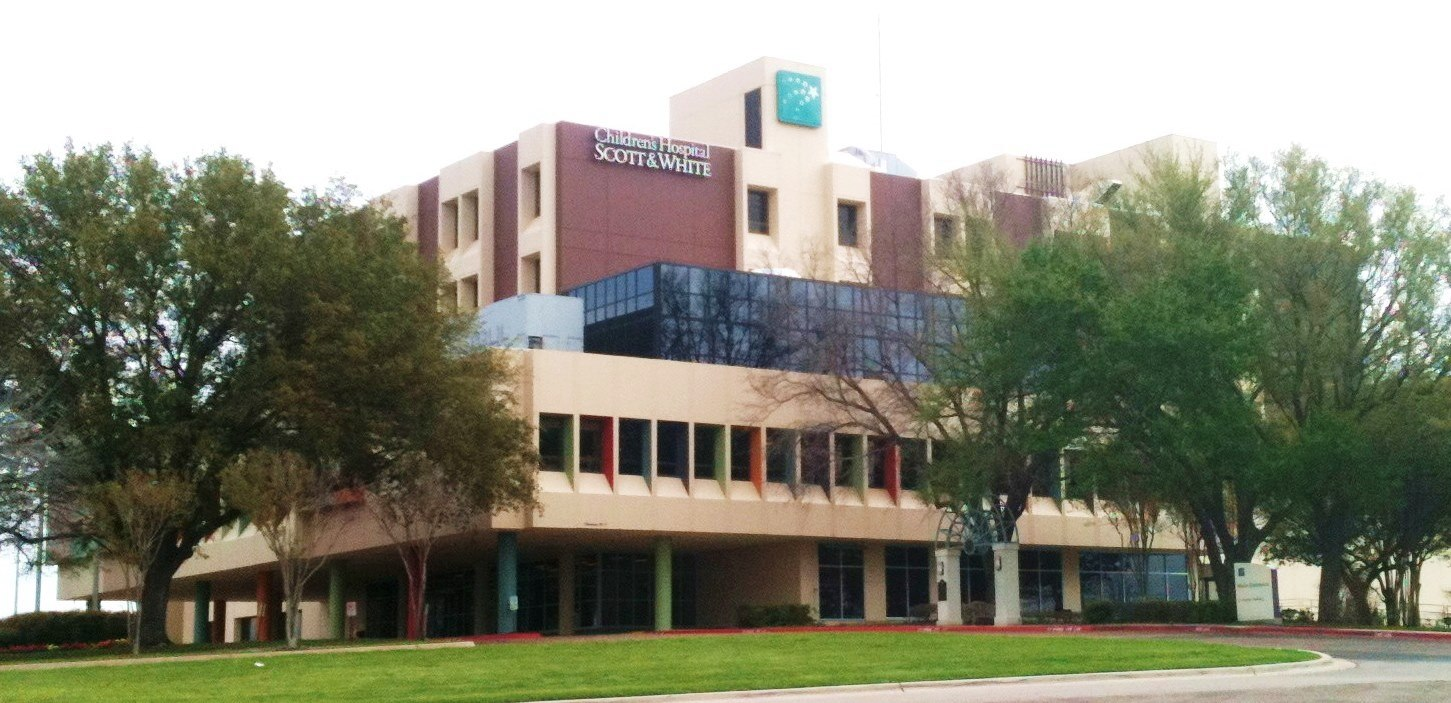
Baylor Scott & White McLane Children's Medical Center

== Education and research ==
Baylor Scott & White has been involved in training of medical, nursing, and allied health professionals since its inception. It formerly served as the main teaching hospital of Texas A&M Health Science Center until a new partnership was established with Baylor College of Medicine, which inaugurated its first class of medical students at their Temple campus in 2023. The hospital also serves as the primary rotation site for University of Mary Hardin-Baylor, Temple College, and surrounding colleges. The hospital also supports a number of post-graduate residency and fellowship programs in medicine, surgery, and pharmacy.

Residency programs offered:

- Anesthesiology
- Dermatology
- Diagnostic Radiology
- Emergency Medicine
- Family Medicine
- General Surgery
- Internal Medicine
- Neurology
- Neurosurgery
- Obstetrics/Gynecology
- Ophthalmology
- Orthopedic Surgery
- Otolaryngology
- Pathology
- Pediatrics
- Plastic Surgery
- Podiatric Surgery
- Psychiatry
- Radiation Oncology (started 2012)
- Urology
- Vascular Surgery Fellowship

== See also ==
- List of hospitals in Texas
