= Medical City Plano =

- Hospital Corporation of America

Geography
- Location: Plano, Texas, United States
- Coordinates: 33.02118°N 96.76696°W

Organization
- Funding: For-profit hospital

Services
- Emergency department: Level I trauma center
- Beds: 603

Helipads
- Helipad: FAA LID: 6TS9

History
- Opened: 1975

Links
- Website: medicalcityhealthcare.com/locations/medical-city-plano/
- Lists: Hospitals in Texas

Medical City Plano is a for-profit, 603-bed hospital in Plano, Texas owned and operated by HCA Healthcare.

== History ==
The hospital was originally opened in 1975. In 2017, the hospital was designated as a Level I trauma center. The hospital completed a $107 million, 138,000-square-foot expansion in October 2019, adding a new burn center, trauma center, oncology center, operating rooms, and 90 patient beds.

== Services ==
Medical City Plano is a Level I trauma center, a comprehensive stroke center, and a comprehensive burn center. The hospital also features a labor and delivery unit and a Level IV neonatal intensive care unit.
