= Claudia Potter =

American physician

Claudia Potter (1881–1970) was an American anesthesiologist. Born near Denton, Texas and educated at the University of Texas Medical Branch in Galveston, she became the first woman anesthesiologist in the United States. She worked at the Temple Sanitarium, which became the Scott & White Memorial Hospital, where she introduced gas anesthesia to Texas. She would serve as president of the Texas Society of Medical Anesthetists in 1947 and 1948, and she was elected an honorary member both of the Texas Medical Association and of the American Society of Anesthesiologists.
