= Houston Methodist West Hospital =

Coordinates: 29.78750°N 95.69250°W

- Houston Methodist
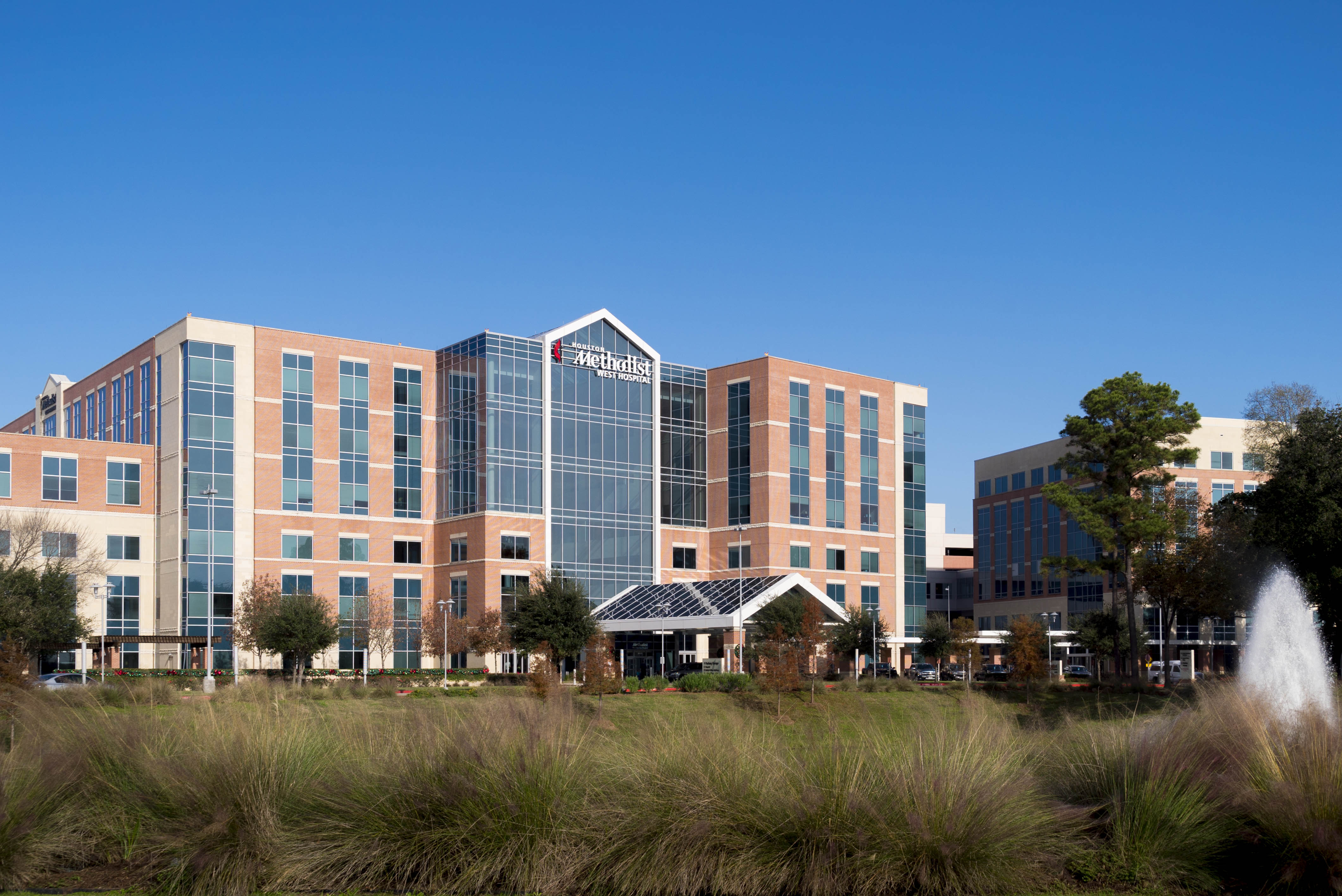

Geography
- Location: 18500 Katy Fwy., Houston, TX 77094, Katy, Texas, United States

Organization
- Care system: Non-profit

Links
- Website: https://www.houstonmethodist.org/locations/katy-west/
- Lists: Hospitals in Texas

Houston Methodist West Hospital, located in west Houston, Texas, is one of seven community hospitals that are part of Houston Methodist. It employs about 1,500 people, has an estimated 800 affiliated doctors and admits roughly 12,000 patients annually. The hospital serves the Katy community.

== History ==
In 2007, Houston Methodist began planning for a hospital that would be constructed outside the Texas Medical Center’s central campus in Houston. The project, branded Texas Medical Center – West, included Methodist West Houston Hospital, which opened in December 2010.

The hospital changed its name to Houston Methodist West Hospital in 2013.

== Accolades ==
In 2018, Houston Methodist West achieved distinction for nursing excellence and quality patient care by the Magnet Recognition Program of the American Nurses Credentialing Center.
