= Houston Methodist Sugar Land Hospital =

Coordinates: 29.58910°N 95.63088°W

- Houston Methodist Hospital
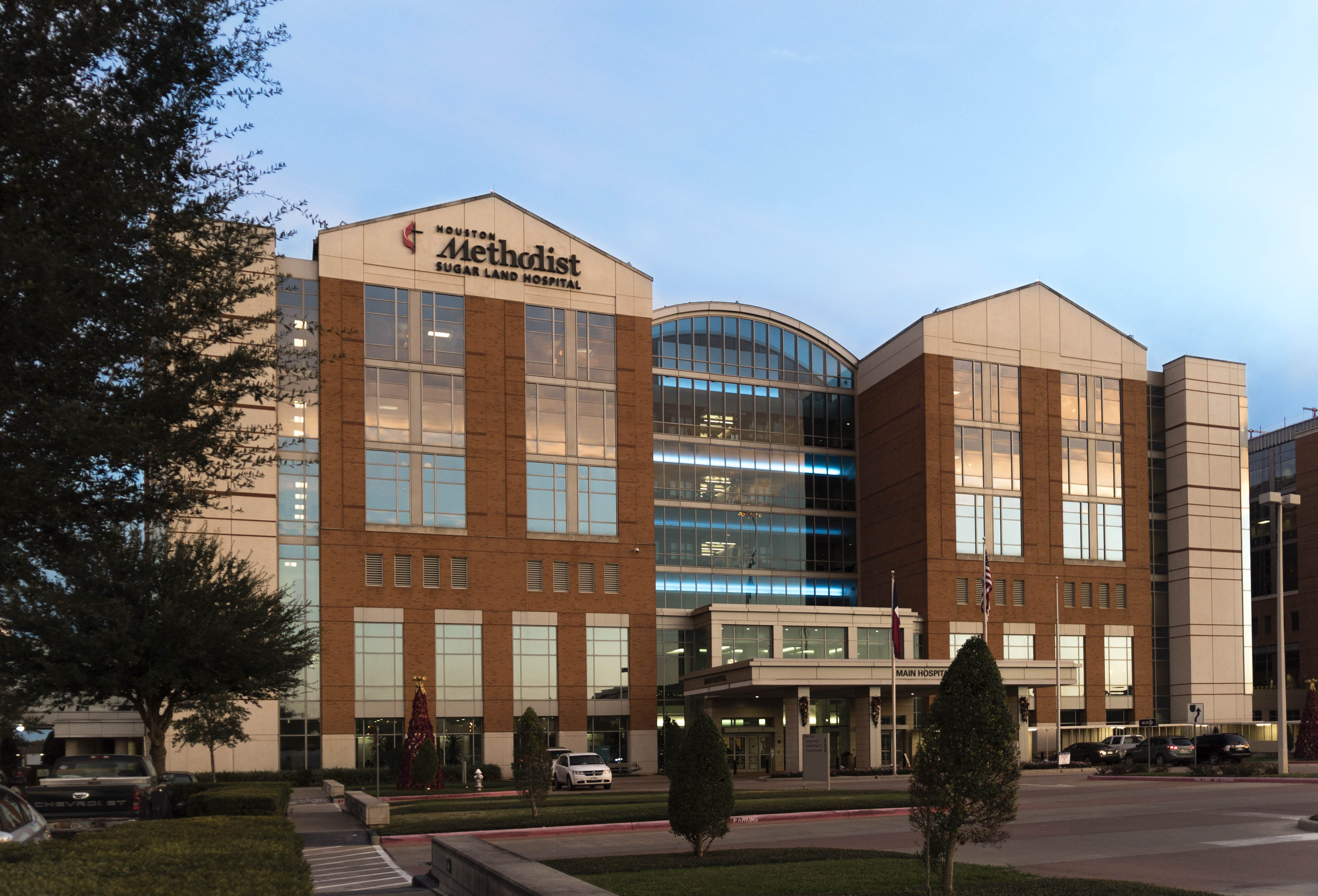

Geography
- Location: 16655 Southwest Frwy., Sugar Land, Texas, United States

Organization
- Care system: Non-profit

Links
- Website: https://www.houstonmethodist.org/locations/sugar-land/
- Lists: Hospitals in Texas

Houston Methodist Sugar Land Hospital, located in Sugar Land, Texas, is one of seven community hospitals that are part of Houston Methodist. It employs more than 2,200 people, has an estimated 1,100 affiliated doctors and admits more than 17,000 patients annually. The hospital serves communities in and around Fort Bend County.

== History ==
In March 1998, Methodist Health Center-Sugar Land opened with 22 beds and 160 employees. It began expanding in size and services in 2008.

The hospital's campus includes 347 medical, surgical and intensive care beds and 27 operating rooms in three patient towers; a stand-alone orthopedics and sports medicine facility and Cancer Center; comprehensive Heart & Vascular Center, Neuroscience & Spine Center and Breast Care Center; an expanding Childbirth Center; three medical office buildings; and primary care physician offices located throughout the community.

Renamed Houston Methodist Sugar Land Hospital in 2013, the hospital is the second-largest private employer in Fort Bend County.

== Accolades ==
In 2017, Houston Methodist Sugar Land received official designation as a Magnet® hospital from the American Nurses Credentialing Center.

In 2018, U.S. News & World Report ranked Houston Methodist Sugar Land Hospital No. 5 in Houston and No. 8 in Texas.
