= Texas's 97th House of Representatives district =

Electoral district of Texas

Texas's 97th State House of Representatives district
Representative
| John McQueeney; R–Fort Worth |

District 97 is a district in the Texas House of Representatives. It has been represented by Republican John McQueeney since 2025.

== Geography ==
The district contains parts of the Tarrant County.

== Members ==
- Dan Barrett (until 2009)
- Mark M. Shelton (2009–2013)
- Craig Goldman (2013–2025)
- John McQueeney (since 2025)
