= Houston Methodist The Woodlands Hospital =

Coordinates: 30.20555°N 95.45339°W

- Houston Methodist
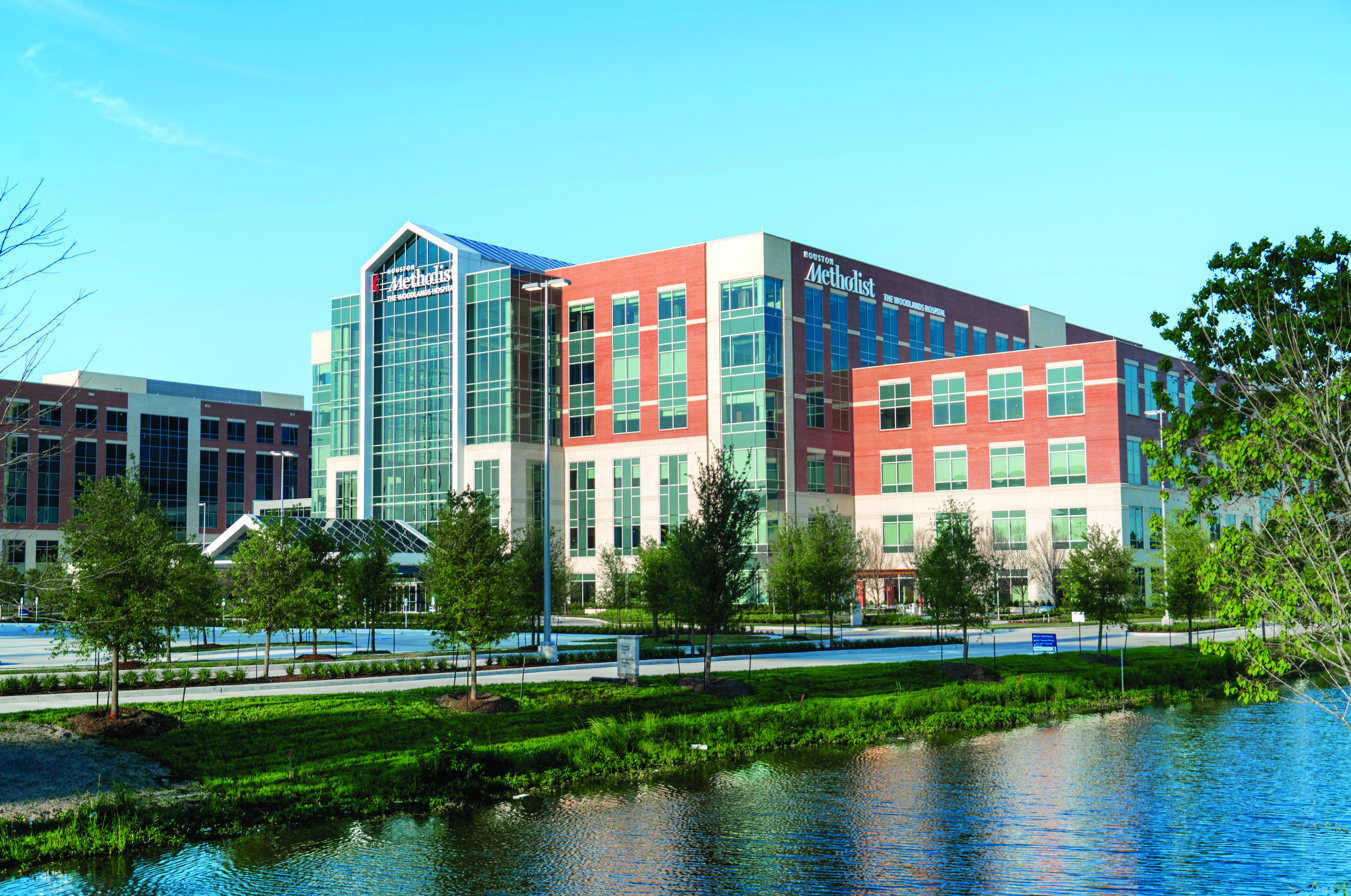

Geography
- Location: 17201 Interstate 45 S., The Woodlands, Texas, United States

Organization
- Care system: Non-profit

Links
- Website: https://www.houstonmethodist.org/locations/the-woodlands/
- Lists: Hospitals in Texas

Houston Methodist The Woodlands Hospital, located in The Woodlands, Texas (north suburban Houston), is one of seven community hospitals that are part of Houston Methodist. As of 2025, it employs more than 2,400 people, has 1,300 affiliated physicians and admits more than 19,500 patients annually. The hospital serves communities in and around The Woodlands.

== History ==
Houston Methodist The Woodlands Hospital, the newest hospital in the Houston Methodist system, opened in 2017. Houston Methodist owned land in The Woodlands for almost a quarter century before construction on The Woodlands campus began in 2014.

Hospital construction came after ExxonMobil Corp. in 2011 began building a campus near The Woodlands to house 10,000 employees
