= Houston Methodist Clear Lake Hospital =

- Houston Methodist
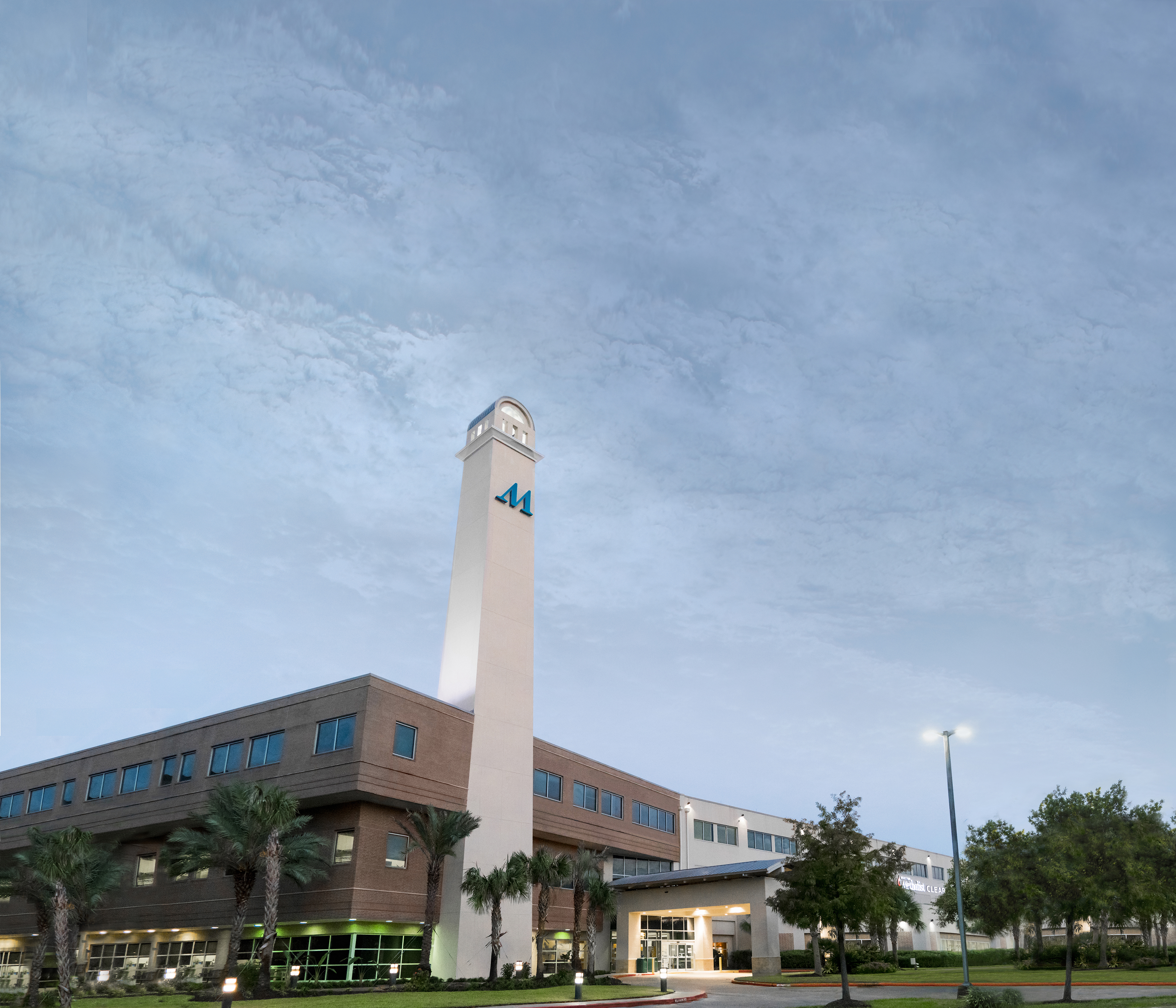

Geography
- Location: 18300 Houston Methodist Drive, Nassau Bay, Clear Lake, Texas, United States
- Coordinates: 29.549606°N 95.086216°W

Organization
- Type: General
- Religious affiliation: Methodist

History
- Former names: Space Center Memorial Hospital, Houston Methodist St. John Hospital
- Opened: 1972

Links
- Website: www.houstonmethodist.org/locations/clearlake
- Lists: Hospitals in Texas

Houston Methodist Clear Lake Hospital, located in Nassau Bay, Texas, across from Johnson Space Center, is one of seven community hospitals that are part of Houston Methodist. It employs about 900 people, has an estimated 700 affiliated doctors and admits more than 5,700 patients annually. The hospital serves the Greater Bay area.

== History ==
In 1972, Space Center Memorial Hospital opened outside Houston to serve about 55,000 people near the NASA Manned Spacecraft Center. The Federal Housing Administration closed the hospital in September 1974 because the facility's mortgage payments were in arrears. The hospital remained unoccupied until the federal government took it over, and it became a U.S. Public Health Service Hospital.

In 1981, the hospital — one of eight nationwide — closed as a result of legislation passed by Congress. The federal government selected the Houston-based Sisters of Charity of the Incarnate Word Health Care Systems to assume control of the hospital. The Sisters purchased the facility for $1.

On December 9, 1981, Christus St. John Hospital treated its first patient. Sister Clare Marie, Sister Frances Therese and Sister Edwin Berry were the hospital's founding sisters. The hospital has provided medication kits for the Space Shuttle and physiological tests for the space program.

The hospital became part of Houston Methodist in 2014, renamed as Houston Methodist St. John Hospital. Another renaming came in 2018 — Houston Methodist Clear Lake Hospital.
