= John McQueeney =

American politician

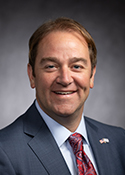

Member of the Texas House of Representatives from the 97th district
- Incumbent
- Assumed office January 14, 2025
- Preceded by: Craig Goldman

Personal details
- Party: Republican
- Website: Campaign website

John McQueeney is an American politician who was elected member of the Texas House of Representatives for the 97th district in 2024. A member of the Republican Party, he succeeded Craig Goldman. McQueeney is a small business owner and entrepreneur from Fort Worth, Texas.

Texas House of Representatives
Preceded by Craig Goldman	Member of the Texas House of Representatives from the 97th district (Fort Worth); 2025–present	Incumbent
