= Doctors Hospital of Laredo =

Hospital in Texas USA, founded 1974

- Universal Health Services Inc.

Geography
- Location: 10700 McPherson Rd, Laredo, Texas, USA
- Coordinates: 27.60691°N 99.47828°W

Organisation
- Care system: Public
- Type: Community

Services
- Beds: 180
- Helipad: Yes

History
- Opened: 1974

Links
- Website: http://www.doctorshosplaredo.com/
- Lists: Hospitals in Texas

Doctors Hospital of Laredo is a for-profit hospital owned and operated by Universal Health Services. There are 164 physicians on the medical staff with the hospital, 80 of whom are active staff. Has a Level III Trauma Center and a Level III NICU, as well as a wide array of medical services. Doctors Hospital of Laredo is located at 10700 McPherson Rd. in Laredo, Texas, United States.

Doctors Hospital operates five satellite clinics around strategic areas of the community. The five locations include Doctors Hospital Health Center (north central), South Laredo Diagnostic Center (south), Providence Health Center (North West), Nueva Vida Maternity Clinic (central heights) and Mines Road Family Clinic (North West). These five centers offer a variety of services accessible and convenient for patients. An additional MRI (Calton MRI) site is available to serve patients in central Laredo and a new freestanding emergency department located in South Laredo is under construction and scheduled to open in spring 2015.

== History ==
Doctors Hospital was founded in 1974 by Dr. Harold "Pat" Yeary, a local dentist, and a group of partners who recruited a group of physicians to come Laredo, Texas and build a state of the art hospital. The original name was Laredo Health Center. The hospital has had seven previous owners: Physician owners, Medenco, Lifemark, AMI, EPIC, Columbia, Triad and UHS became its eighth owner in June 1999. The hospital opened in its new replacement facility on August 18, 2001. Located on the north section of the city, Doctors Hospital is surrounded by growing residential and commercial developments, schools, industrial parks, governmental agencies, and entertainment centers.

== Services ==
- Emergency Department and Fast Track staffed with Emergency Medicine-trained physicians and Registered Nurses certified in ACLS and PALS.
- Accredited Chest Pain Center with PCI
- Accredited Primary Stroke Center
- Therapeutic hypothermia Certified Medical Center
- Women's Center with Level III NICU
- ICU
- Computed Tomography
- MRI
- Nuclear Medicine
- Respiratory Therapy
- Endoscopy
- Cardiology
- Radiology
- Orthopedic surgery
- Bariatric surgery

== Heliport ==
A helipad is available for emergency air ambulance service.

== Awards and accolades ==
- Accredited by American College of Surgeons – Commission on Cancer
- Laredo Morning Times 2013 and 2014 Reader's Choice Award voted Best Hospital
- Laredo Chamber of Commerce 2013 Customer Service Award in the Wellness and Medical category
- Certified by The Joint Commission for Primary Stroke Centers as an Advanced Primary Stroke Center
- Accredited Chest Pain Center
- Accreditation from the American Heart Association and American Stroke Association for success in using "Get with the Guidelines" program to improve quality of care for heart disease and stroke patients
- Bariatric Surgery Center of Excellence by the American Society for Metabolic and Bariatric Surgery

== Hospital rating data ==
The HealthGrades website contains the clinical quality data for Doctors Hospital of Laredo, as of 2017. For this rating section three different types of data from HealthGrades are presented: clinical quality ratings for twenty-six inpatient conditions and procedures, thirteen patient safety indicators and the percentage of patients giving the hospital as a 9 or 10 (the two highest possible ratings).

For inpatient conditions and procedures, there are three possible ratings: worse than expected, as expected, better than expected. For this hospital the data for this category is:

- Worse than expected - 6
- As expected - 15
- Better than expected - 5

For patient safety indicators, there are the same three possible ratings. For this hospital safety indicators were rated as:

- Worse than expected - 0
- As expected - 13
- Better than expected - 0

Percentage of patients rating this hospital as a 9 or 10 - 66% Percentage of patients who on average rank hospitals as a 9 or 10 - 69%
