= Baylor Scott & White Health =

Healthcare system based in Texas, United States

- Type: Not-For-Profit
- Industry: health care
- Founded: 2013 (merger); 1904 (Scott & White Health); 1903 (Baylor Healthcare System)
- Headquarters: Dallas, Texas, USA
- Number of locations: 52 hospitals
- Area served: Central Texas; North Texas
- Key people: Pete McCanna (CEO)
- Revenue: 1,225,874,416 United States dollar (2022)
- Total assets: 1,704,387,861 United States dollar (2022)
- Number of employees: 47,000 (2025)
- Website: www.bswhealth.com

Baylor Scott & White Health is a healthcare system based in Dallas, Texas, United States. Formed in 2013 from the merger of Scott & White Health with Baylor Healthcare System, it became the largest non-profit healthcare system in Texas and one of the largest in the country. Its network contains over 50 hospitals and more than 800 patient care sites. The organization also includes the Baylor Scott & White Health Plan insurance company.

In April 2026, the organization announced that it would be discontinuing participation in Medicaid and individual ACA marketplace health plans, impacting 225,000 Texas residents who participate in those plans and 321 employees. The company in a statement said the decision was based on changes in "the state’s Medicaid procurement decision and Individual Marketplace complexities."

== Hospitals ==
Baylor Scott & White Health has 52 hospitals across Texas, including some that are joint ventures with other healthcare systems. Below is a list of the hospitals that are owned by Baylor Scott & White Health.

Hospital	City	Licensed Beds	Trauma Level
Baylor Scott & White All Saints Medical Center	Fort Worth, TX	538	III
Baylor Scott & White Heart and Vascular Hospital - Dallas	Dallas, TX	53	
Baylor Scott & White McLane Children's Medical Center	Temple, TX	115	II
Baylor Scott & White Medical Center - Austin	Austin, TX	25	
Baylor Scott & White Medical Center - Brenham	Brenham, TX	55	IV
Baylor Scott & White Medical Center - Buda	Buda, TX	15	
Baylor Scott & White Medical Center - Centennial	Frisco, TX	68	III
Baylor Scott & White Medical Center - College Station	College Station, TX	135	III
Baylor Scott & White Medical Center - Grapevine	Grapevine, TX	302	II
Baylor Scott & White Medical Center - Hillcrest	Waco, TX	210	II
Baylor Scott & White Medical Center - Irving	Irving, TX	222	
Baylor Scott & White Medical Center - Lake Pointe	Rowlett, TX	176	II
Baylor Scott & White Medical Center - Lakeway	Lakeway, TX	106	IV
Baylor Scott & White Medical Center - Marble Falls	Marble Falls, TX	46	IV
Baylor Scott & White Medical Center - McKinney	McKinney, TX	143	II
Baylor Scott & White Medical Center - Pflugerville	Pflugerville, TX	25	
Baylor Scott & White Medical Center - Plano	Plano, TX	160	
Baylor Scott & White Medical Center - Round Rock	Round Rock, TX	190	IV
Baylor Scott & White Medical Center - Sunnyvale	Sunnyvale, TX	70	
Baylor Scott & White Medical Center - Temple	Temple, TX	634	I
Baylor Scott & White Medical Center - Waxahachie	Waxahachie, TX	112	IV
Baylor Scott & White Orthopedic and Spine Hospital - Arlington	Arlington, TX	24	
Baylor Scott & White Surgical Hospital - Fort Worth	Fort Worth, TX	30	
Baylor Scott & White The Heart Hospital - Denton	Denton, TX	22	
Baylor Scott & White The Heart Hospital - Plano	Plano, TX	109	
Baylor University Medical Center - Dallas	Dallas, TX	824	I
