= Cook Children's Medical Center =

- Cook Children's Health Care System

Geography
- Location: 801 7th Ave., Fort Worth, Texas, United States
- Coordinates: 32.73648°N 97.3408°W

Services
- Emergency department: Level II Pediatric Trauma Center
- Beds: 443

Helipads
- Helipad: FAA LID: XA36
Number	Length		Surface
Number	ft	m	Surface
H1	50 x 50	15 × 15	rooftop
H2	50 x 50	15 × 15	rooftop

History
- Founded: 1918

Links
- Website: www.cookchildrens.org
- Lists: Hospitals in Texas

Cook Children's Medical Center is a not-for-profit pediatric hospital located in Fort Worth, Texas. One of the largest freestanding pediatric medical centers in the U.S., Cook Children's main campus is located in Tarrant County. The hospital provides comprehensive pediatric specialties and subspecialties to infants, children, teens, and young adults aged 0–21 throughout the Dallas-Fort Worth metro and the greater region. Cook Children's also has an ACS verified level II pediatric trauma center. The hospital has a rooftop helipad for the critical transport of pediatric patients to and from the hospital.

== History ==
The first children's hospital in the area began with the organization of the Fort Worth Free Baby Hospital on March 21, 1918. The hospital opened its doors with only 30 beds. A second floor was added in 1922 to include care for older children and adolescents and the hospital was eventually renamed The Fort Worth Children's Hospital.

In 1961, the hospital was expanded to a new location to support the influx of children due to the polio outbreak. In 1985, the hospital merged with Cook Children's Hospital to become Fort Worth Children's Medical Center, and in 1989, the facility was renamed Cook Children's Medical Center. Since 1995, the medical center has been a part of the Cook Children's Health Care system. A not-for-profit organization, the system comprises eight companies, including the Medical Center, Physician Network, Home Health, Northeast Hospital, Pediatric Surgery Center, Health Plan, Health Services Inc., and Health Foundation.

In 2006, Garth Brooks donated 4.5 million dollars for a new MRI machine. It was first used on February 20, 2007. When Hurricane Katrina first hit New Orleans in August 2005, Cook Children's (along with other hospitals) sent helicopters and personnel to Tulane Medical Center, Ochsner, and CHNOLA in order to help evacuate pediatric patients from the hospital.

Today, Cook Children's is one of the largest pediatric health care systems in the southwest with over 1 million patient encounters each year through its more than 60 pediatric medical offices and specialty clinics.

Cook Children's 430-bed medical center includes a level IV neonatal intensive care unit, providing the highest level of care possible for micro-preemies, premature babies, newborns and infants. Cook Children's emergency department was expanded in 2016 and sees over 120,000 patients each year. With the expansion of the new south tower in 2017, the medical opened a pediatric behavioral health center with inpatient and outpatient services to address the shortage the nation faces in mental and behavioral health programs for children and adolescents. The nationally accredited heart center also expanded its cardiac intensive care unit and cardiothoracic surgery unit and added its 3-D technology lab.

== Facilities ==
Cook Children Medical Center is a 530,000 square foot facility with 452 licensed beds. The level II trauma center provides 24-hour emergency care and treats more than 100,000 patients annually. Cook Children's Teddy Bear Transport team provided 3,555 patient transports in 2016.

The main campus in Fort Worth and the Prosper campus, in Prosper, TX, are part of the Cook Children’s Health Care System: a not-for-profit organization that includes three surgery centers, 43 pediatric medical offices, and more than 60 specialty clinics.

== Awards ==
Cook Children's is consistently recognized as one of the best children's hospitals in the nation by U.S. News & World Report, is a four-time Magnet designated hospital and was named a Leapfrog Group Top Hospital in 2015.
