= Houston Methodist Willowbrook Hospital =

Coordinates: 29.967284°N 95.550239°W

- Houston Methodist
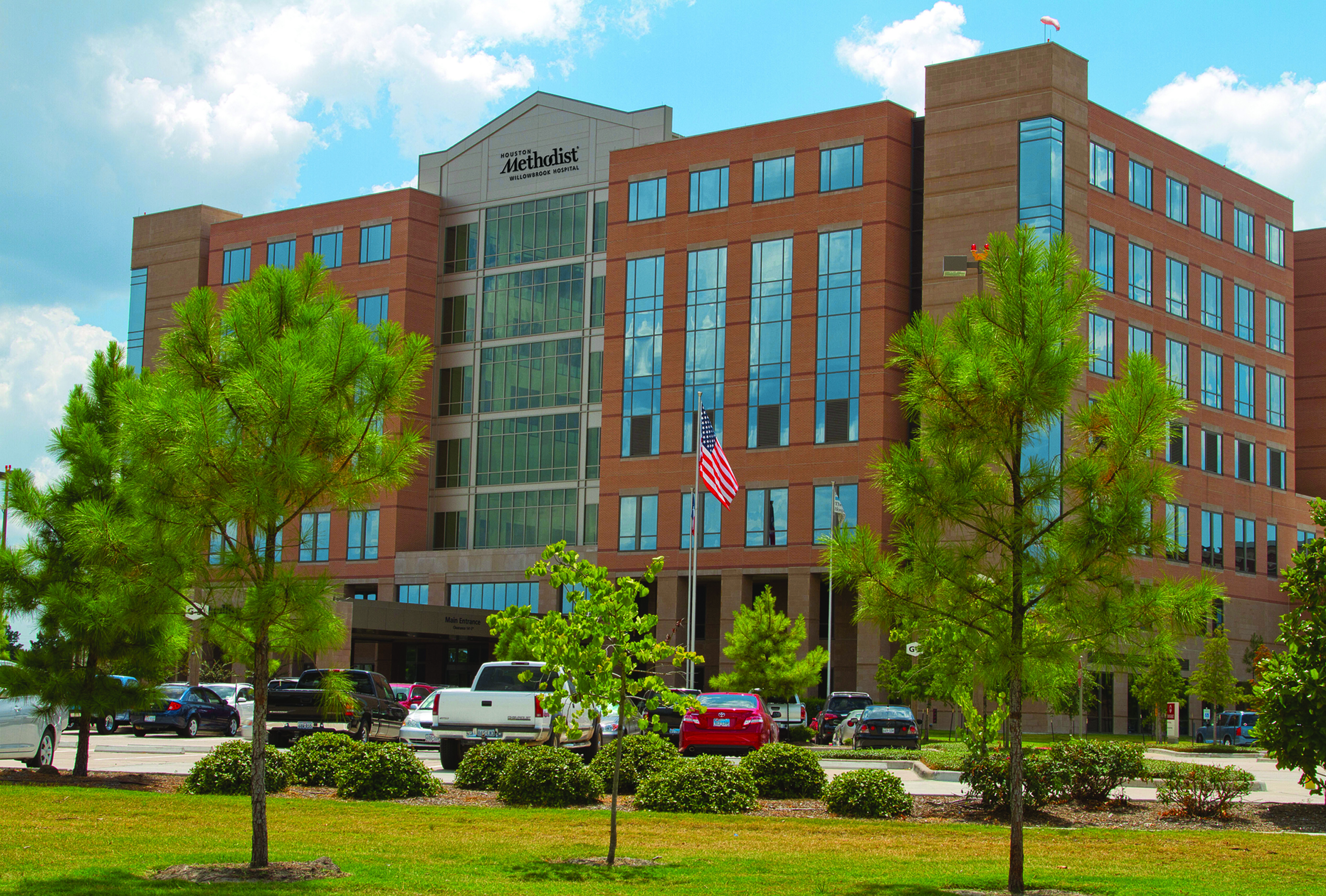

Geography
- Location: 18220 State Hwy. 249, Houston, Texas, United States

Organization
- Care system: Non-profit

Links
- Website: https://www.houstonmethodist.org/locations/willowbrook/
- Lists: Hospitals in Texas

Houston Methodist Willowbrook Hospital, located in Houston, Texas, is one of seven community hospitals that are part of Houston Methodist. It employs more than 2,100 people, has an estimated 1,000 affiliated doctors and admits more than 18,000 patients annually. The hospital serves communities in and around Northwest Houston.

== History ==
The hospital opened Dec. 18, 2000.

== Accolades ==
In 2019, Houston Methodist Willowbrook was re-designated as a Magnet hospital by the American Nurses Credentialing Center (ANCC).

In 2018, U.S. News & World Report ranked Houston Methodist Willowbrook No. 7 in Houston and No. 10 in Texas.
