= Houston Methodist Hospital =

Hospital in Houston, Texas, USA

Coordinates: 29°42′36″N 95°23′59″W

- Houston Methodist

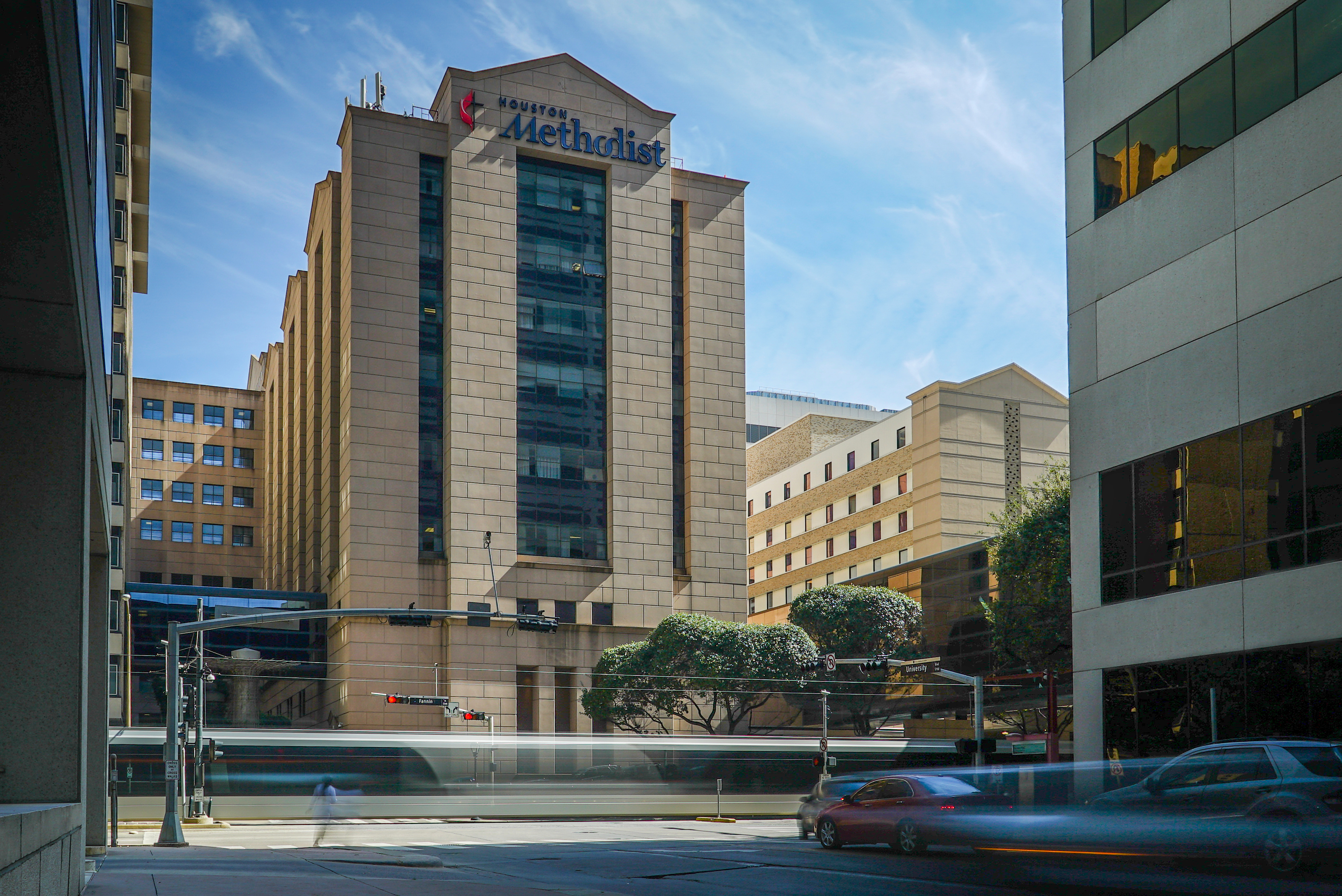

Geography
- Location: 6565 Fannin Street, Houston, Texas, US

Organisation
- Care system: Non-profit
- Type: Academic Medical Center and seven community hospitals
- Religious affiliation: Christianity - Texas Annual Conference of the United Methodist Church
- Affiliated university: Weill Cornell Medical College

Services
- Emergency department: Yes
- Beds: 1,020 - (Main Campus); 2,767 - (Health System)

History
- Founded: 1919

Links
- Website: houstonmethodist.org

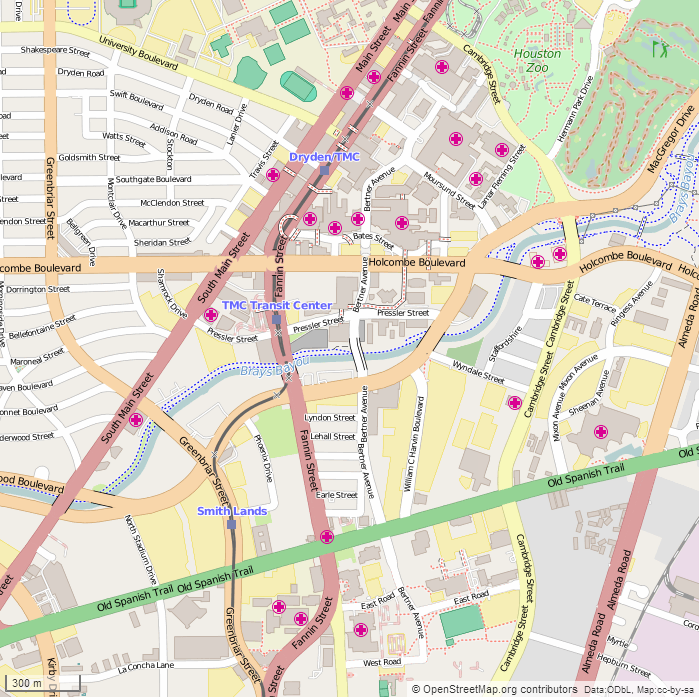
Location within Texas Medical Center

Houston Methodist Hospital is the flagship quaternary care hospital of Houston Methodist academic medical center. Located in the Texas Medical Center in Houston, Texas, Houston Methodist Hospital was established in 1919 during the height of the Spanish influenza epidemic as an outreach ministry of Methodist Episcopal Church. Houston Methodist comprises eight hospitals, an academic institute, a primary care group, and more than 300 locations throughout greater Houston.

The hospital has consistently ranked as "One of America's Best Hospitals" according to U.S. News & World Report. The hospital has earned worldwide recognition in multiple specialties including cardiovascular surgery, cancer, epilepsy treatment and organ transplantation.

Houston Methodist System changed its official name to Houston Methodist in 2013, to distinguish themselves from the 80+ Methodist Hospitals in the U.S. and to reflect their Houston roots.

== History ==
Originally located near downtown Houston, after a $1 million donation from Lillie and Hugh Roy Cullen, the hospital relocated to the Texas Medical Center and opened a 300-bed facility in 1951.

=== Michael DeBakey ===
Heart surgeon Michael E. DeBakey (1908–2008), a faculty member and later Chancellor Emeritus of Baylor College of Medicine, performed the first removal of a carotid artery blockage (1950); the first aorto-coronary bypass surgery (1964); the first use of a ventricular assist device to pump blood and support a diseased heart (1966); and some of the first U.S. heart transplants (1968 and 1969) at the hospital. DeBakey also created the first Dacron graft (1953).

=== Flooding and storms ===
==== 1976 flood ====
In 1976, unusually heavy rains caused more than $20 million in flood-related damage in the Texas Medical Center, knocking out power at three hospitals. Six feet of water filled Methodist's basement.

==== Tropical Storm Allison ====
On June 8, 2001, Tropical Storm Allison dropped up to 37 inches of rain on parts of Houston, causing the worst flooding in the city's history up until that time, with serious damage to the Texas Medical Center. About 40 feet of water filled Methodist Hospital's basement and entered the neurosensory building. The hospital discharged 400 patients and did not fully reopen until five weeks after the storm. The flooding caused an estimated $360 million in damage.

=== Expansion ===
Consisting of the existing Texas Medical Center facility and several newly constructed regional hospitals, Houston Methodist was established in 1996 to extend health services beyond the Texas Medical Center and into communities throughout Houston.

== Research ==
Houston Methodist, the University of Houston, and Weill Cornell Medical College of Cornell University jointly founded the Institute for Biomedical Imaging Science. The institute will create interdisciplinary programs in biomedical imaging and will develop joint training programs to produce basic and applied scientists.

In 2019, Texas A&M Health Science Center College of Medicine in partnership with Houston Methodist Hospital launched the EnMed program which is an Engineering Medicine program, offering a combined MD and master's in engineering.

== Locations ==
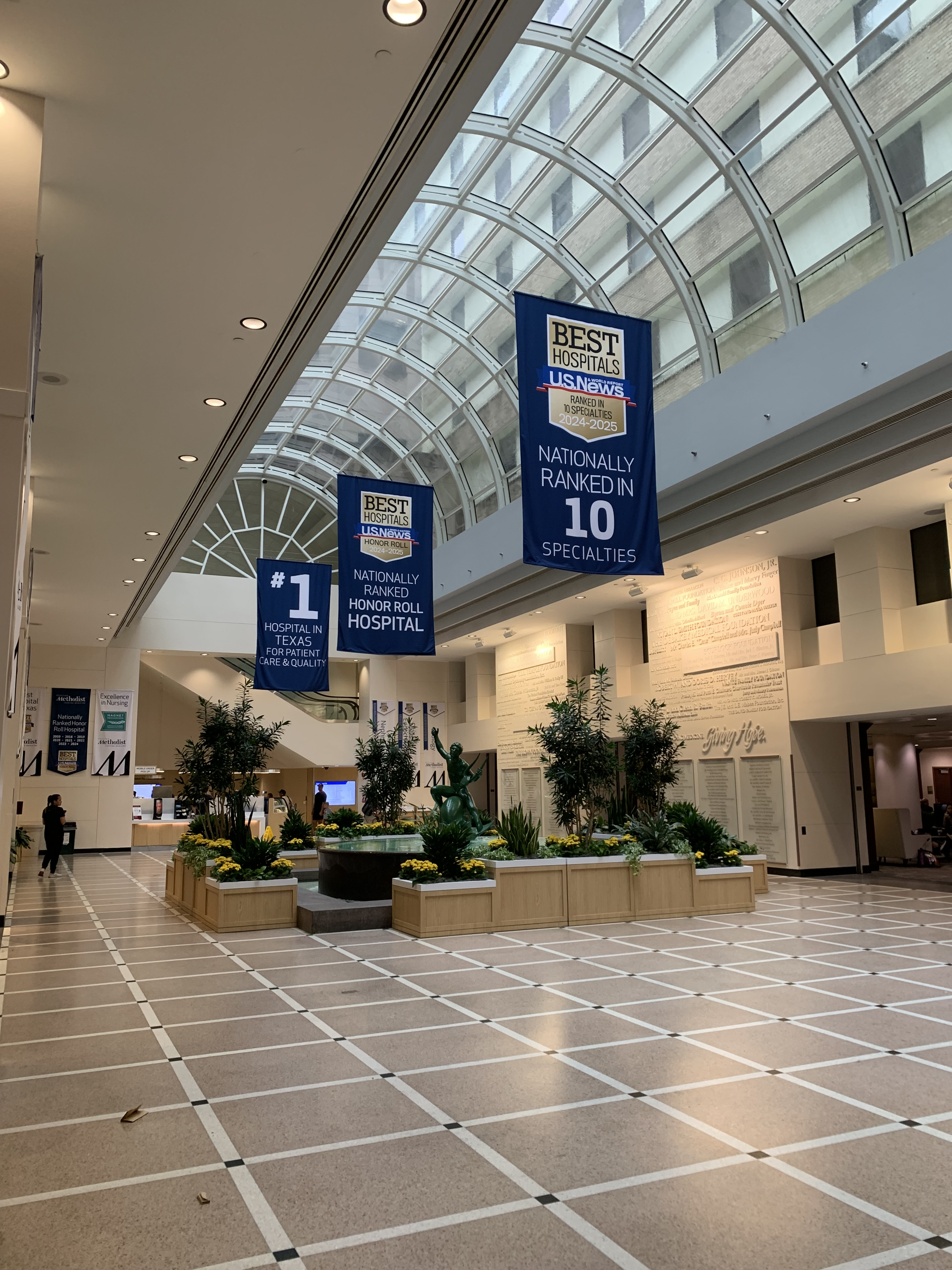
Dunn Tower atrium at the Main Campus

Houston Methodist comprises seven community hospitals, a continuing care hospital, as well as several emergency centers and physical therapy clinics throughout greater Houston, including:

- Houston Methodist Hospital opened in 1919 near downtown Houston. In 1951 the hospital moved to The Texas Medical Center at 6565 Fannin Street, Houston, TX 77030. In 2018, Houston Methodist Hospital has 900 licensed beds, 1,890 affiliated physicians, and 7,420 employees.
- In 1983, Houston Methodist Baytown Hospital in Baytown, Texas (formerly Houston Methodist San Jacinto Hospital) became affiliated with Houston Methodist. Opened in 1948, Houston Methodist Baytown Hospital was funded by Humble Oil and Refining Company and donations from other local business, organizations and individuals. Houston Methodist Baytown Hospital is located at 4401 Garth Road, Baytown, Texas 77521.
- In 1998, Houston Methodist Sugar Land Hospital opened at 16655 Southwest Freeway, Sugar Land, Texas 77479, as part of Houston Methodist.
- Houston Methodist Willowbrook Hospital opened in December 2000 as part of Houston Methodist. Located at 18220 State Highway 249, Houston, Texas 77070,
- Houston Methodist West Hospital opened in December 2010. Located at 18500 Katy Freeway, Houston, Texas 77094, Houston Methodist West serves Katy, Texas and the West Houston area.
- Houston Methodist Clear Lake Hospital (formerly Houston Methodist St. John Hospital) is located at 18300 Houston Methodist Dr., Nassau Bay, TX 77058. Serving the Greater Bay Area with 657 affiliated physicians and 858 employees. It admits more than 5,700 patients annually. Houston Methodist Clear Lake Hospital provides adult, medical, surgical and obstetrical care, as well as numerous ambulatory services.
- Houston Methodist The Woodlands Hospital opened in 2017 at the intersection of TX 242 and I-45. This is a full-service, acute care hospital with many of the same services as the Texas Medical Center. It has 553 affiliated physicians and 900 employees.
- Houston Methodist Continuing Care Hospital, located at 701 S. Fry Road, Katy, TX 77450, is a long-term acute care hospital (LTACH) serving the Greater Houston area, for patients requiring extended hospitalization. As an extension of Houston Methodist West Hospital just two miles away, several outpatient services are offered on the Houston Methodist Continuing Care campus, including imaging, outpatient rehabilitation, cardiac rehabilitation and wound care.
- Houston Methodist Cypress Hospital, announced in May 2021, to be located on the east side of the Northwest Freeway between Barker-Cypress and Skinner roads.

== Rankings ==
U.S. News & World Report routinely names Houston Methodist Hospital as one of its “Best Hospitals,” most recently in 2025 where it was regionally ranked number one in Texas and within the top 20 nationally. Houston Methodist is nationally ranked in ten specialties and achieved maximum points for superior performance in 17 out of 17 common adult procedures and conditions.

== Innovation ==
Houston Methodist has a dedicated center for innovation in digital platforms for healthcare delivery

== Notable procedures ==
- 1968 – The world's first multi-organ transplant and Michael DeBakey's first heart transplant.
- 1985 – The first heart-lung transplant in Texas
- 1985 – Hartwell Whisennand performs the first liver transplant
- 1998 – Michael J. Reardon performs the first successful auto-transplant for cardiac malignancy
- 2007 – Gerald Lawrie performs the world's first “American Correction” mitral valve repair using the da Vinci surgical robot
- 2015 – Physicians perform the world's first skull and scalp transplant, plus kidney and pancreas transplants, on one patient.

== Affiliated schools/institutions ==
=== Academic affiliations ===
Houston Methodist is an academic medical center affiliated with Weill Cornell Medical College and the Weill Cornell Graduate School of Medical Sciences of Cornell University, as well as NewYork-Presbyterian Hospital. From 1950 to 2004, Houston Methodist was affiliated with Baylor College of Medicine.

Other affiliations include

- Rice University: Digital Health Institute; the Center for Neural Systems Restoration; and the Center for Human Performance
- Texas A&M Health Science Center College of Medicine

=== Religious affiliation ===
Houston Methodist is a Christian hospital network affiliated with the United Methodist Church by means of the Texas Annual Conference of the United Methodist Church.

== COVID-19 vaccine requirement ==
Houston Methodist hospital has required its employees to get the COVID-19 vaccine by June 7, 2021. It was the nation's first hospital system to require its employees to get vaccinated against COVID-19, a disease that, as of June 2021, had caused more than 3.7 million deaths worldwide.

As part of the mandate, the hospital system's 26,000 employees were required to get their first COVID-19 shot by June 7, 2021. This wasn't the first vaccine the hospital had mandated. The flu vaccine has been mandated for all Houston Methodist employees since 2009.

Ultimately, 99% of employees complied with the hospital's COVID-19 mandate. Less than 0.6% of employees quit or were fired because they refused to get vaccinated, and a small number of employees were exempt or allowed to defer for medical reasons.

Prior to taking action on the June 7 vaccination deadline, the hospital first suspended the 178 employees who were not yet vaccinated. During this two-week suspension, 25 more employees got vaccinated.

Dr. Marc Boom, CEO of Houston Methodist, said as healthcare workers, we have "a sacred obligation to care for patients" and that mandating the vaccine was consistent with "our responsibility to keep patients safe". More recently, Dr. Boom has also said he has no regrets about his decision, adding that the mandate was "the best decision we ever made." The hospital's CEO credits it to keeping 300 employees from getting sick during the Delta surge over the 2021 summer, according to a hospital analysis. Of those who did get sick during the surge, Dr. Boom said that these employees reported less severe symptoms and, importantly, no employees died.

There was pushback against the mandate, but it was small and short-lived. 117 employees challenged the vaccine requirement by suing the hospital, claiming the vaccine was “experimental”. Many such lawsuits were backed by prominent anti-vaxxers like Robert F. Kennedy Jr. The group of medical workers staged a walk out on June 7. U.S. District Judge Lynn Hughes dismissed the lawsuit on June 12, 2021, calling the plaintiff's allegations that the vaccine was experimental "false" and adding that the hospital's policy doesn't violate state or federal law and isn’t considered “coercion”. On June 22, 2021, 153 Houston Methodist employees either resigned or were terminated for refusing to be vaccinated for COVID-19.

Hospitals across the nation have since followed Houston Methodist in requiring COVID-19 vaccination for employees, with about 41% of hospitals nationwide having some sort of mandate in place as of October 2021.

As of December 1st, 2023 the hospital back pedaled on this policy ahead of the new state law passed by the Texas state legislature banning the requirement of COVID-19 vaccines by private employers. It should also be noted that the hospital system did not require follow up vaccination for the newer variants of COVID-19.
