= Houston Methodist Baytown Hospital =

Coordinates: 29.76877°N 94.97948°W

- Houston Methodist

Geography
- Location: 4401 Garth Road, Baytown, Texas, United States

Organization
- Care system: Non-profit

Links
- Website: https://www.houstonmethodist.org/locations/baytown/
- Lists: Hospitals in Texas

Houston Methodist Baytown Hospital, located in Baytown, Texas, near the San Jacinto Battle Monument, is one of seven community hospitals that are part of Houston Methodist. As of 2025, it employs about 1,900 people, has more than 900 affiliated physicians and admits more than 15,300 patients annually. The hospital serves communities in Harris, Chambers, Liberty and Montgomery counties.

== History ==
The hospital started in 1944 when the Humble Oil and Refining Company, now ExxonMobil, contributed $500,000 to construction of a hospital in Baytown. Local businesses, organizations and individuals added $1.2 million to Humble Oil's contribution. In 1948, the hospital opened as San Jacinto Memorial Hospital.

The hospital became part of Houston Methodist in 1983. It changed its name to Houston Methodist San Jacinto in 2013. Another renaming came in 2018 — Houston Methodist Baytown Hospital.

== Accolades ==
In 2016, Houston Methodist Baytown achieved distinction for nursing excellence and quality patient care by the Magnet Recognition Program of the American Nurses Credentialing Center.
