= Susan Dell =

American philanthropist

- Dell in December 2025
- Born: Susan Lynn Lieberman; 1963 or 1964 (age 62–63); Dallas, Texas, U.S.
- Education: Arizona State University
- Spouse: Michael Dell (m. 1989)
- Children: 4
- Relatives: Adam Dell (brother-in-law)

Susan Lynn Lieberman Dell (née Lieberman) is an American businesswoman, philanthropist, and the wife of Michael Dell. They married in 1989, four years after he formed his eponymous computer company. She is the co-founder and current chair of the Michael & Susan Dell Foundation.

== Early life ==
Dell was born in Dallas, Texas. Her father was surgical oncologist Zelig "Zeck" Lieberman, who worked at Baylor University Medical Center. She has two brothers and is of Jewish descent. Following the suggestion of her mother's friend, she was a runway model for the Kim Dawson Agency during junior high. She studied fashion merchandising and design at Arizona State University.

== Career ==
=== Philanthropy ===
In 1999, Dell and her husband Michael founded the Michael & Susan Dell Foundation, a private foundation focused on improving opportunities for children and families. The foundation focused its work on education and healthcare initiatives in Austin and the United States, before expanding its activities internationally, establishing branch offices in India and South Africa.

She served on the Council for Physical Fitness and Sports under President George W. Bush.

Following Hurricane Harvey in 2017, Dell led the foundation's humanitarian response for Texas, pledging over 43 million dollars as part of the wider Rebuild Texas Fund. Her work in establishing a wide network of support for Texans following the disaster led to her being inducted into the Texas Women's Hall of Fame in 2018.

In March 2025, she and her husband were awarded the History-Making Texan Award by the Texas State History Museum Foundation in recognition of their philanthropic work.

In May 2025, Time reported that, since 1999, she and her husband have given away nearly 3 billion dollars in total as part of their foundation's initiatives.

In December 2025, she and her husband announced they would be donating over 6 billion dollars to fund investment accounts for at least 25 million children in the United States as part of the Trump accounts initiative. It has been called "one of the largest private investments in American children in history". The couple appeared at the White House together with President Donald Trump in 2026 to celebrate the creation of the accounts. Her appearance at the event drew online commentary, prompting her husband and Eric Trump to publicly defend her.

=== Fashion ===
In 2000, Dell opened her own high-end boutique named after herself in Austin. The building was designed by architect Charles Gwathmey.

In January 2001, Dell was commissioned to design the inaugural ball gowns for Barbara and Jenna Bush, the daughters of President George W. Bush, for his first inauguration. His wife, Laura Bush, had called Dell after seeing the ball gowns she had designed for women in Austin.

She went on to found the fashion label Phi in 2003. The brand would present its first ready-to-wear women's collection at New York Fashion Week in February 2004. The Norwegian fashion designer Andreas Melbostad was the creative director for womenswear at Phi. The brand would eventually cease operations by 2009.

== Personal life ==
Dell (then Lieberman) met her husband, Michael Dell, in 1988 when they worked at Trammell Crow together. They married in October 1989.

She is an accomplished athlete, having competed in the Ironman World Championship.

She has four children. She and her family continue to live in Austin, with their family home having been dubbed "the Castle" by locals.
