= Charles Fraser (surgeon) =

American surgeon

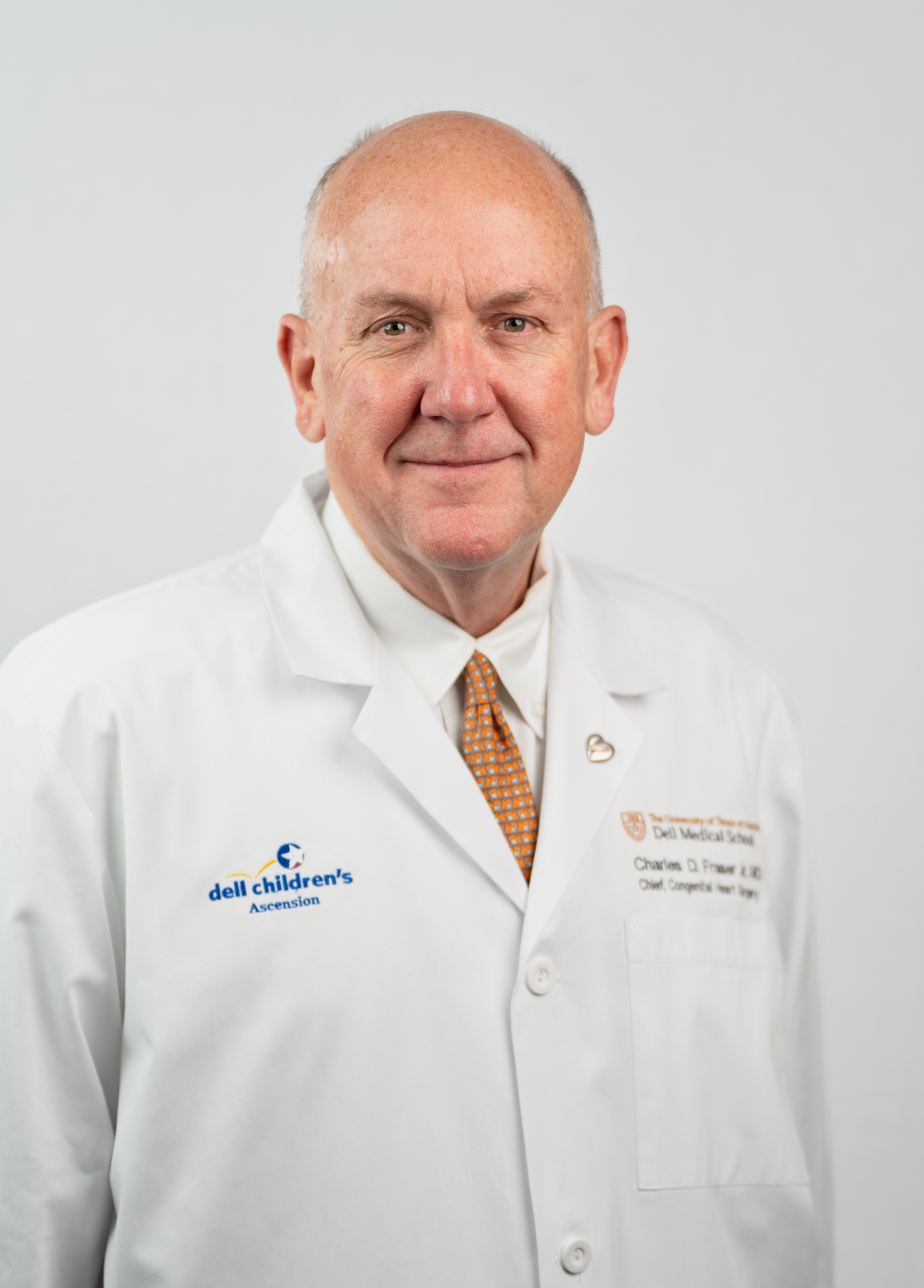
Portrait of Dr. Charles D. Fraser Jr. taken at Dell Children's Medical Center in Austin, TX March 2022 by Matthew Hooker.

Charles D Fraser, Jr. is an American pediatric and congenital heart surgeon and academic physician based in Austin, TX. He is the inaugural Raymond Family Chair in Cardiovascular Health in leads the Department of Cardiovascular and Thoracic Surgery at the University of Texas at Austin's Dell Medical School. He also serves as the Executive Director of both the Texas Center for Pediatric and Congenital Heart Disease, a joint partnership between the University of Texas at Austin and Dell Children's Medical Center, and the Institute for Cardiovascular Health, a joint partnership between the University of Texas at Austin and Ascension Seton. In addition, Fraser holds the John L. Hern Distinguished Chair in Pediatric Cardiothoracic Surgery at Dell Children's Medical Center. Formerly, Fraser was Chief of congenital heart surgery and cardiac Surgeon-in-Chief at Texas Children's Hospital, the nation's largest pediatric hospital, served as chief of the Congenital Heart Surgery Division at Baylor College of Medicine, and director of the Adult Congenital Heart Surgery Program at the Texas Heart Institute.

== Career ==
Dr. Fraser is a native Texan. He was born in Austin, Texas and raised in Midland, Texas. Following his graduation from Midland High School, Fraser attended the University of Texas at Austin where he was a member of the varsity tennis team - Southwest Conference Champions in 1977. He received his bachelor's degree cum laude in mathematics from the University of Texas in 1980. After completing his medical degree at University of Texas Medical Branch, Fraser studied as a resident at Johns Hopkins Hospital, where he specialized in general, cardiothoracic and thoracic transplant surgery. Fraser has completed three fellowships: pediatric cardiac surgery at the Royal Children's Hospital, cardiac transplant research at the Johns Hopkins Hospital and cardiovascular surgery at the Texas Heart Institute.

In 1995, Fraser was recruited by Texas Children's Hospital and Baylor College of Medicine to establish their then-new congenital heart surgery program. He served as chief of the Division of Congenital Heart Surgery at Baylor College of Medicine from 1995-2018.

In 2011, he was appointed cardiac surgeon-in-chief of Texas Children's Hospital.

In 2018, Fraser joined UT Health Austin, as a tenured Professor of Surgery, Perioperative Care and Pediatrics in the University of Texas, Dell Medical School in Austin, Texas where he serves as Director of the Texas Center for Pediatric and Congenital Heart Disease and Chief of the Division of Cardiothoracic Surgery. Dr. Fraser was recruited to the University of Texas to develop an integrated center focused on pediatric and congenital cardiac care. The center’s mission is to provide holistic, family centered care in a value-based, outcomes driven program.

== Accomplishments ==
Dr. Fraser’s clinical career has been dedicated to the surgical treatment of congenital heart disease and has included the development of leading pediatric heart and lung transplant and mechanical circulatory support programs. Dr. Fraser’s research interests have included congenital heart surgery outcomes, cardiopulmonary transplantation, mechanical circulatory support, neurologic protection, and bioengineering.

In 2002, Fraser's team developed the first pediatric lung transplant program in the Southwest United States, which grew to become the largest in the nation. In March 2004, Fraser implanted the world's first pediatric ventricular assist device. In 2005, he performed the first successful pediatric heart/lung transplant in the Southwest. Fraser has published over 300 journal articles, chapters, and textbooks in medical literature, and has performed over 18,000 congenital cardiac repair surgeries in children.

Fraser served as the national principal investigator of a pediatric ventricular assist device trial to assess the safety and benefit of the Berlin Heart Pediatric EXCOR ventricular assist device. This device was subsequently approved in December 2011 by the U.S. Food and Drug Administration for clinical use – the first device to be approved specifically for small babies.

In 2011, Fraser's heart failure team implanted the first total artificial heart at a children's hospital.

=== Awards ===
- 1999: University of Texas Outstanding Young Alumnus Award
- 2002: American Heart Association Medical Honoree
- 2004: Baylor College of Medicine Michael E. DeBakey Distinguished Service Award
- 2013: University of Texas Distinguished Alumnus Award
- 2017: the Texas Children's Heart Center, which Fraser co-directed, achieved the #1 ranking for pediatric heart programs as noted by U.S. News & World Report.
- 2023: John L. Hern Foundation Distinguished Chair in Pediatric Cardiothoracic Surgery - inaugural appointee, Dell Children's Medical Center
- 2024: University of Texas at Austin Presidential Citation Award

== Appearances in popular media ==
Fraser was featured in the Discovery Channel Series Surgery Saved My Life, where in the episode "Train Wreck Heart", he performed a transposition of the great arteries correction procedure on a five-day-old newborn. Charles Fraser, Jr., MD, leads Texas Center for Pediatric and Congenital Heart Disease at Dell Children's Medical Center
