= Frederick Masoudi =

American cardiologist

- Born: 1965 (age 60–61); Denver, Colorado
- Education: Amherst College; University of Colorado Denver; Johns Hopkins University School of Medicine
- Occupations: Cardiologist, professor

Frederick A. Masoudi (born 1965, Denver, Colorado, United States) is an American cardiologist with expertise in cardiovascular outcomes research, clinical registries and quality measurement.

== Education ==
An alumnus of Amherst College (BA, 1987), he earned an MD from Johns Hopkins School of Medicine (1992) and completed his residency and chief residency at University of California, San Francisco (1996). He also holds an MS in public health from the University of Colorado Denver (2001).

== Career ==
He is a practicing cardiologist, and Professor of Internal Medicine at the Dell Medical School. He also is Visiting Clinical Professor of Cardiology at University of Colorado School of Medicine, where he formerly was a tenured professor, physician-scientist, and a senior member of the Colorado Cardiovascular Outcomes Research Consortium. Masoudi has served as the Chair of the American College of Cardiology (ACC)/American Heart Association (AHA) Task Force on Performance Measures (2007–2010); is the vice-chair of the AHA Quality of Care and Outcomes Council; and is an Associate Editor of the journal Circulation He has been involved with the National Cardiovascular Data Registry since 2007.

== Personal life ==
He and his wife, physician Marie Johnson Masoudi, had three children, two of whom perished when a single-engine plane crashed into the vacation home where the family was staying.

== Selected publications ==
- Masoudi FA, Havranek EP, Wolfe P, Rathore SS, Gross CP, Steiner JF, Ordin DL, Krumholz HM. Most hospitalized older persons do not meet the enrollment criteria of clinical trials in heart failure. Am Heart J 2003;146:250-257. PMID 12891192
- Masoudi FA, Wang Y, Inzucchi SI, Havranek EP, Setaro JF, Krumholz HF. Metformin and thiazolidinedione use in Medicare patients with heart failure. JAMA 2003;290:81-85. PMID 12837715
- Masoudi FA, Rathore SS, Wang Y, Havranek EP, Curtis JP, Foody JM, Krumholz HM. National patterns of use and effectiveness of angiotensin converting enzyme inhibitors in older patients hospitalized with heart failure and left ventricular systolic dysfunction. Circulation 2004;110:724-731. PMID 15289383
- Masoudi FA, Gross CP, Wang Y, Rathore SS, Havranek EP, Foody JM, Krumholz HM. Adoption of spironolactone therapy for older patients with heart failure and left ventricular systolic dysfunction: insights from the National Heart Care Project. Circulation 2005;112:39-47. PMID 15983243
- Masoudi FA, Baillie CA, Wang Y, Bradford WD, Steiner JF, Havranek EP, Foody JM, Krumholz HM. The complexity and cost of drug regimens of older patients hospitalized with heart failure in the United States, 1998–2001. Arch Intern Med 2005;165:2069-2076. PMID 16216996
- Matlock DD, Peterson PN, Heidenreich PA, Lucas FL, Malenka DJ, Wang Y, Curtis JP, Kutner JS, Fisher ES, Masoudi FA. Regional Variation in the Use of Implantable Cardioverter-Defibrillators for Primary Prevention: Results From the National Cardiovascular Data Registry. Circ Cardiovasc Qual Outcomes 2010. PMID 21139094
- Peterson PN, Shetterly SM, Clarke CL, Bekelman DB, Chan PS, Allen LA, Matlock DD, Magid DJ, Masoudi FA. Health literacy and outcomes among patients with heart failure. JAMA. 2011 Apr 27;305(16):1695-701. PMID 21521851.
