= Central Health (Texas) =

Hospital district of Travis County, Texas

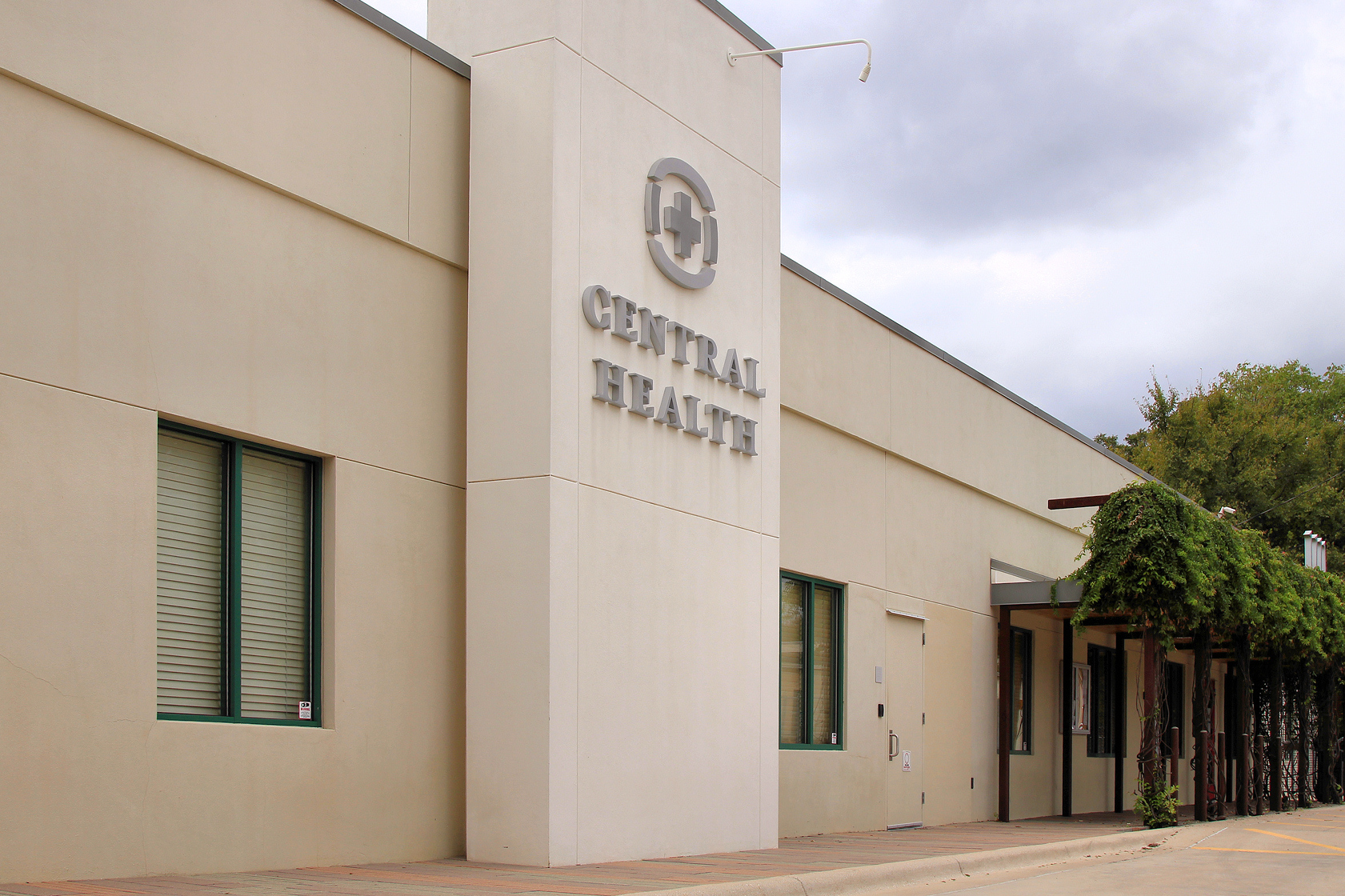
Central Health headquarters

Travis County Healthcare District, doing business as Central Health, is the hospital district of Travis County, Texas in the Austin metropolitan area. Its headquarters are in Austin.

It was established after an election on May 15, 2004, in which 31,920 Travis County voters voted in favor of creating the hospital district; the measure passed as the voters made up 54.73% of people who voted. Originally it was legally named Travis County Hospital District, but it took its current legal name in 2006.

It acquired ownership of the previously municipally owned Brackenridge Hospital in 2004. Brackenridge closed in 2017 and was replaced by Dell Seton Medical Center. The land of Brackenridge is owned by the University of Texas at Austin, and Central Health leases the land and subleases it to Seton Healthcare Family, which owns and operates the hospital itself.
