= Texas Children's Hospital =

Children's hospital located in Houston, Texas

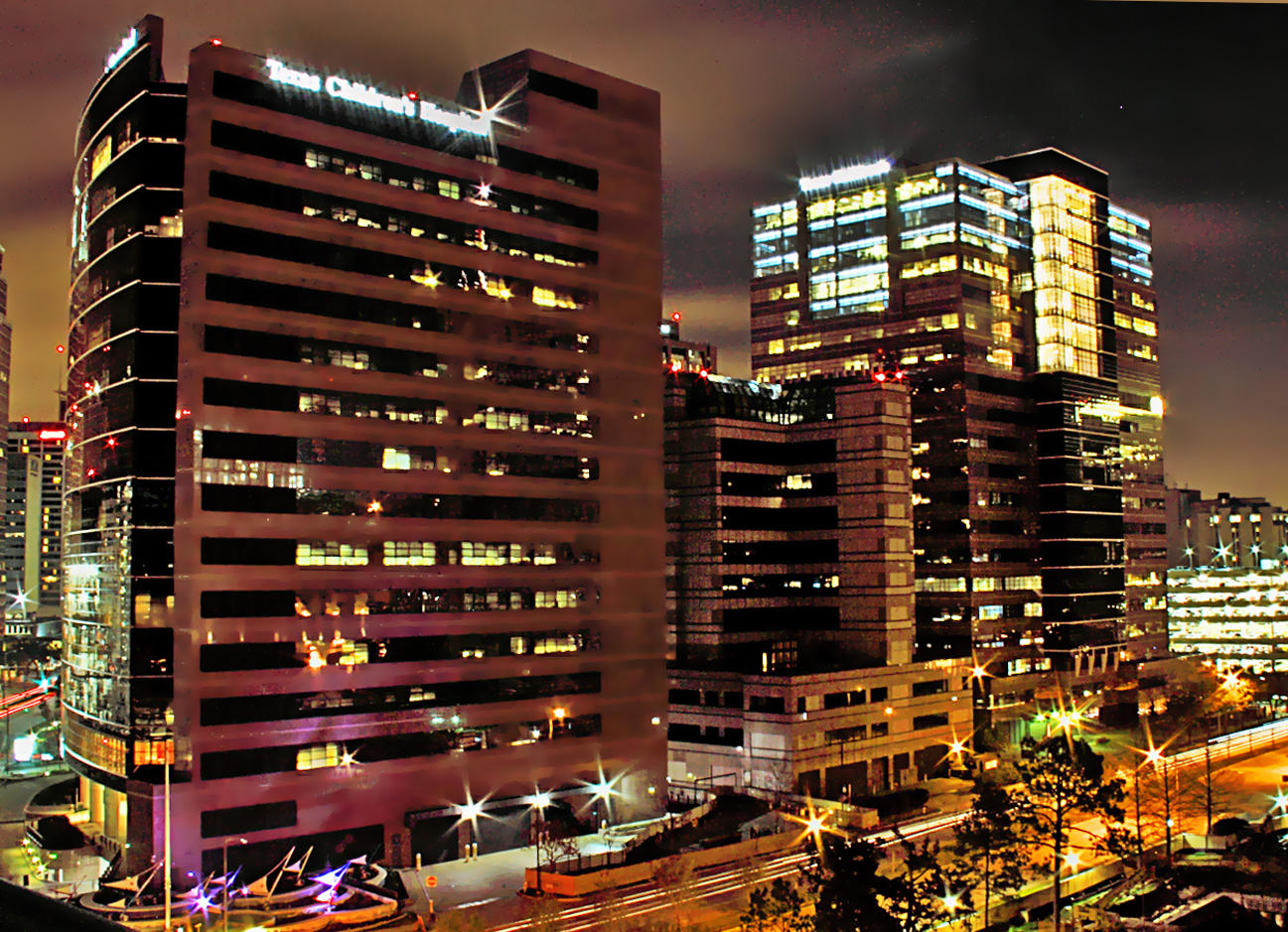
- Left to right: Wallace tower, Children's Nutrition Research Center, Feigin tower

Geography
- Location: Texas Medical Center, Houston, Texas, United States
- Coordinates: 29°42′28″N 95°24′06″W

Organization
- Type: Specialist
- Affiliated university: Baylor College of Medicine

Services
- Emergency department: Level 1 Pediatric Trauma Center
- Beds: 973
- Specialty: Children's hospital

Helipads
- Helipad: FAA LID: 7XS2

History
- Opened: February 1, 1954; 72 years ago

Links
- Website: www.texaschildrens.org
- Lists: Hospitals in Texas

Texas Children's Hospital is an acute care women's and children's hospital located in Houston, Texas. With 973 beds, it is the primary pediatric teaching hospital affiliated with Baylor College of Medicine and is located within the Texas Medical Center.

The hospital provides comprehensive pediatric specialty and subspecialty care to infants, children, teens, and young adults from age 0-21 throughout Texas and features an ACS verified level I pediatric trauma center. Its regional pediatric intensive-care unit and neonatal intensive care units serve the Southern United States region and also has programs to serve children from around the world. With 973 beds, it is the largest children's hospital in the United States.

In addition to its main site in the Texas Medical Center, Texas Children's Hospital has satellite campuses in the suburb of The Woodlands, at its West Campus near Houston's Energy Corridor neighborhood, and in Austin, TX. Texas Children's also has a network of clinics throughout the Houston metropolitan area and maintains partnerships with sites across the world through the Texas Children's Global Health Network.

Texas Children's Hospital is ranked as one of the best children's hospitals in the country and the world. The 2024-2025 edition of U.S. News & World Report ranked Texas Children's Hospital among the nation’s foremost leaders in pediatric health care, earning a place on the Best Children’s Hospitals Honor Roll and once again earning the No. 1 ranking in Texas. It has been recognized on the U.S. News & World Report Honor Roll for sixteen consecutive years.

In 2026 under threat from the State of Texas, Texas Children's agreed to a number of concessions, including firing any doctors who had previously provided transgender health care to patients, furnishing a list of all patients that had previously received such care, and opening the nation's first 'detransition clinic'.

== History ==
In 1940, the Texas Medical Center was first chartered as a set district. Texas Children's Foundation was formed to gain support to build a children's hospital and 6 acres were set aside for the planned hospital. Groundbreaking for the new building was held in May 1951.

As the hospital was being built, hospital leaders established a relationship with the Baylor College of Medicine to allow students to be taught at the new hospital. The original Texas Children's Hospital was planned to have 3 floors and 106 beds.

Texas Children's Hospital was first opened on February 1, 1954, creating the first children's hospital in Texas. From the start in 1954, physician-in-chief Russell Blattner, established a new policy that at least one parent may be with a child during a hospital stay, setting a standard for parental visitation now commonly seen at children's hospitals around the world.

In 1962, Texas Children's Hospital partnered with St. Luke's Episcopal Hospital to open up the Texas Heart Institute. Years later Texas Children's Hospital separated from the Texas Heart Institute instead establishing their own pediatric cardiology program.

Over the years, patient numbers at Texas Children's Hospital continuously increased. The hospital completed a $149-million expansion in 1989 that constructed two new buildings; the West Tower and the Wallace Tower. In addition to the new buildings, the hospital also renovated the main building known as the Abercrombie Building.

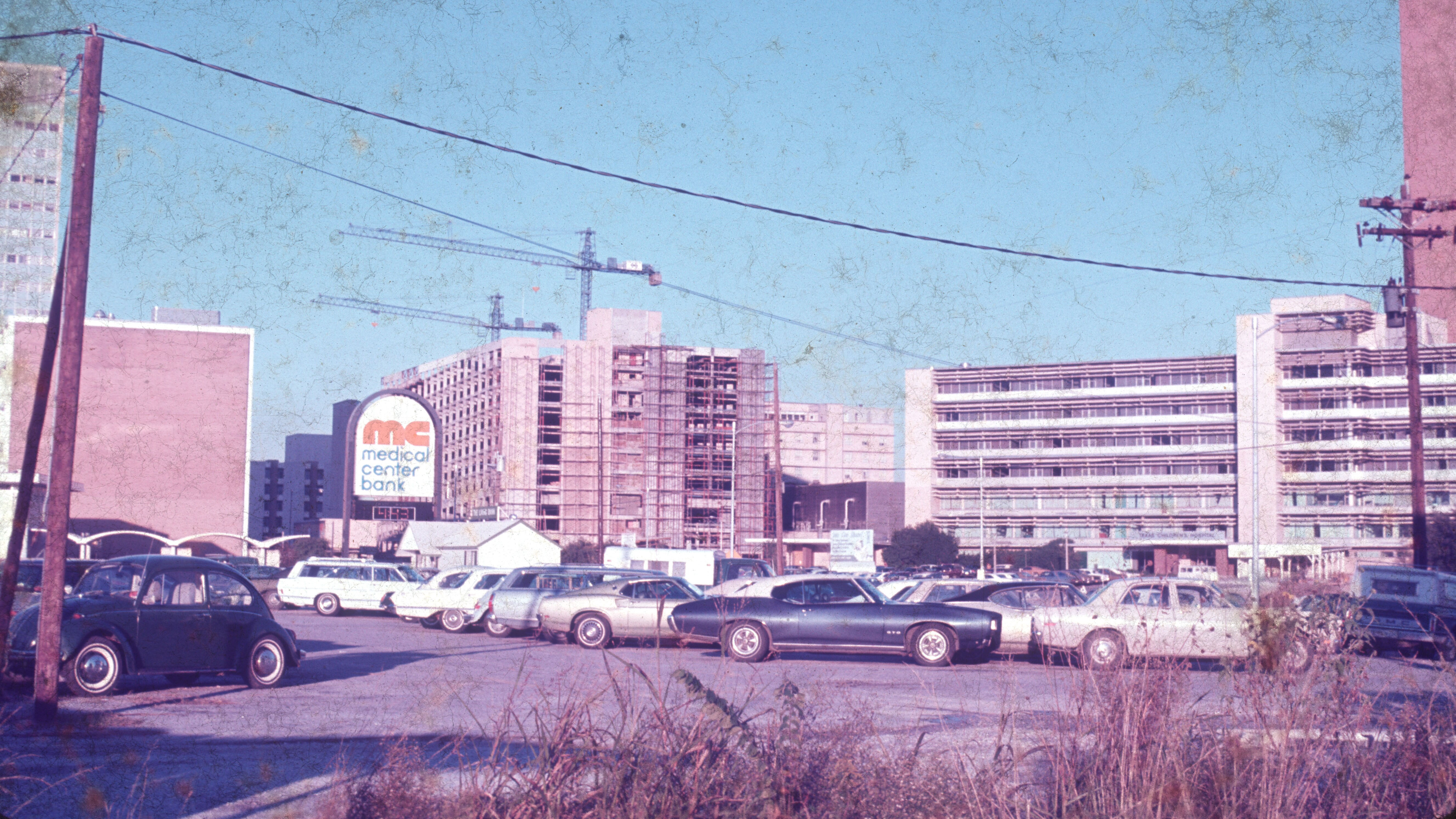
Texas Children's Hospital in December 1970

On September 21, 1971, the patient known as "Bubble Boy," David Vetter was born at the Texas Children's Hospital. Vetter was immediately placed into a sterile "bubble" because of his SCID diagnosis. The boy lived in the hospital throughout his life before being discharged a few years later. Eventually he went to the Dana–Farber Cancer Institute for an experimental stem cell transplant, but died days later after contracting Epstein–Barr from the marrow, which had been undetectable in the pre-transplant screening.

By 1993, the hospital officially had 465 licensed beds.

When Hurricane Katrina first hit New Orleans in August 2005, Texas Children's (along with other hospitals) sent helicopters to Tulane Medical Center, Ochsner, and CHNOLA in order to help evacuate pediatric patients from the hospital. In addition to helicopters, Texas Children's sent multiple fixed wing aircraft, ambulances, doctors, and nurses to Baton Rouge to help with patient care in New Orleans. In the aftermath of the storm, Texas Children's Hospital and Baylor College of Medicine also took in pediatric residents from Tulane to continue their education. Texas Children's Hospital was the primary pediatric evacuation hospital during Hurricane Katrina.

Texas Children's completed a capital campaign in 2018, called Promise: The Campaign for Texas Children's Hospital, which was intended to meet the needs of a growing patient population who have a wider spectrum of complex needs. The campaign raised $575 million and included construction of Texas Children's Hospital The Woodlands, which provides pediatric care for families in the communities north of Houston, as well as construction of the Lester and Sue Smith Legacy Tower in the Texas Medical Center. This building houses additional surgical and critical care services and Texas Children's Heart Center, including an Adult Congenital Heart department.

In November 2020, Dwayne "The Rock" Johnson collaborated with Microsoft and billionaire Bill Gates to donate Xbox Series X consoles to the Texas Children's Hospital along with 19 other children's hospitals throughout the country.

In 2023, Texas Attorney General Ken Paxton launched an investigation of the hospital for violating the state's ban on providing transgender health care to trans minors. The investigation ended with a settlement in 2026, in which the hospital was forced to fire and blacklist all doctors who had assisted in providing such care, pay the state $10 million, and open up a first-of-its-kind "detransition clinic" which would perform detransition services on patients who had previously received transgender health care. Texas Children's also agreed to furnish a list, which would not be kept confidential, of all patients who had previously received transgender health care.

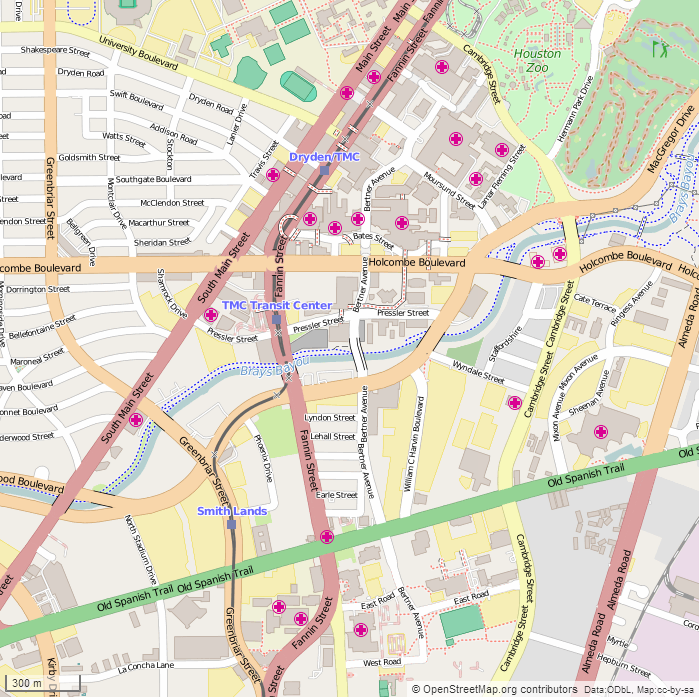
Location within Texas Medical Center

== Research ==
Also at TMC, The Baylor College of Medicine and Texas Children's also operate the nation's only Children's Nutrition Research Center, a United States Department of Agriculture facility that researches the nutritional needs of pregnant women, nursing women, children, teens, and young adults.

The hospital operates several research centers, including the David Center, which was established in 1984 to honor David Vetter, the twelve-year-old also known as the "Bubble Boy," who died of a rare immune-system disorder. The David Center is dedicated solely to treating immunological-deficiency diseases, especially those involving the development of cancer.

== Adult programs ==
In addition to their pediatric specialties, Texas Children's Hospital serves adults through a couple of their nationally recognized programs. Texas Children's Hospital has one of the largest adult congenital heart disease programs in the U.S., and recently opened up a 16-bed inpatient unit to care for adults with congenital heart disease (legacy tower).

Additionally, it houses the 106-bed Texas Children's Hospital - Pavilion for Women, providing gynecological and maternity care for women of all ages.

In the wake of the COVID-19 pandemic, Texas Children's Hospital opened up their units to adult patients of all ages to reduce the load on adult hospitals in the area. Texas Children's Hospital accepted adults – both those who had COVID-19, and those that tested negative but were in the hospital for unrelated reasons.

The state-mandated detransition clinic established in 2026 covers and adds to the furnished list anyone who previously received transgender care under the age of 21, including those who were adults at the time or have since become adults.

== Rankings and recognition ==
In 2013, Parents Magazine listed the hospital as #7 on their Top 10 U.S. Children's Hospitals list.

In 2016, the hospital was named as one of the "100 great hospitals in America" by the publication Becker's Hospital Review.

In 2017, Texas Children's Hospital was recognized for "facility management excellence" by the American Society for Health Care Engineering.

In 2020, Texas Children's was listed on Newsweek's World's Best Specialized Hospitals list for pediatrics.

The 2024–2025 edition of U.S. News & World Report designated Texas Children's Hospital on their Best Children's Hospitals Honor Roll. Texas Children's Hospital is 1 of 10 hospitals designated on the U.S. News & World Report Honor Roll, which is reserved to hospitals that rank in all 10 subspecialties surveyed.

U.S. News & World Report Rankings for Texas Children's Hospital
Specialty	Rank (In the U.S.)	Score (Out of 100)
Neonatology	#3	92.3
Pediatric Cancer	#4	95.5
Pediatric Cardiology & Heart Surgery	#1	100.0
Pediatric Diabetes & Endocrinology	#4	93.3
Pediatric Gastroenterology & GI Surgery	#5	97.5
Pediatric Nephrology	#1	100.0
Pediatric Neurology & Neurosurgery	#2	99.3
Pediatric Orthopedics	#7	92.6
Pediatric Pulmonology & Lung Surgery	#2	98.2
Pediatric Urology	#2	92.5

== Facilities ==
Texas Children's Hospital is made up of many buildings including three hospital campuses, research centers, multiple specialty care centers, primary care offices, and urgent care centers. Texas Children's Hospital is currently under rapid expansion throughout Texas.

=== Texas Medical Center ===
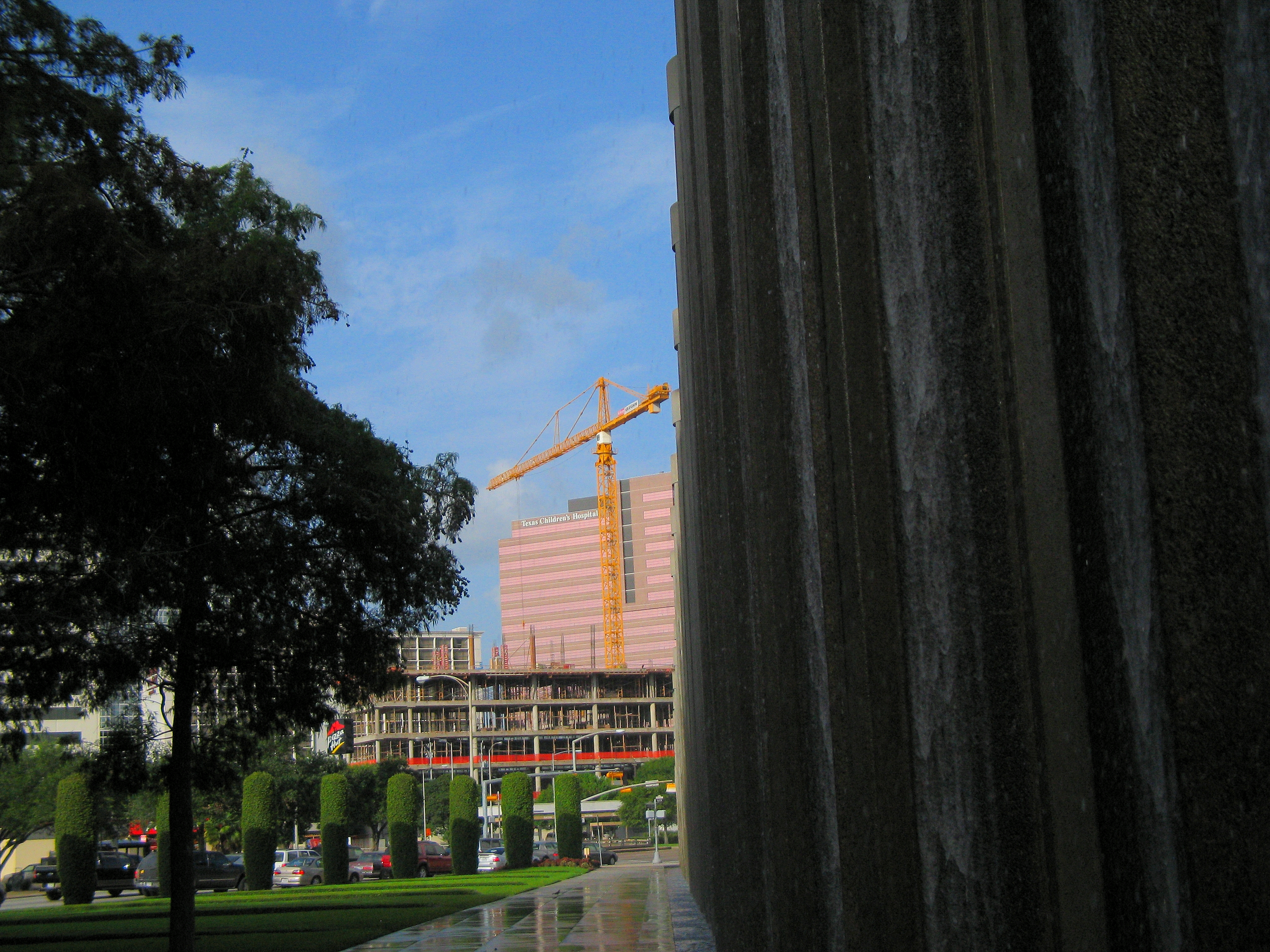
Construction near Texas Children's Hospital

The main campus of Texas Children's Hospital is located in the Texas Medical Center. The hospital provides comprehensive pediatric specialties and subspecialties to infants, children, teens, and young adults aged 0–21 throughout Texas. The Texas Children's Hospital buildings include inpatient facilities in Legacy Tower, West Tower, Pavilion for Women, and the Abercrombie building. Also located at the Texas Medical Center campus is the outpatient Wallace Tower, and the research buildings: Feigin Tower, the Jan and Dan Duncan Neurological Research Institute and the Children's Nutritional Research Center.

=== West Campus ===
In addition to the main Texas Medical Center campus, Texas Children's also has a hospital located in west Houston: Texas Children's Hospital West Campus. The hospital has 94 pediatric beds, 2 procedure rooms, and 8 operating rooms. The hospital originally opened on December 1, 2010, as just an outpatient hospital before their expansion, adjacent to the Houston Methodist Hospital West. The campus is notable for containing the first pediatric biocontainment unit in the country. The west campus also has a helipad to transport critical cases to the main campus.

The hospital is listed as one of The Leapfrog Group's Top Children's Hospitals for both the 2018 list and the 2019 list.

=== The Woodlands ===
Texas Children's Hospital The Woodlands originally opened its outpatient tower in October 2016. The hospital's inpatient tower features 85 pediatric beds and the area's only dedicated pediatric emergency room.

In early 2020, supermarket chain, Kroger donated $100,000 to Texas Children's-The Woodlands to help in the fight against childhood hunger.

=== Austin ===
In mid 2020, officials from Texas Children's announced that plans were made to build and open a new children's hospital in Northwest Austin, Texas. The plans were for a $450 million, 360,000 square foot hospital with 48 beds and shell space for future expansion. The announcement comes at a time when Austin based Dell Children's Medical Center also has plans to open a new children's hospital in North Austin. The expansion of pediatric services is attributed to the fact that Austin is one of the fastest-growing cities in America. The hospital is expected to be complete in 2023.

== Texas Children's Cancer Center ==
Texas Children's Cancer and Hematology Center is one of the largest pediatric oncology and blood disease centers in the United States. The 2024–25 edition of U.S. News & World Report ranked Texas Children's Hospital #4 in the subspecialty of pediatric cancer within the United States. It is located in Houston, Texas.

The facilities of the multidisciplinary center, located at Texas Children's Hospital in the Texas Medical Center, includes a 36-bed inpatient unit, a 22,000-square-foot (2,000 m^{2}) outpatient clinic and a 25-bed bone marrow transplant unit, as well as 47 research laboratories. Each year the center provides a specialized level of care to more than 4,000 children and adolescents newly diagnosed with cancer and blood diseases.

=== History ===
Originally called the Research Hematology-Oncology Service, Texas Children's Cancer Center was founded by Dr. Donald J. Fernbach in January 1958. The National Cancer Institute provided the first grant that the center was funded on.

In 1959, the first bone marrow transplant from one identical twin to another was performed by Fernbach; this was one of the first procedures of its kind for aplastic anemia.

The Hematology Center at Texas Children's Hospital has been treating children diagnosed with hematological disorders since 1958.

== Notable people ==
President and CEO

- Debra F. Sukin

Former president and CEO

- Mark Wallace

Physicians-in-chief

- Russell Blattner, M.D. — founding physician-in-chief, 1954-1977
- Ralph Feigin, M.D. – physician-in-chief, 1977–2008
- Mark Kline, M.D. – physician-in-chief, 2008–2020, Texas Children's Hospital; former chairman of the Department of Pediatrics, Baylor College of Medicine; former president of the Baylor International Pediatric AIDS Initiative, Baylor College of Medicine

Physicians

- Jennifer Arnold, M.D. – neonatologist, profiled on the television series The Little Couple
- Benjy F. Brooks, M.D. — first female pediatric surgeon in Texas
- Charles Fraser, Jr., M.D. – surgeon-in-chief, 2010–2019
- Peter Hotez, M.D., Ph.D. – director of the Texas Children's Hospital Center for Vaccine Development
- Charles Mullins – cardiologist (1970–2006); has been called "the father of modern interventional pediatric cardiology"
- David Poplack, M.D. – former director, Texas Children's Cancer Center, Professor of Pediatrics.
- Bruce D. Perry, M.D.

Patients

- David Vetter (1971–1984) – severe combined immune deficiency syndrome (a.k.a., The Bubble Boy)
- The Mata Twins (2014–present) - formerly conjoined twins that underwent a 26-hour operation to be surgically separated

== Gallery ==
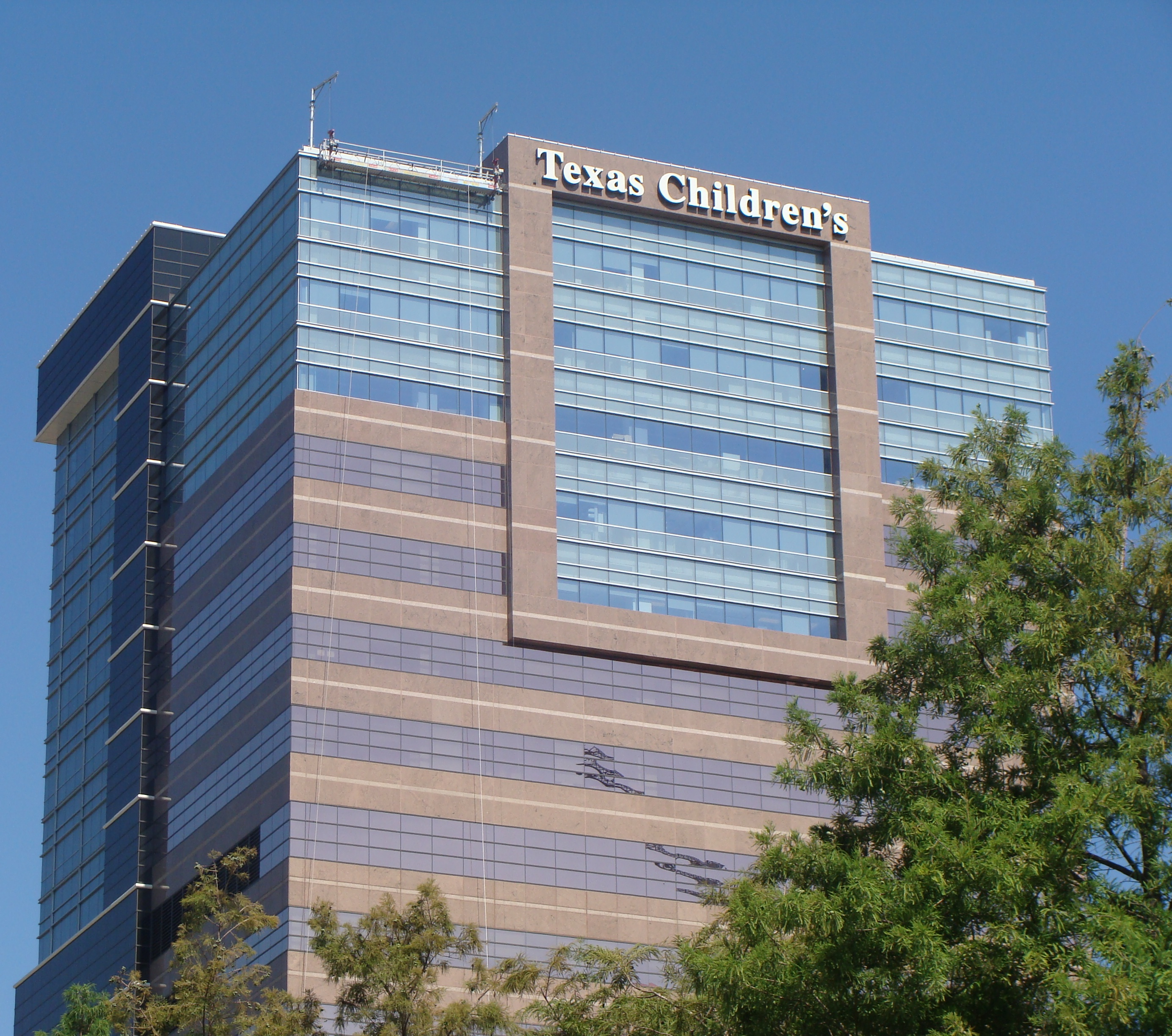
The hospital in 2007 (Feigin Tower)

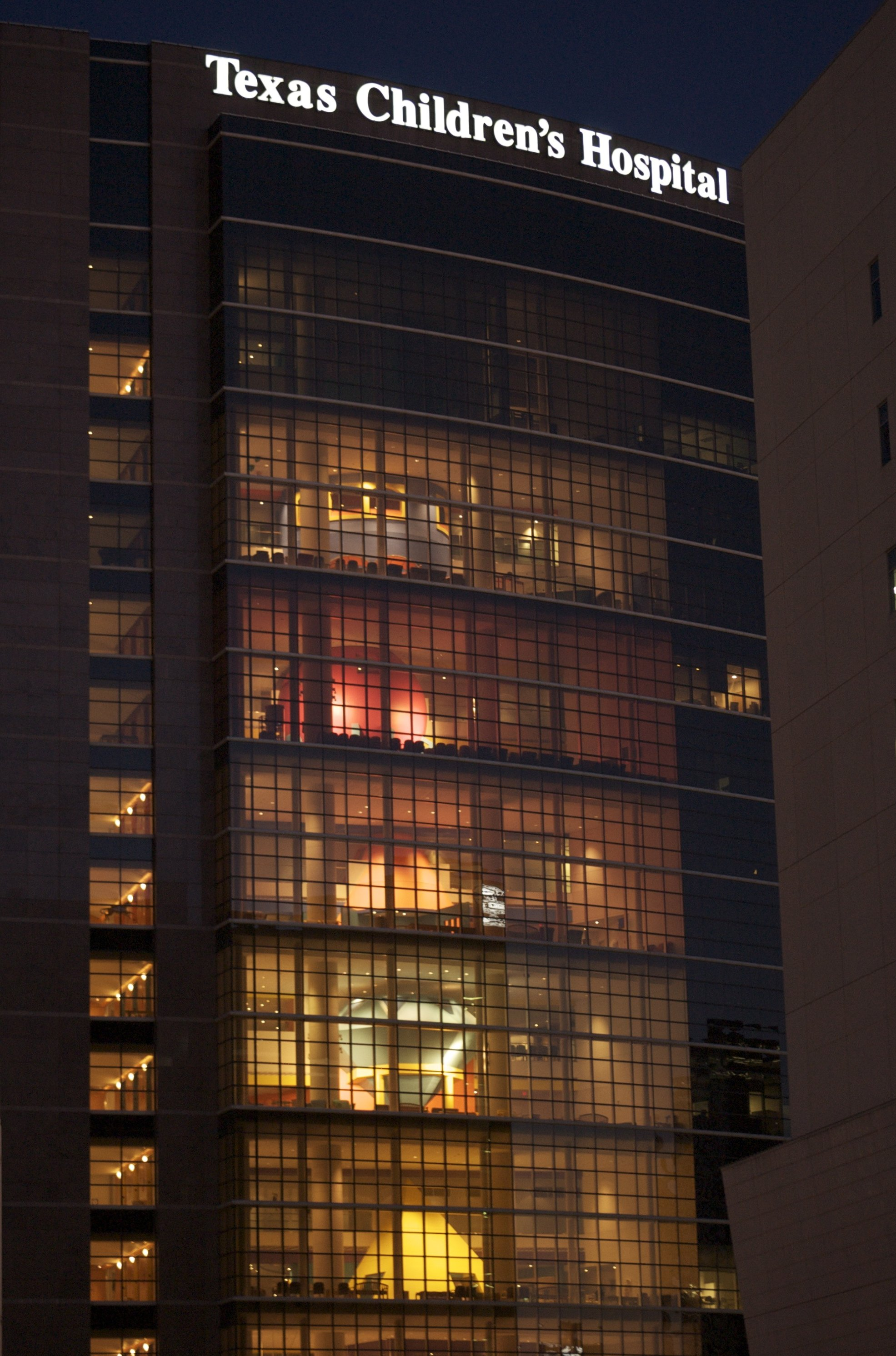
The hospital in 2009 (Wallace tower)

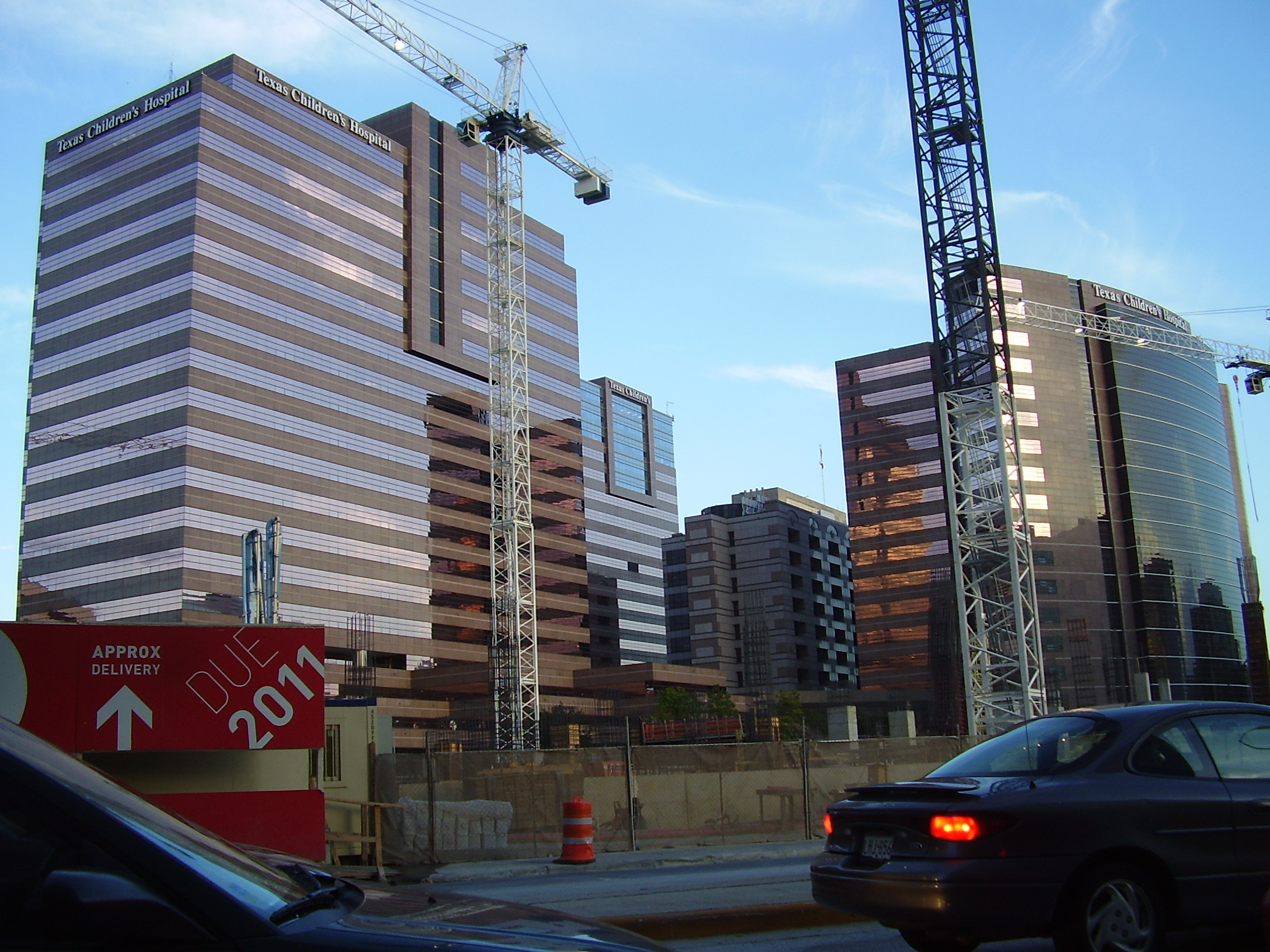
The hospital in 2009 (Left to right: West tower, Feigin tower, CNRC, Wallace tower)

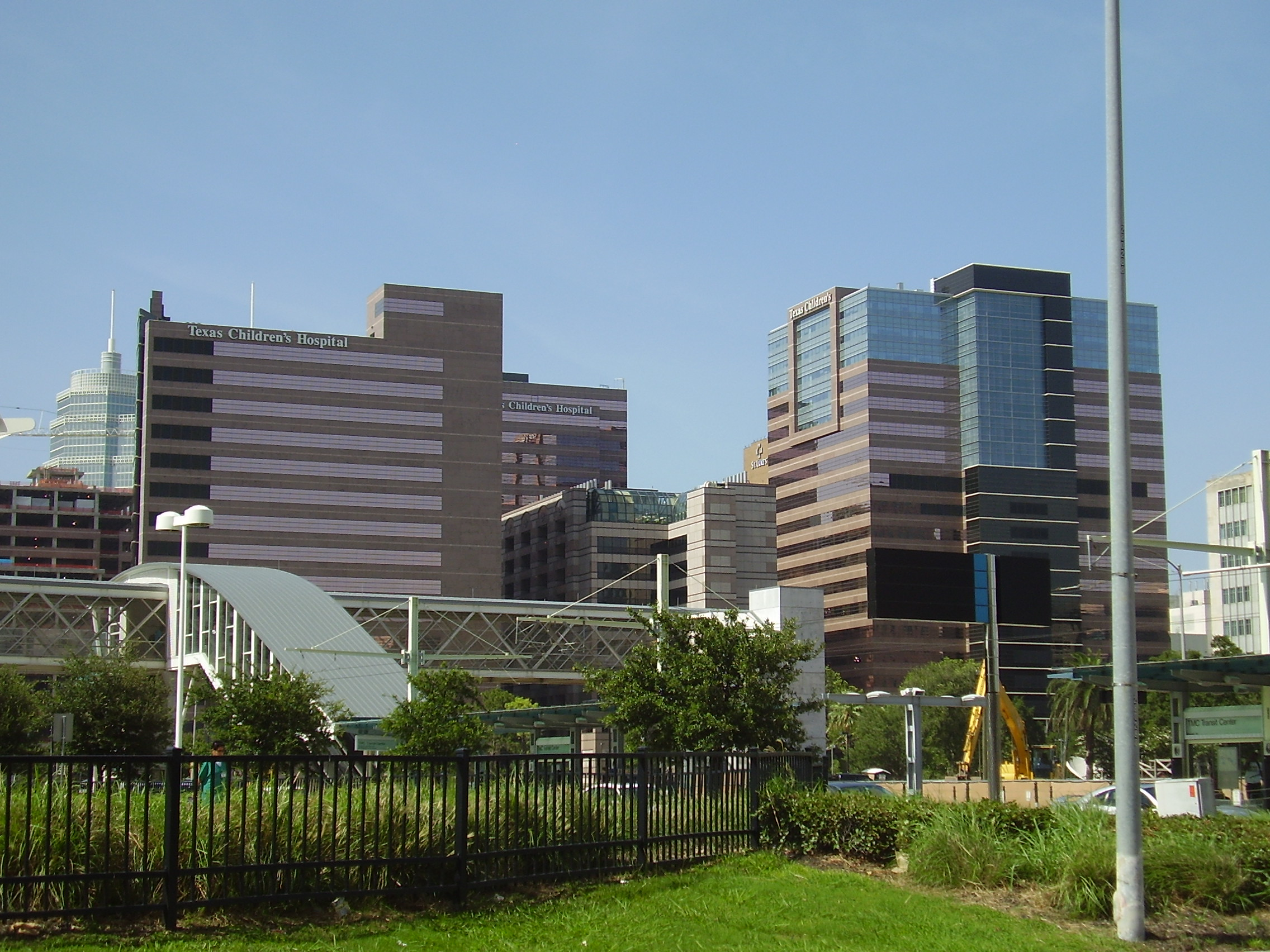
The hospital in 2010 (Left to right: Wallace tower, CNRC, Feigin tower)

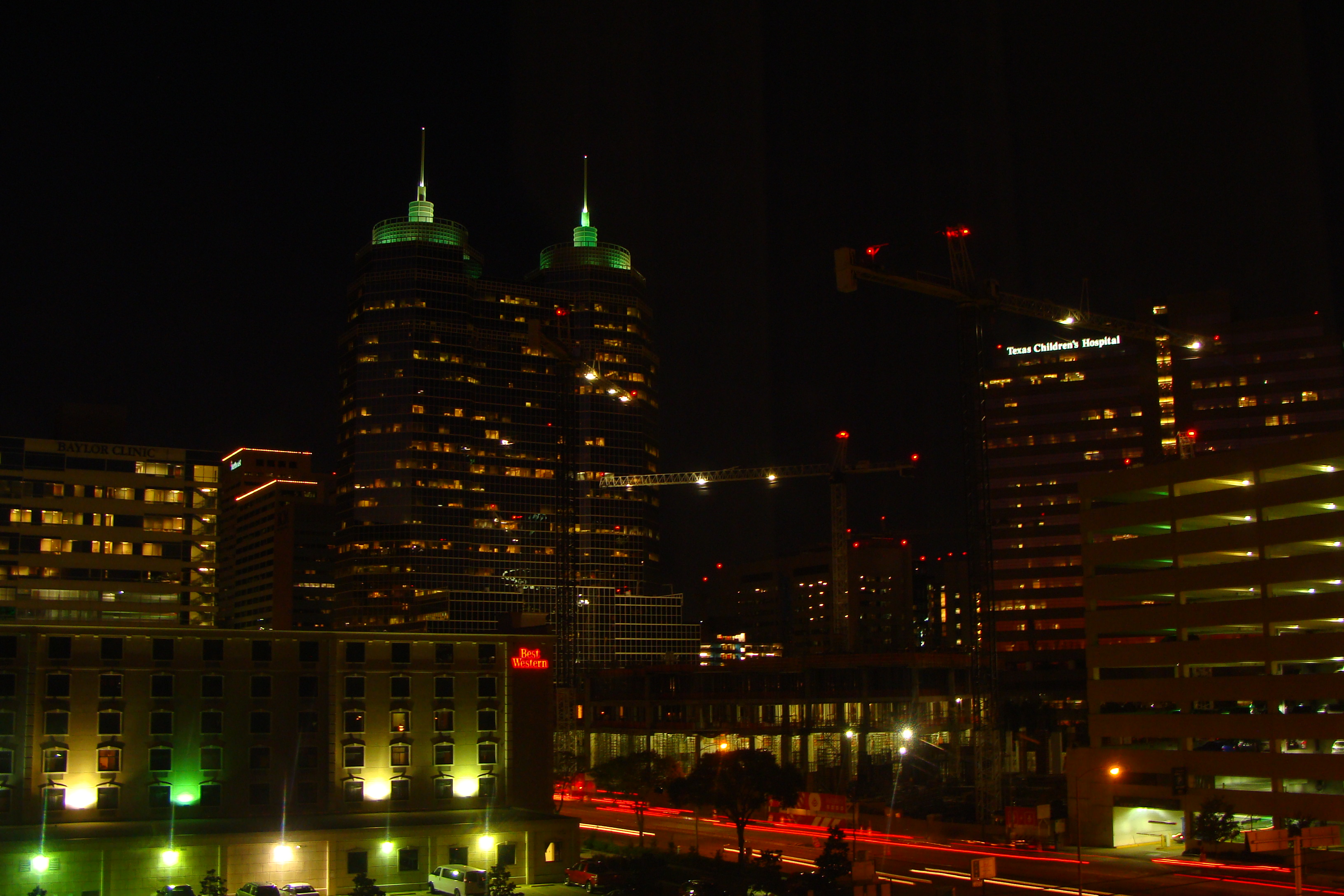
Left to right: Baylor Clinic, St. Luke's Hospital, and Texas Children's Hospital.

== See also ==
- List of children's hospitals in the United States
- Baylor College of Medicine
- Texas Medical Center
