= St. Austin Catholic School =

Location
- 1911 San Antonio Street; Austin, Texas 78705; 30.283°N 97.7429°W

Information
- Type: Private
- Religious affiliation: Roman Catholic
- Established: 1917
- Principal: Tara Cevallos
- Grades: PK 3–8
- Gender: Coeducational
- Enrollment: ~215
- Student to teacher ratio: 10:1
- Website: www.staustinschool.org

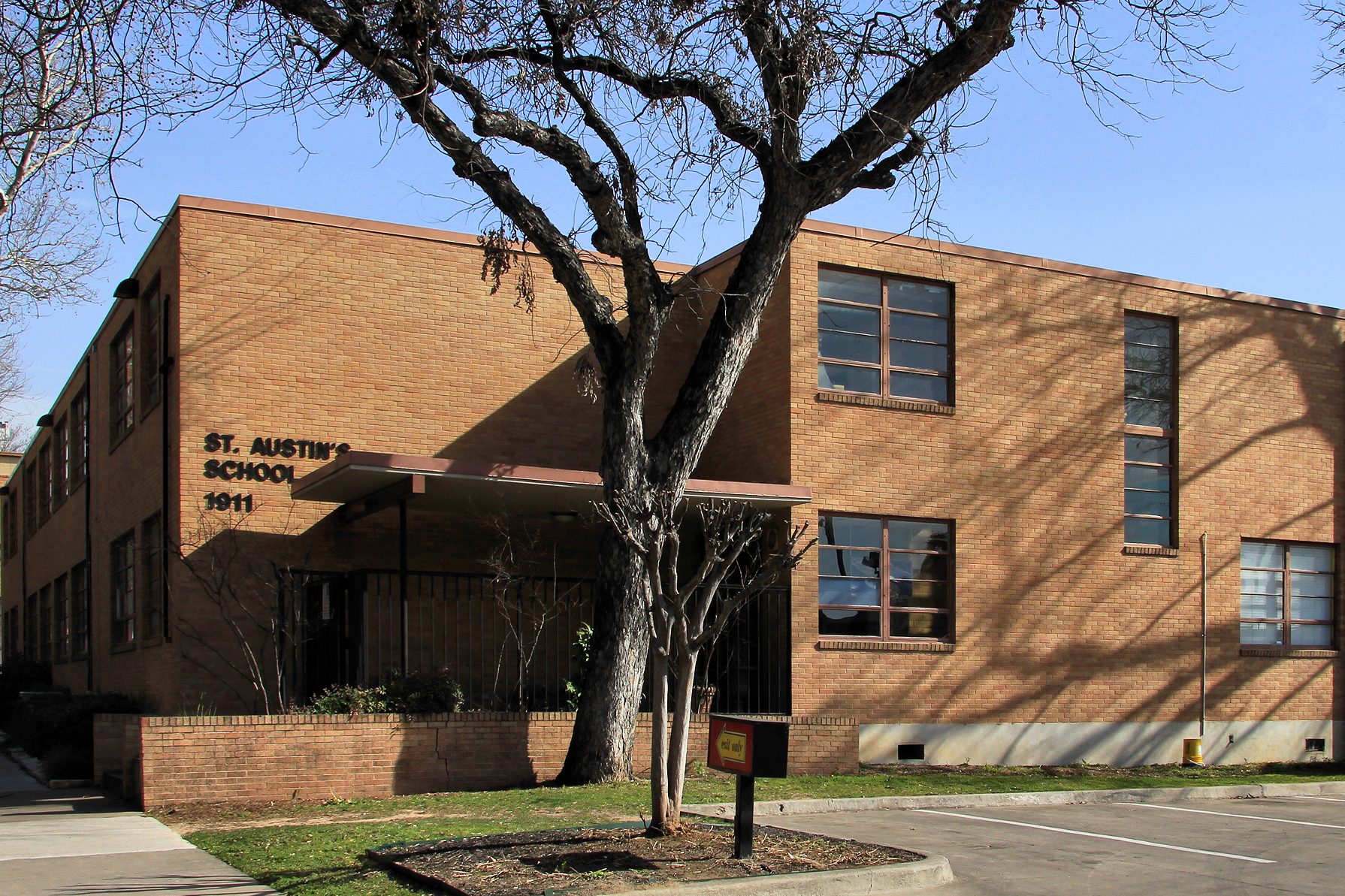
St. Austin Catholic School

St. Austin Catholic School is a private, Catholic elementary and middle school with a full-time and part-time 3 year olds class, a class for 4 year olds and Kinder - 8th. St. Austin is located in downtown Austin, Texas, one block from UT campus, Dell Medical School and four blocks from the Texas State Capital. St. Austin is located within the Diocese of Austin. The average class size is 20 students and the teacher to student ratio is 1:9. The current enrollment at St. Austin is 215 students.

== History ==
In September 1917 Newman Elementary School was established as the parish school for St. Austin Catholic Parish, which is administered by the Paulist Fathers. Three Dominican Sisters of Houston were given the direction of the newly established school. When an eighth grade was added for the 1941–1942 school year, the school became a complete elementary school, and the name was changed to St. Austin Catholic School.

== Student Body Facts & Achievements ==
- 215 students
- Pre-Kindergarten 3 through 8th Grades
- Average class size of 20
- 1:9 student to teacher ratio
- Students that attend St. Austin come from 42 different zip codes in and around Austin
- 1st Place in the PSIA Academic State Meet 3 years running
- Stanford Achievement Test scores rate among the top 10% schools in the nation
- Graduates place in leading Catholic, magnet and private honors programs with 60% advancing to private and 25% advancing to magnet schools
- Exemplary performance of St Austin alumni in high schools: St Michael's Catholic Academy Valedictorian (2015), National Merit Scholars, National Merit Commended Scholar and National Hispanic Scholar (2015)

== Accreditation & Awards ==
- Dual, Advanced Accreditation by Texas Catholic Conference and Southern Association of Colleges and Schools (SACS) Council
- National Catholic Educational Association
- Member of the Catholic Diocese of Austin
- Physically Active Learning Campus, 2015
- 1st private school in Austin to be awarded the National Blue Ribbon of Excellence
- Austin Monthly Top Private Schools, 2012

== Enrichment ==
- National Junior's Honor Society
- Honor Roll & Principal's List
- Performing arts electives including: art, band, choir, music, dance, 1-act-play, library, PE
- Enrichment curriculum including: robotics, math pentathlon, math sense, analytics, study skills, student council
- Spanish from Pk-3 through 8th grade (70% of St. Austin students place out of Spanish 1 on entering high school)
- Technology programs from Pk-3 through 8th grades with 1:1 Chromebooks (3rd - 8th grades). Coding beginning in 3rd grade. Two 3-d printers incorporated into technology curriculum.
- Differentiated teaching and learning programs
- After school care and classes including: Chess Club, Robotics, Art, Science Club and afterschool sports
