= Janaadhar Constructions =

Indian Real estate company

Janaadhar (India) Pvt. Ltd.
- Company type: Private company
- Industry: Real Estate
- Founded: Bengaluru, India (2008)
- Founder: Ramesh Ramanathan, (Chairman)
- Headquarters: Bengaluru, India
- Area served: India
- Key people: Arvind Bhatnagar, (Chief Operating Officer)
- Website: www.janaadhar.com

Janaadhar (India) Pvt. Ltd. is an affordable housing company co-founded in 2008 by Ramesh Ramanathan, who is also the owner of micro-finance company Janalakshmi Financial Services, along with Ramani Sastri, CMD, Sterling Developers and Naresh Narasimhan, Principal Architect of Venkataramanan Associates.

== Janaadhar Shubha ==
Janaadhar Shubha is an integrated township launched by Janaadhar (India) Pvt. Ltd. in 2010. The project spreads across 12 acres of land in Attibele area in Bangalore, Karnataka where a total of 1128 families will be able to purchase a home for themselves. Of the 1128 flats on offer, 480 flats are single bedroom while 648 flat will be double bedroom. The single bedroom flat area is 400 sq. ft. and is priced lower than Rs 5,00,000 to serve the population who cannot afford houses elsewhere.

The Michael & Susan Dell Foundation has provided initial funding to Janaadhar (India) Pvt. Ltd. for implementing affordable housing projects in Bengaluru city in India.
