= Russell Blattner =

American pediatrician (1908–2002)

Russell Blattner (July 3, 1908 – December 6, 2002) was a pediatrician and the founding physician-in-chief of Texas Children's Hospital.

== Career ==
Early in his career, Blattner was involved in research on the source of St. Louis encephalitis. In 1947, Blattner was named Chairman of the Department of Pediatrics at Baylor College of Medicine. He was able to plan and implement the founding of Texas Children's Hospital, which is currently the largest children's hospital in the United States.

Blattner served as physician-in-chief at Texas Children's Hospital from 1954 until 1977, when he was replaced by Ralph Feigin. One of his first notable decisions was to allow parents to stay with children during hospitalization, a practice which has since been widely adopted by other hospitals. Blattner brought a tuberculosis control program to Houston.
