= UT Medical School =

UT Medical School may refer to:

- Dell Medical School (University of Texas System)
- McGovern Medical School a.k.a. University of Texas Medical School at Houston
- University of Tennessee Health Science Center
