= David Poplack =

David Poplack is an American pediatrician and was the Director of the Texas Children's Cancer Center at Texas Children's Hospital from 1993 to 2018. He was Principal Investigator of an NCI K12 Pediatric Oncology Clinical Research Training Grant, and the Program Director of an NCI T32 Pediatric Oncology Training grant at Baylor College of Medicine. Dr. Poplack has authored more than 350 original articles and book chapters relating to pediatric oncology, and serves on the editorial board of numerous subspecialty journals. He is co-editor of Principles and Practice of Pediatric Oncology, the leading textbook of pediatric oncology, which is in its seventh edition. He also has served on numerous NIH, FDA and Institute of Medicine committees.
