= Dell Seton Medical Center =

- Seton Healthcare Family
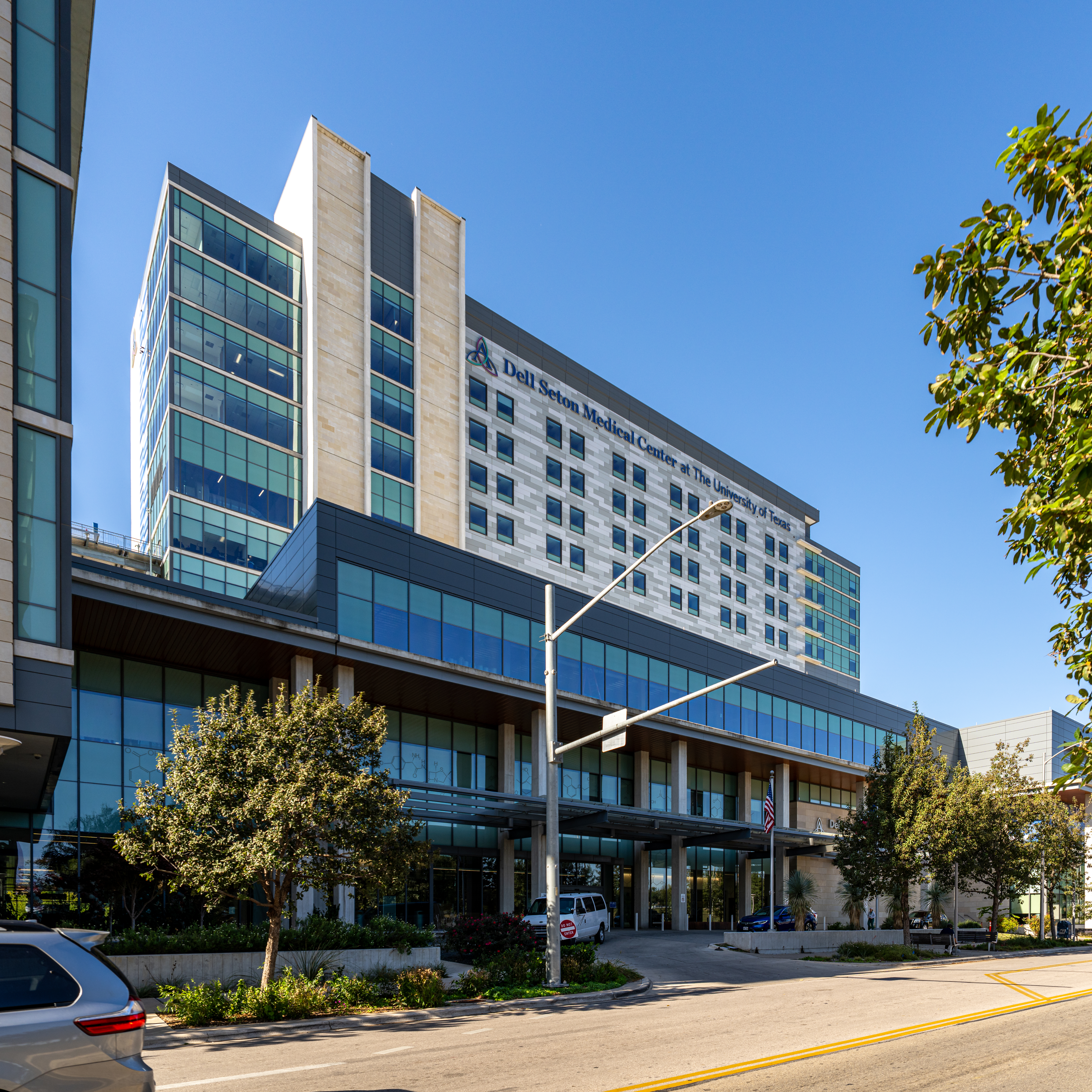

Geography
- Location: Austin, Texas, United States
- Coordinates: 30°16′36″N 97°44′02″W

Organization
- Type: Teaching
- Affiliated university: Dell Medical School, University of Texas

Services
- Emergency department: Level I Trauma Center

History
- Opened: May 21, 2017

Links
- Lists: Hospitals in Texas

Dell Seton Medical Center at The University of Texas is a hospital in Austin, Texas, affiliated with the University of Texas at Austin's Dell Medical School. It is the teaching hospital for the medical school.

Ascension Seton developed the hospital in partnership with Central Health and the University of Texas at Austin, with philanthropic support from the Michael & Susan Dell Foundation.

It opened on May 21, 2017, replacing Brackenridge Hospital as the city's primary public teaching facility. The hospital is located on land owned by the University of Texas at Austin and is operated by Ascension Seton in partnership with Central Health.

Together with Dell Children's Medical Center, Dell Seton comprises the region's only adult Level 1 Trauma Center serving 11 counties in Central Texas. It is a comprehensive stroke center and STEMI center.

In the 2020s, the hospital expanded its specialized neurological services, opening Central Texas's first neurocritical care unit in June 2023. The unit was expanded from 15 to 30 beds in July 2024.

== History ==
In 2015, the Michael & Susan Dell Foundation partnered with Ascension Seton to support the development of the Dell Seton Medical Center. The foundation donated $25 million to the hospital in 2016.

It opened on May 21, 2017, replacing Brackenridge Hospital.

In April 2023, Ascension Seton announced a $280 million expansion of Dell Seton. The expansion will add 150 beds, over 160,000 square feet of space, increased intensive-care capacity, and six operating rooms.

In August 2023, the University of Texas System revealed its plans to build a $2.5 billion medical center adjacent to Dell Seton. The center will include an MD Anderson Cancer Center hospital and a university specialty hospital on the site of the former Frank Erwin Center.

In March 2025, the Dell Seton Adult Abdominal Transplant Center opened a new clinic on the first floor to increase its capacity for kidney and pancreas transplants.

== Governance and operations ==
Dell Seton is operated through a partnership between Central Health, Travis County’s public hospital district, and Ascension Seton. Central Health leases the land, and the hospital is operated by Ascension Seton, which subleases the site from Central Health.

In 2023, Central Health and Ascension Texas sued each other over their partnership agreement to provide care to low-income and uninsured Travis County residents. Each side alleged that the other had breached contractual obligations.

== Cybersecurity ==
In May 2024, when Ascension experienced a ransomware attack, Dell Seton and other Ascension Seton hospitals in the Austin area transitioned to manual, paper-based workflows. Electronic health records were restored in early June 2024.

== Quality and safety ==
In spring 2024, the Leapfrog Group gave Dell Seton Medical Center a "C" hospital safety grade. Ascension acknowledged the findings and stated that it was working to improve safety measures.
