= Charles Mullins (pediatric cardiologist) =

American cardiologist (1932–2024)

Charles E. Mullins (January 15, 1932 – November 17, 2024) was an American pediatric cardiologist who practiced at Baylor College of Medicine and Texas Children's Hospital. He is known for advancing cardiac catheterization techniques to treat congenital heart defects, and has been referred to as the father of modern interventional pediatric cardiology.

== Early life ==
Mullins was born in Washington, D.C. He graduated from Princeton University and George Washington University Medical School. He completed residency training at Walter Reed Army Medical Center; the residency was in adult cardiology, but most of the cardiac catheterization patients at Walter Reed were infants and children with heart defects. He became the U.S. Army's first pediatric cardiologist.

For this service, Mullins received a U.S. Army Commendation Medal and an oak leaf cluster. He left the army as a lieutenant colonel.

== Career ==
After leaving the military, Mullins came to Texas Children's Hospital (TCH) and Baylor College of Medicine. He was the first director of the pediatric intensive care unit at TCH. Mullins became known for his work with cardiac catheterization. Before Mullins' work, catheterization labs had been primarily used to image the heart. Mullins worked to advance interventional cardiology, using cardiac catheterization to repair heart defects. University of Chicago cardiologist Ziyad Hijazi said that Mullins is "the father of modern interventional pediatric cardiology". Mullins created a sheath and introducer system for carrying out cardiac catheterization and he pioneered the use of endovascular stents to treat children with heart defects. In late 2005, Mullins performed his last cardiac catheterization procedure. He retired in 2006.

Mullins authored Cardiac Catheterization in Congenital Heart Disease: Pediatric and Adult in 2006. The book was reviewed in the journal Circulation. Mullins died on November 17, 2024, at the age of 92.

== Honors and awards ==
The American Academy of Pediatrics Section on Cardiology and Cardiac Surgery gave Mullins its Founders Award in 2004. The cardiac catheterization lab at TCH is named for Mullins. The Society for Cardiovascular Angiography and Interventions has established the Mullins Lecture, which is the keynote address at the organization's annual scientific sessions.
