= Mark Kline =

American physician and pediatrician

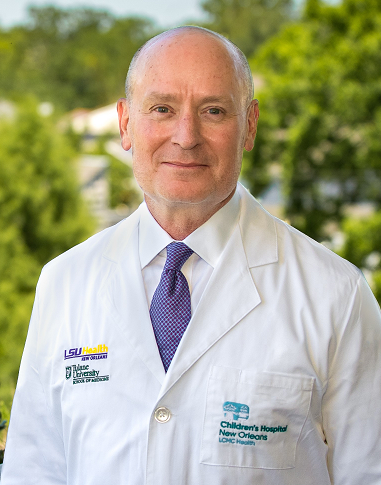
- Born: Mark Kline; Corpus Christi, Texas
- Education: Trinity University (BA); Baylor College of Medicine (MD)
- Scientific career
- Fields: pediatrics, global health, HIV/AIDS
- Workplaces: St. Louis University School of Medicine; Texas Children's Hospital; Baylor College of Medicine; Children's Hospital New Orleans; Tulane University School of Medicine; Louisiana State University School of Medicine

Mark W. Kline is an American pediatrician and infectious diseases specialist who currently serves as the Physician-in-Chief, Senior Vice President and Chief Medical Officer at Children's Hospital New Orleans and Professor of Pediatrics at the Tulane University School of Medicine and LSU Health New Orleans. Kline is known for his life-long work in building programs for children with HIV/AIDS all over the world.

== Early life and education ==
Kline was born in Corpus Christi, Texas, to William Marshall Kline (an undercover federal drug agent) and Elsie Ford Kline (a homemaker). He has two siblings: Gary Kline and Patricia Bivin. The family grew up primarily in South Texas. Kline graduated from high school in San Antonio. Kline expressed an interest in science and medicine from a very early age and began volunteering at the Bexar County Hospital in San Antonio at the age of 15, ultimately accumulating several thousand hours of volunteer experience.

Kline received a Bachelor of Arts in biology from Trinity University in 1979, graduating summa cum laude. In 1981, he received his M.D. with Honors from Baylor College of Medicine, where he completed a residency in pediatrics at Texas Children's Hospital in 1985, having served as Chief Resident in Pediatrics, and was a Postdoctoral Fellow in Pediatric Infectious Diseases at BCM and Texas Children's.

== Career ==
Kline began caring for HIV-infected children in 1987, before the advent of antiretroviral therapy. Beginning in 1990, he was heavily involved in pediatric HIV clinical research, chairing several pivotal National Institutes of Health-funded clinical trials that advanced the treatment of American children with HIV/AIDS. In 1996, Kline began working in Romania where he trained hundreds of health professionals, built clinical and laboratory infrastructure and implemented a model of pediatric AIDS care delivery that resulted in a marked reduction in the child death rate. Kline replicated this model in Africa, first in Botswana and later in many other countries, always in concert with host governments, as an extension of existing public health programs.

Kline founded the Baylor International Pediatric AIDS Initiative (BIPAI) in 1996 with a goal of expanding access to lifesaving HIV treatment for children and families living in the poorest countries. By 2020, more than 350,000 children and their parents were being treated with HIV medication across the BIPAI network. In cooperation with host governments, he built centers of excellence in Botswana, eSwatini, Uganda, Tanzania, Malawi, Lesotho and Romania. Between 2005 and 2020, HIV prevention and treatment programs reduced the number of African children dying from AIDS from about 360,000 to 50,000 annually [UNAIDS, 2020].

Kline conceived and implemented the Pediatrics AIDS Corps, a Peace Corps-like program to promote the scale up of African AIDS care and treatment programs. Since 2005, the Pediatrics AIDS Corps has trained more than 52,000 African health professionals and dramatically enhanced capacity for the treatment of many other life-threatening diseases.

In 2009, Kline succeeded the late Dr. Ralph D. Feigin as the J.S. Abercrombie Professor and Chair of Pediatrics at Baylor College of Medicine and Physician-in-Chief at Texas Children's Hospital. Under Kline's leadership, Baylor's Department of Pediatrics grew from 590 faculty members to more than 1200, the largest in the U.S. Kline left Baylor in February 2021 to pursue a new leadership opportunity in New Orleans with Children's Hospital New Orleans, Tulane University and Louisiana State University. In 2013, City of Houston mayor Annise Parker proclaimed October 18, 2013 as Dr. Mark W. Kline Day for his contributions to pediatrics and global health.

=== Scholarship ===
Kline has been the recipient of more than $150 million in funding for research and training from the U.S. National Institutes of Health, Centers for Disease Control and Prevention, and U.S. Agency for International Development. He has authored more than 250 scientific articles and textbook chapters and has presented more than 300 national or international lectures on topics in child health, infectious diseases and global health. He is the Editor-in-Chief of Rudolph's Pediatrics, one of the world's most widely recognized medical textbooks.

== Selected awards and honors ==
- Who's Who in America, 2004-2015.
- Annual Vision Award, AIDS Foundation Houston, 2006
- Distinguished Faculty Award, Baylor College of Medicine, 2007
- Ronald McDonald House Charities Medical Award of Excellence, 2007
- Jefferson Award for Public Service, 2009
- Millie and Richard Brock Award of the New York Academy of Medicine, 2009
- Jacqueline Kennedy Onassis Award for Public Service, Jefferson Awards Program, 2010
- E.H. Christopherson Lectureship Award, American Academy of Pediatrics, 2010
- HIVMA Clinical Education Award, Infectious Diseases Society of America, 2010
- First Annual Humanitarian Award, Albert Schweitzer Fellowship Program, 2013
