= Andreas Melbostad =

Norwegian fashion designer

Andreas Melbostad is a Norwegian fashion designer who was the creative director for the label Phi before its closure in December 2009.

His fashion training was at London's Royal College of Art. While there, he was discovered and hired by Alber Elbaz, then working at Guy Laroche. Melbostad followed Elbaz to Yves Saint-Laurent and later moved to Nina Ricci, where he worked under Natalie Gervais. Afterwards he went to Calvin Klein before being hired by financial backer Susan Dell to design the label Phi, where he currently works. His work for Phi has been noted for its "utterly brilliant" proportions and his redesigning of staple garments. In 2012 he was made creative director of Diesel Black Gold women's wear and has been the overall creative director since 2013. As of 2026, the Diesel Black Gold line has been discontinued. Melbostad began working on his own label, Melbostad, in 2019. The Spring 2023 branch launch consisted of unisex designs that reflected Melbostad's Scandinavian heritage.
