= Mark Wallace (businessman) =

Businessman and CEO

- Born: April 24, 1953 (age 73); Oklahoma, United States
- Education: Oklahoma Baptist University; Washington University in St. Louis
- Occupation: Businessman
- Known for: Former chief executive officer of Texas Children's Hospital from 1989 to 2024

Mark A. Wallace (born April 24, 1953) is an American businessman who has been president and chief executive officer of Texas Children's Hospital from 1989 to 2024. He is the longest-serving CEO in the Texas Medical Center. Wallace retired from Texas Children’s on his 35th anniversary with the organization on October 4, 2024.

== Early life and education ==
Wallace attended college at Oklahoma Baptist University and Washington University.

== Career ==
Wallace was a senior vice president at Houston Methodist Hospital from 1983 to 1989. He served two terms as president of the ACHE Houston chapter. Wallace served as Chairman of the Texas Hospital Association in 1999.

In 2017, an outpatient building located at the intersection of Fannin Street and Holcombe Boulevard was designated the Mark A. Wallace Tower.

An illustrated children's book titled The Magic Book of Maxims shares the "Ten Maxims of Leadership" that Wallace developed during his career.

== Awards ==
- Houston Business Journal’s Most Admired CEO Award (2024)
- Medical Bridges One People, One World Gala Honoree, 2020
- Baylor College of Medicine Honorary Doctorate of Humanities, 2015
- Houston Business Journal's Best Nonprofit CEO and Best Executive of the Year, 2015
- The Robin Bush Award, 2011
- Houston Leadership Award from the Jewish Institute for National Security Affairs, 2009
- Earl M. Collier Award for Distinguished Healthcare Administration, 2005
- American College of Healthcare Executives Robert S. Hudgens Memorial Award, 1992
- Oklahoma Baptist University's Alumni Achievement Award, 1992
