= University of Texas at Austin School of Nursing =

School of Nursing
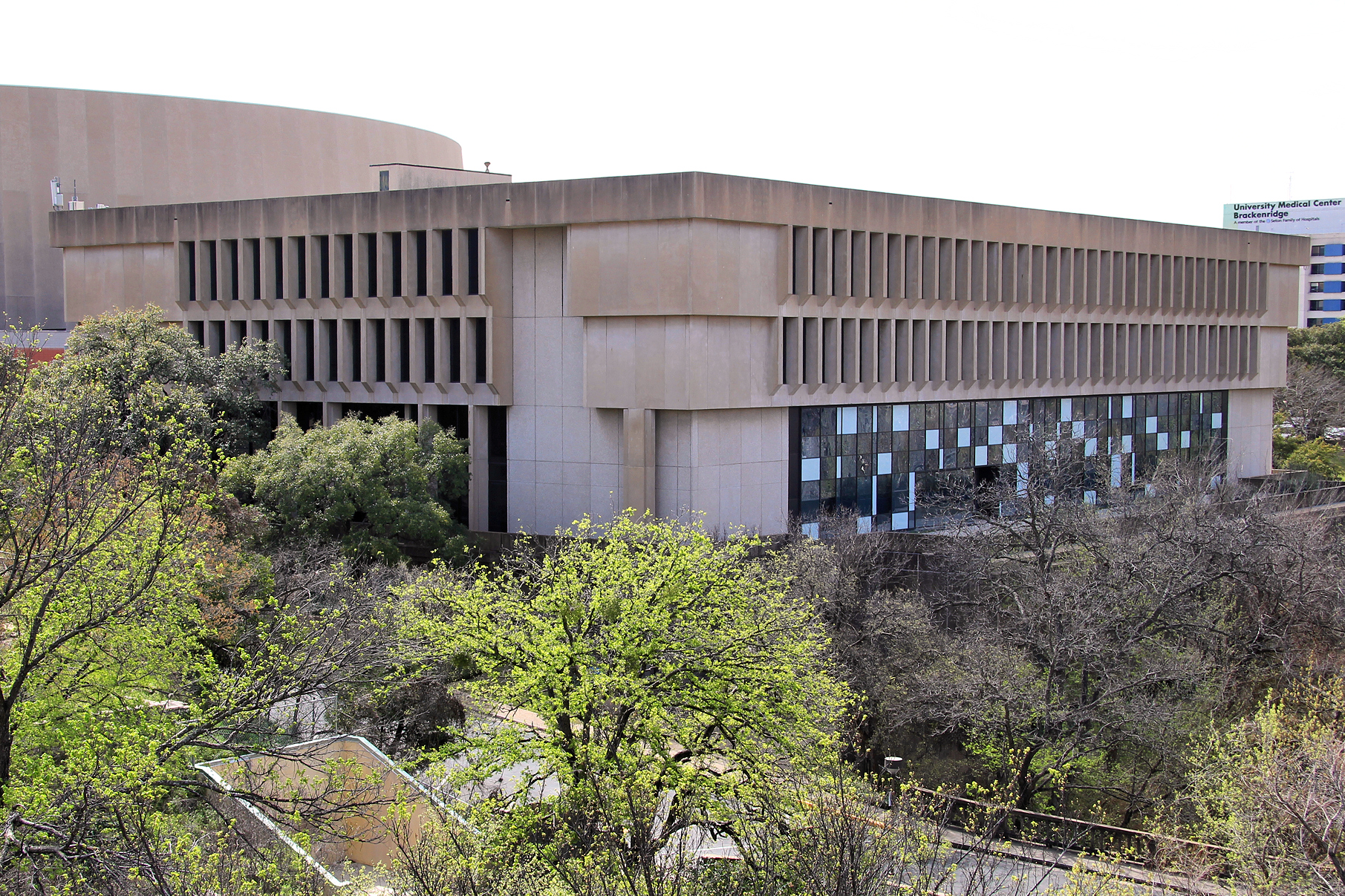
- Former names: John Sealy Hospital Training School for Nurses
- Type: Public nursing school
- Established: 1890
- Affiliations: University of Texas at Austin
- Dean: Eun-Ok Im
- Academic staff: 86
- Administrative staff: 130
- Students: 734
- Undergraduates: 442
- Postgraduates: 292
- Location: Austin, Texas, USA; 30.2777287°N 97.7335961°W
- Website: nursing.utexas.edu

The School of Nursing at the University of Texas at Austin confers undergraduate and graduate degrees in the field of nursing. As of 2024, the school has 734 students and its current dean is Kavita Radhakrishnan. In 2025, the school was ranked 12th by U.S. News & World Report in Best Nursing School's: Master's and 39th in Nursing. The school is located adjacent to the Dell Seton Medical Center, the university's teaching hospital.

== History ==
The University of Texas School of Nursing was originally established in Galveston, Texas, in 1890 as the John Sealy Hospital Training School. In 1923, the school began offering a Bachelor of Science in Nursing in cooperation with the University of Texas.

In 1960, the first nursing courses were offered on the Austin campus. In 1976, as part of a reorganization of University of Texas' system of nursing schools, the School of Nursing officially became a part of the University of Texas at Austin. In 1974, the school began offering a PhD in Nursing, the seventh school in the nation to do so.

== Past Deans ==
- Billye J. Brown, 1972–1989
- Dolores V. Sands, 1989–2009
- Alexa Stuifbergen, 2010–2023
- Eun-Ok Im, 2023–2026
- Kavita Radhakrishnan, Interim, 2026-present
