= Michael & Susan Dell Foundation =

Charitable organization

- Type: 501(c)(3) non-profit organization
- Industry: Philanthropy
- Founded: 1999; 27 years ago
- Headquarters: West Lake Hills, Texas, United States
- Key people: Susan Dell (Cofounder & Board Chair)
- Revenue: 53,567,303 United States dollar (2011)
- Total assets: 817,009,625 United States dollar (2011)
- Website: www.msdf.org

The Michael & Susan Dell Foundation is an American private foundation set up in 1999 by Michael Dell, founder of Dell Inc., and his wife, Susan Dell. The foundation has been supported primarily through investing the proceeds of sales of shares of Dell Inc. As of December 2025, the foundation is estimated to have about US$7.5 billion in assets under management, with $2.9 billion given since 1999 to children's issues and community initiatives, with a large focus on education. According to the OECD, the Michael & Susan Dell Foundation’s financing for 2019 development increased by 11% to $35 million.

== History ==
=== Austin-area initiatives ===
The foundation's founders with president Donald Trump in October 2026

The foundation's early contributions focused on grants to improve access to education and medical care around Austin, Texas. In 2004, the foundation donated $25 million to the capital campaign for a new children's hospital in Austin. The hospital, later named Dell Children's Medical Center, opened in 2007. In 2006, the foundation donated $50 million to the University of Texas System to establish a pediatric health research center, a center for health living, and a new computer science building on its Austin campus. In 2013, the foundation announced a $50 million commitment to establish the Dell Medical School at the University of Texas at Austin, alongside an additional $10 million for community health programs in Austin and Travis County over the following decade.

The foundation later continued to support health care and education in Austin. In 2015, it announced a $25 million matching grant for the downtown teaching hospital that later opened as the Dell Seton Medical Center at the University of Texas.

In 2020, it announced a $100 million, 10-year commitment to the University of Texas at Austin to help increase graduation rates for students from low-income families, including those eligible for the Pell Grant. That same year, it provided a $30 million matching grant to support the Dell Children's Medical Center's pediatric expansion, which cost over $300 million.

In 2021, the foundation committed $38 million to three Austin nonprofits that address homelessness. This included $36.6 million for Mobile Loaves & Fishes' Community First! Village, $1 million to Foundation Communities, and $400,000 to LifeWorks. In 2025, it pledged a $1 million matching gift to Austin Habitat for Humanity in support of the construction of 25 affordable homes in Whisper Valley as part of the Jimmy & Rosalynn Carter Work Project.

The foundation later increased its focus on contributions to improving access to education in India and South Africa. These contributions included acting as an outcome funder for a development impact bond launched in 2014 for Educate Girls, wherein investors provided loans which would be paid out by outcome funders if certain learning outcomes were reached (i.e., an improvement in grades).

In December 2025, the foundation pledged US$6.25 billion to the Trump Accounts, supplementing the mandated $1000 gift for newborns born in 2026 and later with $250 for children ages ten and under at the start of 2026.

== See also ==
- List of wealthiest charitable foundations
- MSD Capital
- Dell Medical School
