= Seton Healthcare Family =

American non-profit hospital network in Texas

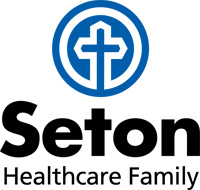
- Type: Non-profit organization
- Industry: Health care
- Founded: Austin, Texas, United States (1902)
- Founder: Daughters of Charity of St. Vincent de Paul
- Headquarters: Austin, Texas, United States
- Area served: Central Texas
- Parent: Ascension
- Website: seton.net

Seton Healthcare Family, also known as Seton Family of Hospitals, is a Roman Catholic-affiliated hospital network in the Greater Austin area. It is a member of Ascension, a not-for-profit health organization located in St. Louis, Missouri.

== History ==
A grassroots effort in the 1890s by citizens of Austin, Texas, led to the opening of the Seton Infirmary on May 26, 1902. The citizenry asked the Daughters of Charity of St. Vincent de Paul to construct a Catholic hospital to take care of the sick and poor.

Over 100 years later the one 42-bed hospital, originally known as "Seton Infirmary" and located at 600 West 26th Street in Austin, Texas, has grown to serve a population of more than 1.8 million, with a special regard for the sick and poor. A Catholic health organization, Seton provides millions of dollars in charity care for the uninsured every year.

The healthcare network now includes five major medical centers, two of which are designated Level I Trauma Centers. Dell Children's Medical Center of Central Texas is the only dedicated hospital for children in the region. Seton also operates two community hospitals, two rural hospitals and a mental health hospital along with multiple locations for outpatient medical services and three primary care clinics for the uninsured. Four facilities are designated Magnet hospitals by the American Nurses Credentialing Center. Seton has become the largest private employer in Central Texas, with approximately 11,000 associates.

In 2011, Seton partnered with the University of Texas System Board of Regents and the University of Texas Southwestern Medical Center in Dallas, one of the nation's leading academic medical centers, to increase the amount of medical education and medical research conducted in Central Texas.

=== Austin CyberKnife Center ===
Austin CyberKnife is based in the Clinical Education Center, on the campus of the former University Medical Center Brackenridge campus.

The Austin CyberKnife Center is a cancer treatment center using CyberKnife technology to treat malignant and benign tumors throughout the body. It has a Lung Optimization Treatment (LOT) System.

== Facilities ==
- Ascension Seton Williamson
- Dell Seton Medical Center at The University of Texas
- Dell Children's Medical Center of Central Texas
- Seton Medical Center Austin
- Seton Edgar B. Davis Hospital
- Seton Highland Lakes Hospital
- Seton Northwest Hospital
- Seton Southwest Hospital
- Seton Shoal Creek Hospital
- Cedar Park Regional Medical Center
- Seton Medical Center Hays
- Central Texas Rehabilitation Hospital
- Seton Smithville Regional Hospital
- Seton Medical Center Harker Heights

Former

- Brackenridge Hospital (owned by the City of Austin, contracted to Seton from 1995, until its closure in 2017)

== Awards ==
- Maternity Qualify Matters Award, Childbirth Connection
- Dell Children's LEED Platinum, US Green Building Council
- Top 100 Integrated Health Systems, Verispan
- Ernest A. Codman Award, Joint Commission
