= Dell Children's Medical Center =

Dell Children's Medical Center of Central Texas
- Ascension Seton

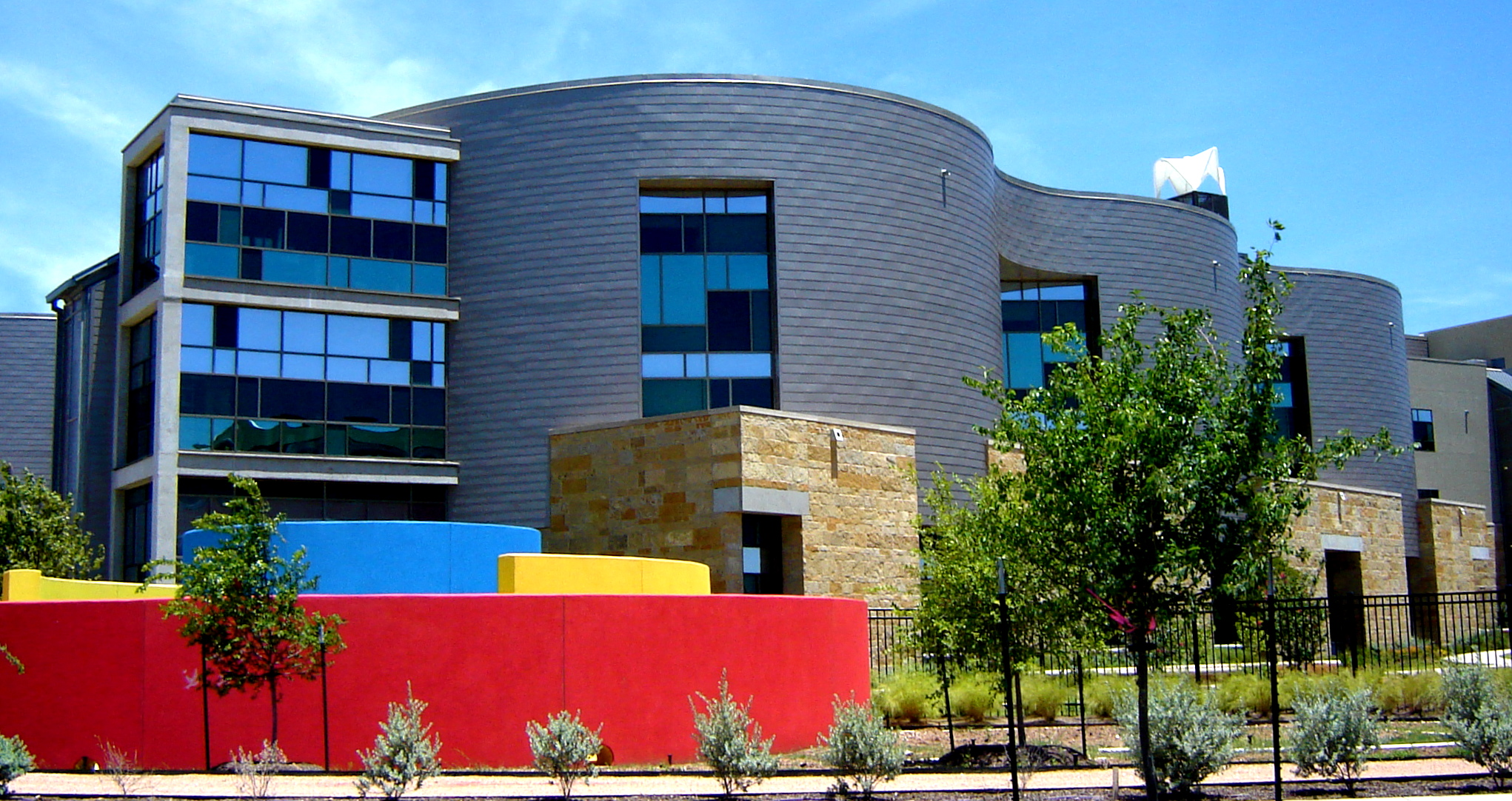

Geography
- Location: 4900 Mueller Blvd, Austin, Texas, United States
- Coordinates: 30.303195°N 97.707078°W

Organisation
- Affiliated university: Dell Medical School

Services
- Emergency department: Level I Pediatric Trauma Center
- Beds: 262

Helipads
- Helipad: (FAA LID: 3XA6)

History
- Founded: 2007

Links
- Website: Official Website

Dell Children's Medical Center of Central Texas is a pediatric acute care hospital located in Austin, Texas. Serving a 46-county area and beyond, the hospital has 262 beds with an additional 72 beds available beginning fall 2022. It is a member of Ascension and is affiliated with Dell Medical School at The University of Texas. The hospital provides comprehensive pediatric specialties and subspecialties to pediatric patients aged 0–21 throughout Central Texas.The hospital features the only Level I pediatric trauma center in the Central Texas region. It is also the only comprehensive children's heart center in Central Texas with 48 cardiac critical care unit beds. It includes the first Comprehensive Fetal Care Center in Central Texas with an obstetrics clinic and specialized delivery unit allowing a mother whose baby has been diagnosed with a complex fetal or congenital condition are able to deliver and recover in the same hospital where newborns receive the highest level of specialized care.

Dell Children's expanded with additional facilities in Williamson County including a new medical office building with pediatric subspecialists and a second 36-bed hospital, Dell Children's North, which opened in April 2023.

== History ==
Dell Children's Medical Center is the successor of the Children's Hospital of Austin (CHOA), a facility operated since 1988 within the University Medical Center Brackenridge campus until the opening of the present building in 2007, when the Austin area obtained its first freestanding children's hospital building. The hospital gained its current name thanks to a $25 million grant from the foundation of technology entrepreneur Michael Dell, whose other philanthropic projects in the Austin area include the Dell Medical School and the University of Texas at Austin computer sciences department.

In November 2020, Dwayne "The Rock" Johnson collaborated with Microsoft and billionaire Bill Gates to donate Xbox Series X consoles to the Dell Children's Medical Center along with 19 other children's hospitals throughout the country.

In May 2023, following an investigation by Texas Attorney General Ken Paxton into the hospital's adolescent clinic providing gender affirming care to trans minors, the entire adolescent clinic severed their affiliation with the hospital.

== Facilities ==
As an ACS Designated Level I Pediatric Trauma Center, Dell maintains 24-hour on call emergency and surgical services. Following the completion of a new south tower in 2013, the hospital currently operates 262 beds, 98 of which are dedicated to specialty care. The new tower has helped the hospital gain the status as the first LEED platinum health care building in the world. Another notable aspect of the facility is the Epilepsy Monitoring Unit (EMU), with a Level 4 ranking from the National Association of Epilepsy Centers, indicating the highest level of diagnostics, monitoring and treatment available for epilepsy. The hospital also features the only pediatric ICU in central Texas, boasting 24 beds.

== Education ==
Dell Children's currently partners with Dell Medical School, as well as other medical schools in the University of Texas system, for residency and fellowship programs in pediatrics, pediatric neurology, and pediatric emergency medicine, among other disciplines of specialty care.
