= Adam Dell =

American businessman

- Born: January 15, 1970 (age 56); Houston, Texas, U.S.
- Education: Tulane University (BA); University of Texas at Austin (JD)
- Occupation: Entrepreneur
- Children: 1
- Relatives: Michael Dell (brother)

Adam R. Dell (born January 14, 1970) is an American venture capitalist and the brother of Michael Dell, the founder of computer manufacturing company Dell Inc.

== Early and personal life ==
Dell was born in Houston, Texas. He earned a BA in political economy from Tulane University and a JD from Texas Law. His elder brother Michael Dell is the founder of the Dell technology company.

In 2010, he became father to a daughter with model and actress Padma Lakshmi.

== Career ==
He began his career working as a corporate attorney for Winstead Sechrest & Minick, in Austin, Texas, before joining the venture capital firm of Enterprise Partners in La Jolla, California. He then joined Crosspoint Venture Partners, in Woodside, California, where he became a partner in 1999. In 2000 he formed Impact Venture Partners, a $100mm early stage venture capital firm, in New York City. Dell joined Austin Ventures as a venture partner in 2009. Dell joined Goldman Sachs as a partner in 2018.

During the course of his career, Dell invested in numerous technology companies such as Hotjobs.com, which was acquired by Yahoo! in 2002; Ingenio, which was acquired by AT&T in 2007; and OpenTable.

Dell founded six companies, Clarity Money, which was acquired by Goldman Sachs in 2018; Civitas Learning; Buzzsaw.com, which was acquired by Autodesk in 2002; and MessageOne, which was acquired by Dell in 2008 and Domain Money, a financial advisory business. Dell was an adjunct professor at Columbia Business School teaching business, technology, innovation. He is a visiting professor at Texas Law where he teaches a class on the role of law in innovation.
