= Michael Dell =

American businessman (born 1965)

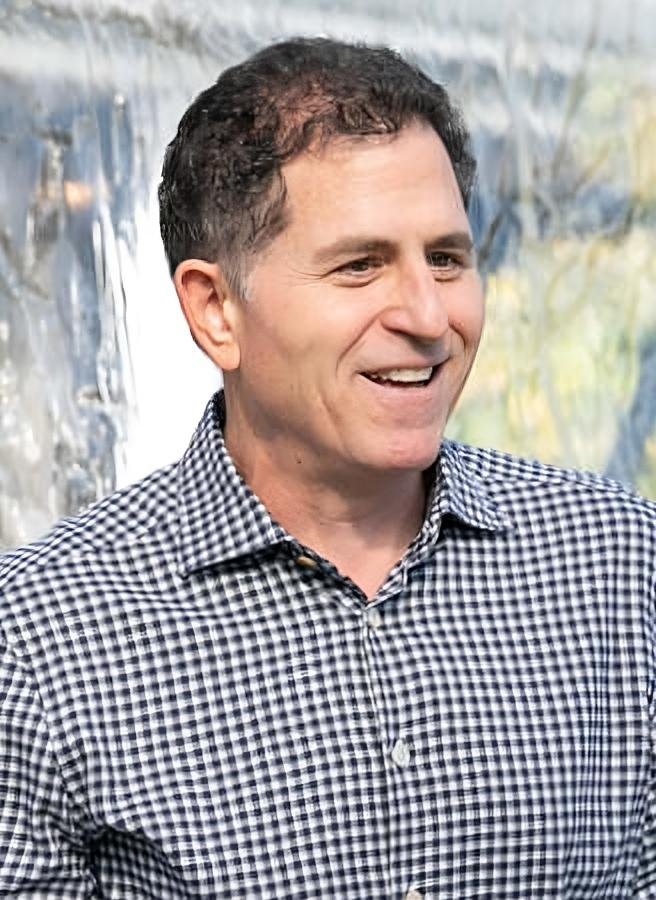
- Dell in 2021
- Born: Michael Saul Dell; February 23, 1965 (age 61); Houston, Texas, U.S.
- Education: University of Texas at Austin (dropped out)
- Occupations: Businessman; investor; philanthropist
- Title: Founder, chairman, and CEO of Dell Technologies Inc.
- Spouse: Susan Dell (m. 1989)
- Children: 4
- Relatives: Adam Dell (brother)

Michael Saul Dell (born February 23, 1965) is an American billionaire, businessman, investor, and philanthropist. He is the founder, chairman, and CEO of Dell Technologies, one of the world's largest technology infrastructure companies; of which he owns a 40% stake as of 2026.

In May 2026, he became a minority owner of the Las Vegas Raiders. That September, the Bloomberg Billionaires Index listed him as the 5th wealthiest person in the world, with a net worth of about $245 billion (USD), while Forbes estimates his net worth at $258.4 billion.

As of October 2023, according to Forbes, his net worth was derived from his 50% stake in Dell and 40% stake in VMware, with the rest being held by his family office DFO Management. In January 2013, it was announced that he had bid to take Dell Inc. private for $24.4 billion in the biggest management buyout since the Great Recession. Dell Inc. officially went private in October 2013. The company went public again in December 2018.

== Early life and education ==
Dell was born on February 23, 1965 in Houston, Texas. His parents were Alexander Dell, an orthodontist, and Lorraine Charlotte (née Langfan), a stockbroker. Michael attended Herod Elementary School in Houston. In a bid to enter business early, he applied to take a high school equivalency exam at the age of eight. In his early teens, he invested his earnings from part-time jobs into stocks and precious metals.

Dell attended Memorial High School in Houston, selling subscriptions to the Houston Post in the summer. Dell's parents wanted him to be a doctor, so to please them, he took up pre-med at the University of Texas in 1983. Dell continued learning to target specific populations for newspaper subscriptions rather than just making cold calls. He discovered that people who were most likely to get a subscription were newlyweds and people moving to a new home. After collecting the contact information of this population from public records, he sent direct mail appeals and earned $18,000 in one year. He hired several employees, and after earning a gross profit of nearly $200,000 in his first year of business, Dell dropped out of the University of Texas at age 19.

== Business career ==
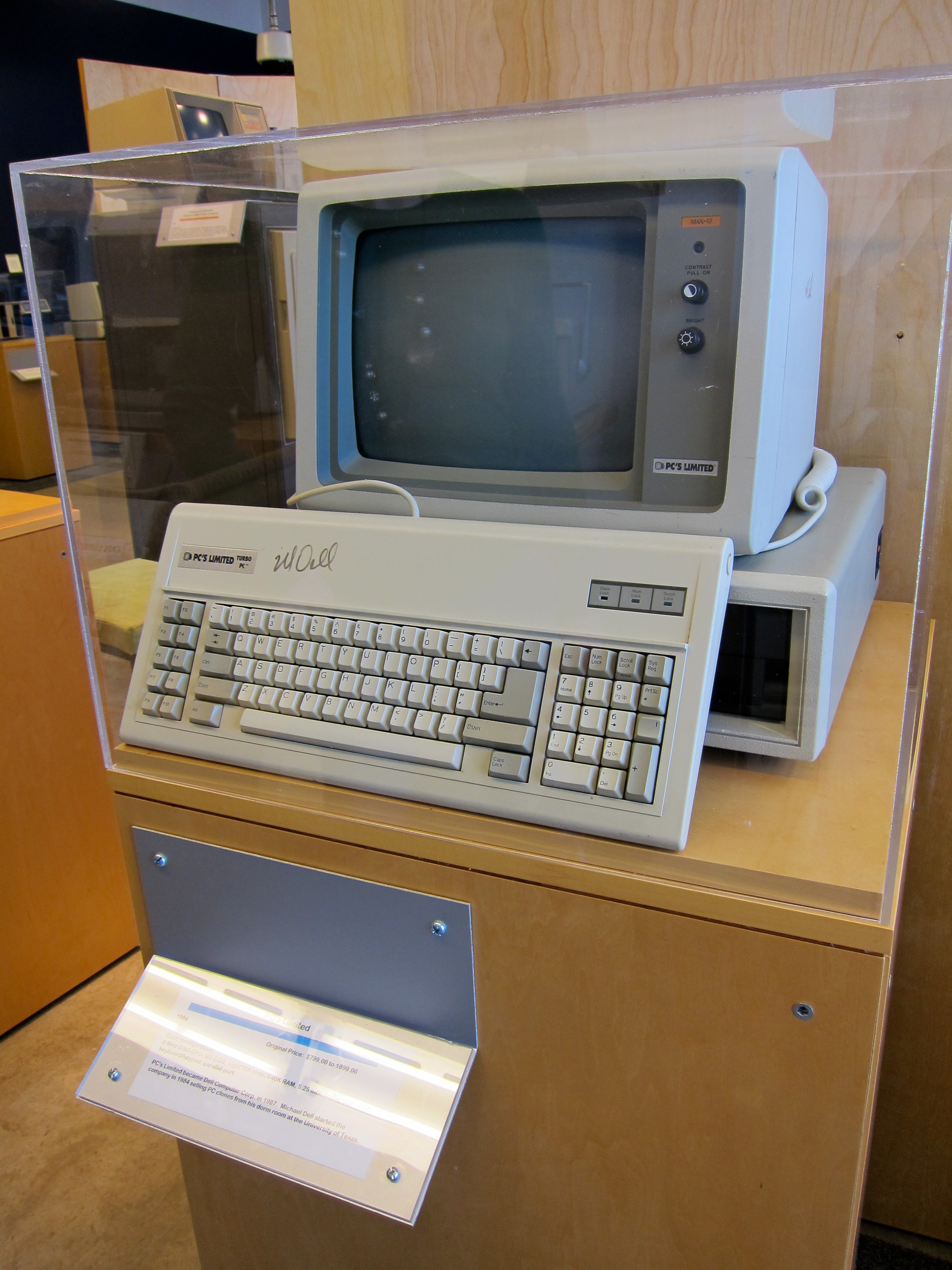
A PC's Limited Turbo PC signed by Dell

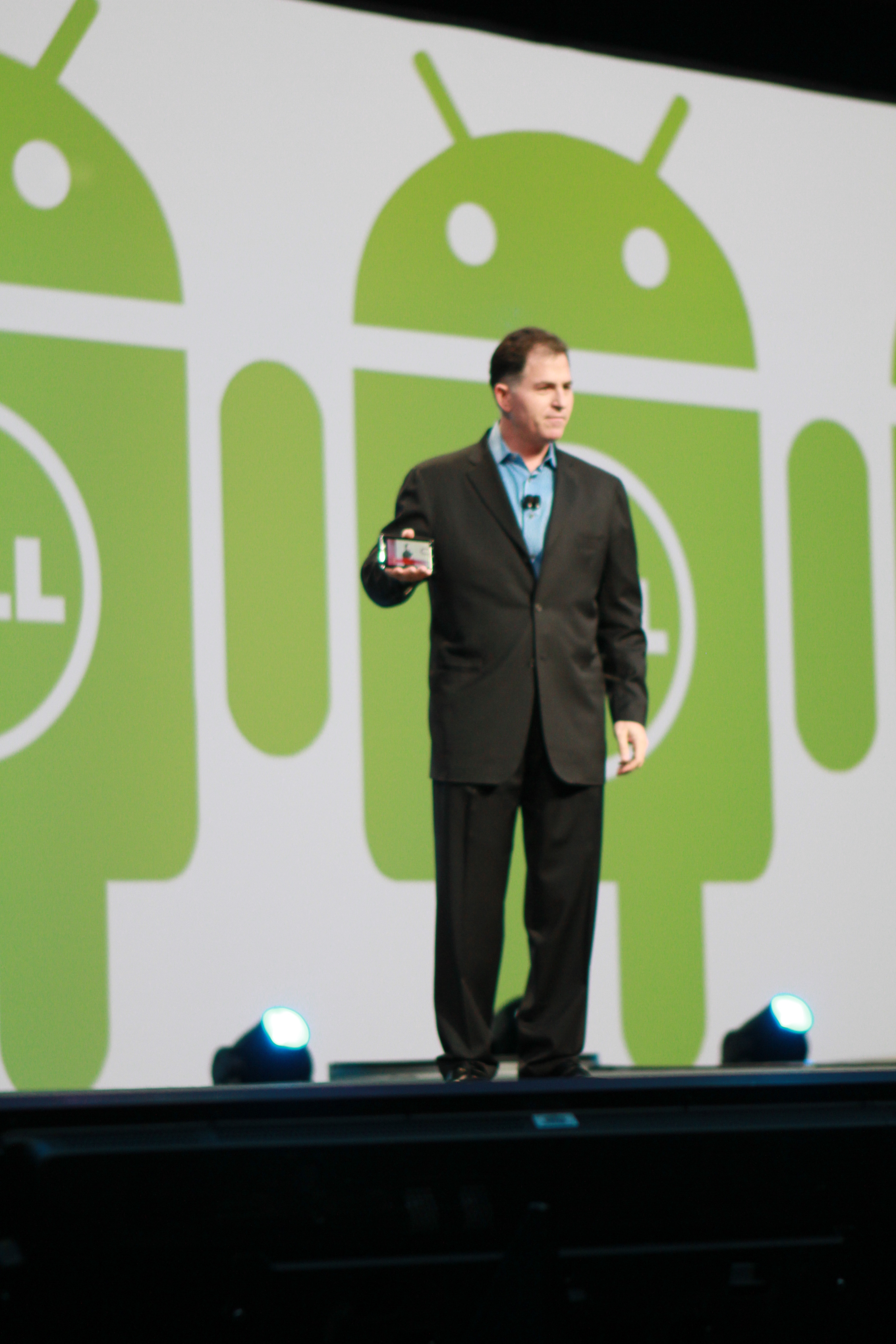
Michael Dell lecturing at the Oracle OpenWorld, San Francisco, 2010

While a freshman pre-med student at the University of Texas, Dell started an informal business putting together and selling upgrade kits for personal computers in Room 2713 of the Dobie Center residential building. He then applied for a vendor license to bid on contracts for the State of Texas, winning bids by not having the overhead of a computer store.

In January 1984, Dell recognized that selling PCs directly to consumers could cut costs compared to traditional retail. He registered his company as "PC's Limited" and began operating from a condominium, selling between $50,000 and $80,000 worth of PC upgrades, kits, and add-on components. Dell's strategy was to manufacture computers after receiving orders. In May, Dell incorporated the company as "Dell Computer Corporation" and relocated to a business center in North Austin. The company employed a few people as order takers, a few more to fill the orders, and, as Dell recalled, a manufacturing staff consisting of "three guys with screwdrivers sitting at six-foot tables". The venture's capitalization cost was $1,000. During the formative years of Dell Computer, Dell was mentored by Morton Meyerson.

In 1992, aged 27, he became the youngest CEO of a company ranked in Fortune magazine's list of the top 500 corporations. In 1996, Dell started selling computers over the Web, the same year his company launched its first servers. By March 1997, Dell Inc. reported about $1 million in sales per day from dell.com. In the first quarter of 2001, Dell Inc. reached a world market share of 12.8 percent, surpassing Compaq to become the world's largest PC maker. The metric marked the first time the rankings had shifted over the previous seven years. The company's combined shipments of desktops, notebooks and servers grew 34.3 percent worldwide and 30.7 percent in the United States at a time when competitors' sales were shrinking.

On March 4, 2004, Dell stepped down as CEO, but stayed as chairman of Dell Inc.'s board, while Kevin Rollins, then president and COO, became president and CEO. On January 31, 2007, Dell returned as CEO at the request of the board, succeeding Rollins.

In 2013, Michael Dell with the help of Silver Lake Partners, Microsoft, and a consortium of lenders took Dell, Inc. private. The deal was reportedly worth $25 billion and faced difficulties during its execution. Notable resistance came from Carl Icahn, but after several months he stepped aside. Michael Dell received a 75% stake in the company.

On October 12, 2015, Dell Inc. announced its intent to acquire the enterprise software and storage company EMC Corporation. At $67 billion, it was then labeled the "highest-valued tech acquisition in history". The acquisition was finalized September 7, 2016.

In May 2024, Dell announced a partnership with Nvidia and ServiceNow to develop "AI factories", aiming to provide scalable AI infrastructure solutions to enterprise clients.

He acquired a 5.3% minority ownership stake in the Las Vegas Raiders NFL team in May 2026.

=== Accounting fraud allegations ===
In July 2010, Dell Inc. agreed to pay a $100 million penalty to settle SEC charges of disclosure and accounting fraud in relation to undisclosed payments from Intel Corporation. Michael Dell and former CEO Kevin Rollins agreed to pay $4 million each and former CFO James Schneider agreed to pay $3 million to settle the charges.

== Accolades ==
Accolades for Dell include "Entrepreneur of the Year" (at age 24) from Inc. magazine; "Top CEO in American Business" from Worth magazine; "CEO of the Year" from Financial World, IndustryWeek and Chief Executive magazines. Dell also received the 1998 Golden Plate Award of the American Academy of Achievement and the 2013 Franklin Institute's Bower Award for Business Leadership. In 2026, Donald Trump awarded Dell the National Medal of Technology and Innovation.

== Personal life ==
Dell married Susan Lieberman on October 28, 1989, in Austin, Texas, where the couple resides with their four children.

=== Wealth ===
The centerpiece of the Kukio neighborhood in Hawaii is the 18,500-square-foot Raptor Residence, owned by Dell and valued at $64.7 million. With three lots and the widest waterfront view of any house in the neighborhood, Dell's house has seven bedrooms, seven full bathrooms, and five half bathrooms. Additionally, Dell owns a portion of Hualālai, which he purchased in 2006 through his private investment company.

In 1998, Dell founded MSD Capital L.P., later renamed DFO Management, to manage his family's investments.

=== Donations ===
Michael and Susan Dell established the Michael & Susan Dell Foundation in 1999, which focuses on causes related to health and education. According to Susan Dell, they have given away over $3 billion over the past 26 years, mostly to children's causes. This would put the Dells among the nation's top givers.

In December 2025, Michael and Susan Dell announced they would donate $6.25 billion to investment accounts for children, known as Trump accounts, in the United States. The donation is expected to provide $250 to 25 million children in ZIP codes with a median income of $150k or less for children 10 or under who were born before January 1, 2025. The Dells hope that other philanthropists, corporations, as well as state and local governments will contribute to the accounts.

=== Publications ===
Dell has published two books: a 1999 book, Direct from Dell: Strategies That Revolutionized an Industry (by HarperBusiness) written in collaboration with Catherine Fredman, and 2021 book Play Nice But Win: A CEO's Journey from Founder to Leader (by Portfolio) written in collaboration with James Kaplan.

=== Affiliations ===
Dell is on the Foundation Board of the World Economic Forum, the executive committee of the International Business Council, the U.S. Business Council. He was a member of the U.S. President's Council of Advisors on Science and Technology and was reappointed to the council by President Donald Trump in 2026. In April 2020, Governor Greg Abbott named Dell to the Strike Force to Open Texas – a group "tasked with finding safe and effective ways to slowly reopen the state" during the COVID-19 pandemic. He was an advisor on the COVID-19 Technology Task Force, a technology industry coalition founded in March 2020 collaborating on solutions to respond to and recover from the COVID-19 pandemic.
