= Ralph Feigin =

American pediatrician (1938–2008)

Ralph David Feigin (April 3, 1938 – August 14, 2008) was an American pediatrician whose influential book Textbook of Pediatric Infectious Diseases was in its sixth printing at the time of his death.

== Life and career ==
Feigin was born in Manhattan on April 3, 1938.

=== Education ===
He graduated from Columbia University with his A.B. degree in 1958 and followed with his medical degree from Boston University School of Medicine in 1962. He then underwent an internship at Boston City Hospital from 1962–63 and became a resident from 1963-64. He completed his residency at Massachusetts General Hospital in 1965.

=== Career ===
After conducting research for the United States Army from 1965 to 1967, and becoming chief resident of the Children's Service of Massachusetts General Hospital, Feigin was a professor of pediatrics at the School of Medicine at Washington University in St. Louis in 1968.

He took a faculty appointment at the Baylor College of Medicine in 1977, and was its President and CEO from 1996 to 2003. He was Chair of the Baylor College of Medicine Department of Pediatrics from 1977-2008. During this time, Feigin led the nation in grants for pediatric studies in 2003 and 2004. Many of these grants were funded by the National Institutes of Health.

Feigin was the Physician-in-Chief at Texas Children's Hospital from 1977 until the time of his death in 2008. He received the John Howland Award, the most prestigious honor given by the American Pediatric Society (APS), in 2007.

=== Publications ===
Feigin was co-author and editor of numerous textbooks in pediatrics and infectious disease. His most influential works include: Feigin and Cherry's Textbook of Pediatric Infectious Diseases, Oski's Pediatrics: Principles and Practice. He was the associate editor for Pediatrics, the official journal of the American Academy of Pediatrics.

=== Death ===
Feigin, a nonsmoker, died of lung cancer in Houston, Texas. Feigin was married to Judith Zobel Feigin, and they had three children.
