= Brackenridge Hospital =

Former municipal hospital in Austin, Texas

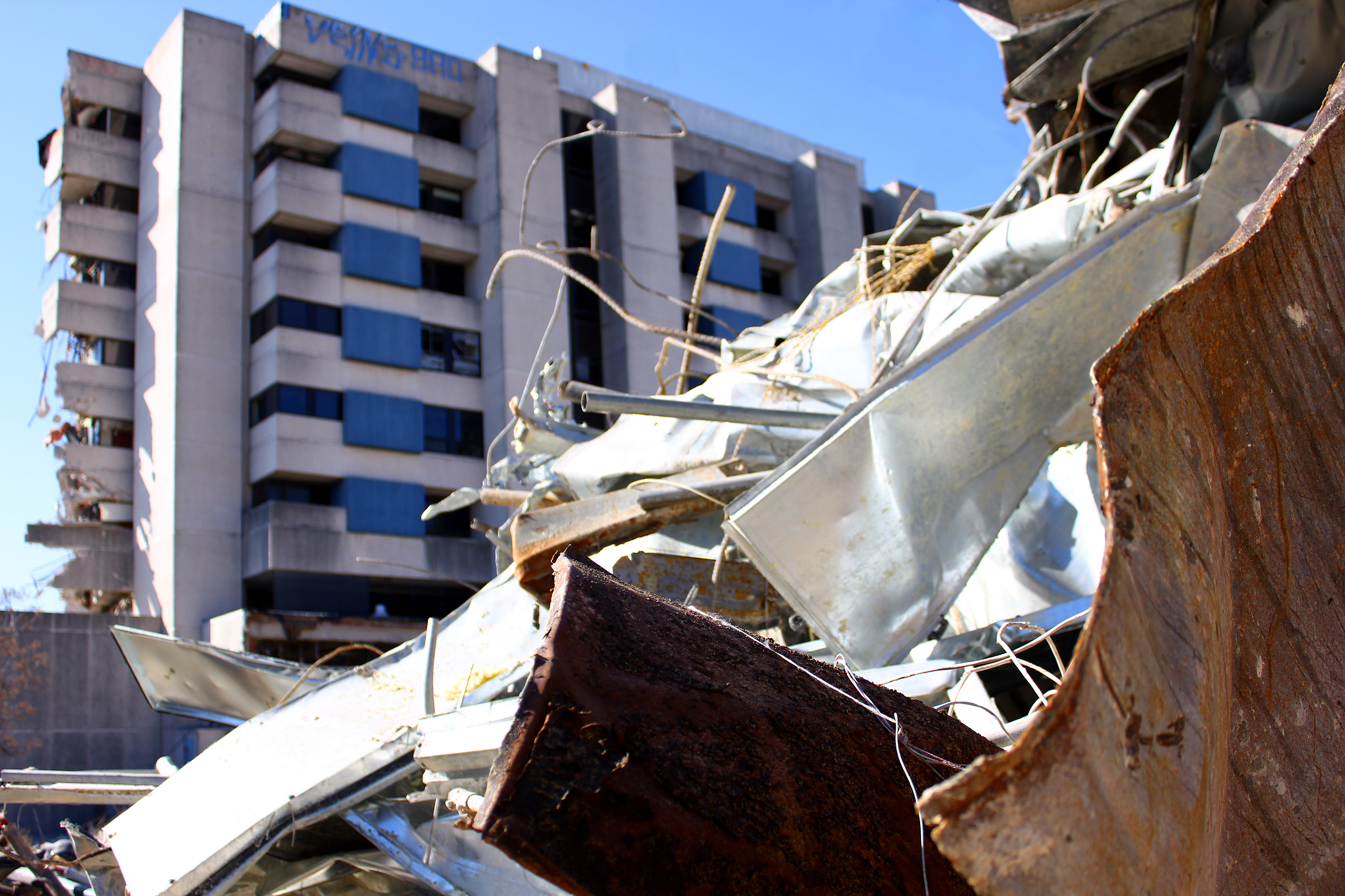
- Brackenridge Hospital tower in the process of demolition in 2020

Geography
- Location: Austin, Texas, United States
- Coordinates: 30.274°N 97.734°W

Organization
- Funding: Non-profit hospital
- Type: General
- Network: Ascension

Services
- Emergency department: Level I trauma center

History
- Former names: City–County Hospital; University Medical Center Brackenridge
- Opened: July 3, 1884
- Closed: May 21, 2017

Links
- Lists: Hospitals in Texas

Brackenridge Hospital, also known as University Medical Center Brackenridge, (UMC Brackenridge) was the public hospital of Austin, Texas. It had the nickname "Brack".

== History ==
On July 3, 1884, the City-County Hospital, which had two stories, was established on a block in what was then northeast Austin. That block had been, in the 1839 Waller Plan, designated to house a hospital. The cost of the initial building was $10,000. It became solely owned by the City of Austin when Travis County ended its share of the ownership in 1907. A 45-bed replacement building opened in 1915. In 1929 the Austin City Council renamed the hospital after hospital board chairperson Robert J. Brackenridge. In 1969, a replacement building opened, with a price tag of $43 million. It eventually housed 363 beds, as the final phase opened in 1984.

In 1995 the city began contracting the operation of the hospital to Seton Healthcare Family. In 2004 the city sold the hospital to Central Health.

The hospital closed on May 21, 2017, as it was replaced by the Dell Seton Medical Center.

Brackenridge's demolition began in August 2017. The tower's demolition originally was to begin in 2018, but as the Austin city government took time to issue a permit for that, its demolition began in summer 2019. Demolition ended in 2021. An office building is to be built on the former site. Central Health planned to use the money gained from selling the land to fund healthcare services.

While it was vacant, the hospital was used as a filming location for the television show Fear the Walking Dead.
