= Trump account =

Type of United States investment account

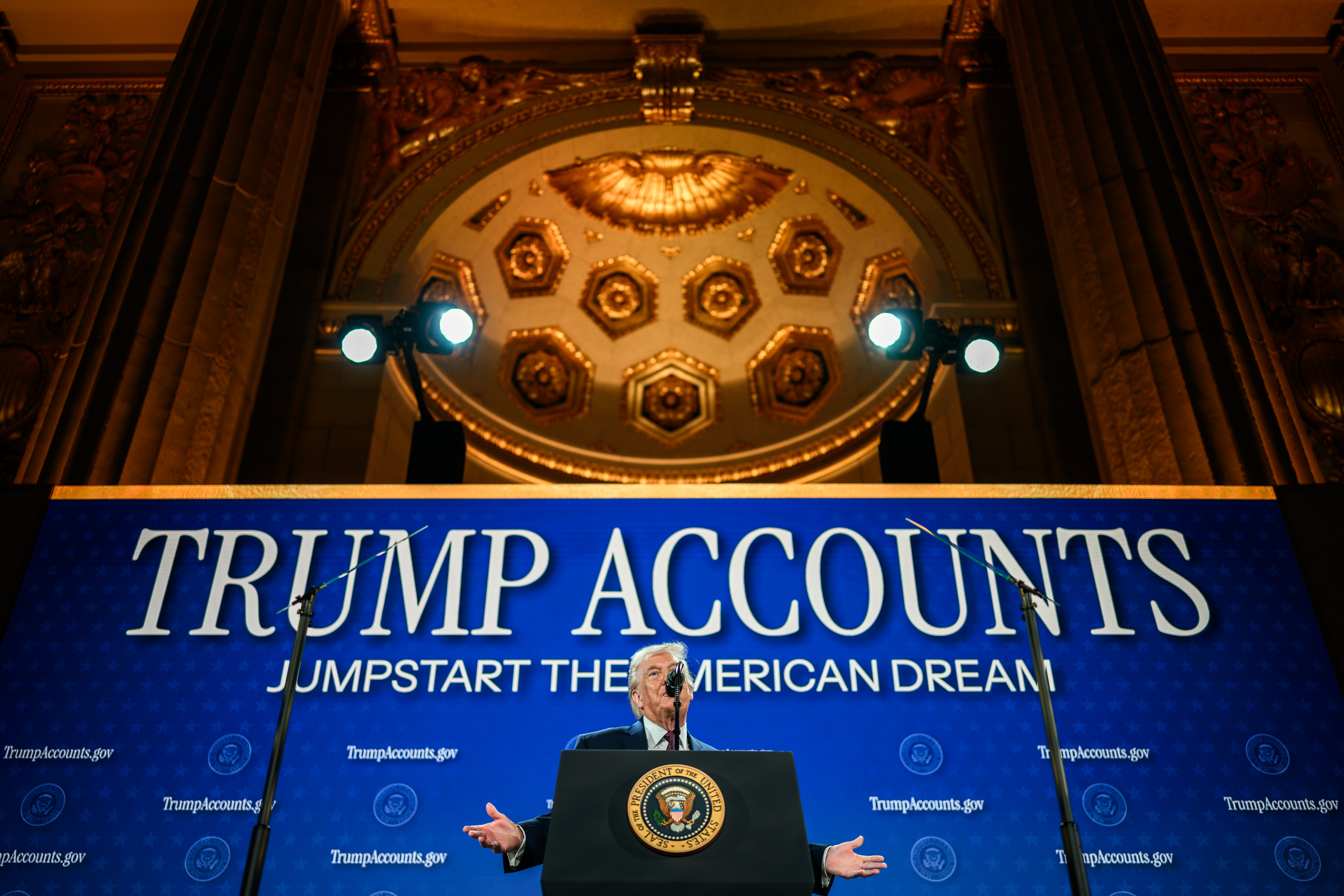
Donald Trump in front of Trump accounts signage

A Trump account, also known as a 530A account, is a stock market index investment account in the United States established for a U.S. citizen child. Trump accounts were initially authorized in law by the 2025 One Big Beautiful Bill Act (OBBBA) and became available in July 2026.

Certain aspects of how Trump accounts function remain unclear, but the Internal Revenue Service (IRS) released a notice of its planned regulations in December 2025. The IRS describes a Trump account as a type of individual retirement account (IRA). Before January 1 of the calendar year in which the child will reach 18 years old, the funds in the account cannot be withdrawn, and after that, the account will be treated the same as a traditional IRA.

Trump accounts generally have more restrictions and fewer tax benefits than some other investment accounts such as 529 accounts, traditional and Roth individual retirement accounts, health savings accounts, 401(k) accounts, and 403(b) accounts. However, the U.S. government and private donors will provide funds for deposit into Trump accounts for some children. This is expected to include US$1,000 deposits offered by the federal government for U.S. citizen children born in 2025–2028 and US$250 deposits offered by Michael and Susan Dell (the chief executive officer of Dell Technologies and his wife) for up to twenty-five million other children born in 2016–2024 who live in ZIP Codes where the median family income is US$150,000 or less.

Trump accounts became available for initial deposits on July 4, 2026 (the 250th anniversary of the U.S. Declaration of Independence). In April 2026, the U.S. Treasury announced it designated BNY as a financial agent to manage initial accounts. The bank will be partnering with Robinhood to develop a Trump accounts app and provide customer service.

== Name ==
The One Big Beautiful Bill Act (OBBBA) of 2025 and the associated section of the Internal Revenue Code (IRC) that it created refer to the children's investment accounts created by the OBBBA as "Trump accounts". To try to avoid the political overtones of the official name, the accounts have sometimes been referred to as 530A accounts, in reference to the section of the IRC that defines the accounts. The accounts were known by at least two other names before being enacted into law. Initially conceived as Invest America accounts, the name was changed to "MAGA accounts", a backronym for "money accounts for growth and advancement", on its way to the House Ways and Means committee. The name was then changed to Trump accounts at the last minute as the bill was finalized by Republicans in the House of Representatives. According to The Wall Street Journal, president Donald Trump's association with the name of the accounts may dissuade some families from participating in the accounts. The accounts are created using IRS "Form 4547", named after Trump's 45th and 47th presidential terms.

== History ==
Trump accounts were conceived by the Texas senator Ted Cruz. Although Cruz had discussed the idea within the GOP and with House Speaker Mike Johnson for over a year, many were surprised when it was included in the May 2025 first draft of the OBBBA. According to Cruz, President Trump directly pushed for its inclusion. During its proposal, Trump accounts remained the same between the House and Senate bills. In addition to inclusion in the OBBBA, Cruz introduced the Invest America Act, and Utah representative Blake Moore introduced the MAGA Act in collaboration with Cruz.

The concept paralleled New Jersey senator Cory Booker's baby bonds proposal. However, in contrast to Booker's proposal where accounts would be managed by the US Treasury and not investable in equity markets, Trump accounts will consist entirely of stock equity investments and will be managed by private companies. Cruz stated that many young people have a negative view of capitalism and favor socialism, and that Trump accounts would "help create new capitalists" by letting more Americans have a stake in the financial system and benefit from tax-deferred compounding.

In June, ahead of the bill's passage by the Senate, Donald Trump promoted the accounts at the White House. The accounts were set to become available on July 4, 2026, the United States Semiquincentennial. At an Invest America Council meeting in June 2025, several business executives stated they would provide capital for the initiative. Michael Dell, the chief executive of Dell Technologies, stated that his company would match the government's contributions for its employees. In a statement, Robinhood Markets offered to provide technology and capital for the accounts. Nvidia chief executive Jensen Huang, who did not attend the event, additionally stated that his company would contribute to accounts managed by its employees.

In December, Dell and his wife, Susan, announced that they would donate $6.25 billion to fund Trump accounts for up to twenty-five million children, providing $250 each for children below eleven years old who live in ZIP codes in the United States where the median family income is $150,000 or less and were born before January 1, 2025. Since they are for children who are older than those covered by the federal $1,000 grants, the Dell contributions will be for children who do not receive the federal grants.

The Trump account app was launched on May 28, 2026. On July 6, 2026, SpaceX President Gwynne Shotwell and her husband said that they planned to donate one share each of SpaceX stock to two million children's Trump Accounts, a total value of $320 million at the time of announcement. On October 19, 2026, SpaceX Founder Elon Musk announced that he would donate one share of his SpaceX stock to every child in America via Trump Accounts in 2027, representing a total value of ~$10.5 billion at the time of the announcement. According to United States Census data as of July 1, 2025, there are 72 million children in the United States.

== Function and financing ==
Trump Accounts presentation by Scott Bessent in May 2026

A Trump account is an investment account, but with fewer tax advantages than individual retirement accounts (IRAs) and health savings accounts (HSAs). The Wall Street Journal described the accounts as custodial IRAs, although they do not have all the tax advantages of IRAs. Investment income in the account is tax deferred until withdrawn, and ordinary income taxes (as opposed to capital gain taxes) are paid upon withdrawal. The accounts are limited to investments in low-cost mutual funds or exchange-traded funds that track broad stock market indexes such as the S&P 500 index and have an expense ratio of up to 0.1% and are primarily composed of U.S. equities; industry-specific and sector-specific indexes cannot be used as investments. Broker sales commissions can be charged and are not expected to be subject to the 0.1% expense ratio limit.

AP News reported that "the U.S. Department of the Treasury will deposit $1,000 into investment accounts it sets up for American children born between Jan. 1, 2025 and Dec. 31, 2028." Parents, friends, and certain other parties will also be able to make deposits into Trump accounts. The child is not required to pay income tax when these deposits are made, but they are made from after-tax funds of the giver and will eventually be taxed as income to the account beneficiary when they are later withdrawn from the account. Up to $5,000 per year per child can be deposited in total by family members, employers, and other private parties. Contributions from employers are limited to $2,500 per year per employee for all children combined. Starting in 2028, the contribution limits will be adjusted for inflation. Contributions from the federal government, local governments, and 501(c)(3) tax-exempt non-profit organizations (charities) do not count against the $5,000 limit. Deposits provided by charities can only be "given to a qualified class of account beneficiaries".

There are limits on what can be done with the money in the account. Before January 1 of the year when the child turns 18, the money cannot be withdrawn from the account for any reason (unless the child dies or the money is being transferred into another similarly restricted account). After the child turns 18, the account is treated the same as a traditional IRA. Early reports characterized the accounts as being for education, home purchasing, or starting a business, but later IRS guidance does not restrict how the funds can be used when withdrawn. As with a traditional IRA, there is a 10% early withdrawal penalty for withdrawal of account funds prior to age 59 1/2, and this penalty would be waived under some circumstances, including first-time home purchases (up to $10,000), higher education expenses, death, disability, un-reimbursed medical expenses, health insurance, annuity payments, and payments of IRS levies, all of which must meet certain stipulations. There is no special treatment of withdrawals used for starting a business.

Financial experts have generally cautioned against depositing personal funds into Trump accounts, saying that some other types of accounts, such as 529 accounts, IRAs, and custodial brokerage accounts have more advantages. Adam Michael, a director of tax policy studies at the Cato Institute, said "Generally speaking, parents should not put their own money into a Trump account." He said Trump accounts have "many more strings attached and complicated rules that make it not an attractive overall investment vehicle". However, if third-party money is offered, they say it may be worth establishing an account in order to receive it. "The primary use case for the accounts is to receive free money from sources like the government or private donations," Michael said. Similarly, Madeline Brown, a wealth and financial policy expert for the Urban Institute, said "The gift is the biggest part of this. It really is free money."

== Responses ==
=== Government ===
In July 2025, secretary of the treasury Scott Bessent described Trump accounts as a "back door for privatizing Social Security". Despite expressing opposition to many provisions of the OBBBA, Senate Minority Whip Dick Durbin praised the idea of Trump accounts, saying that "even a stopped watch" was right twice a day. The accounts are estimated to cost the United States Department of the Treasury US$15 billion by 2034, according to the Congressional Joint Committee on Taxation.

=== Academia ===
According to professor Jin Huang, co-director of the Center for Social Development at Washington University in St. Louis, without automatic enrollment, millions of eligible children will likely miss out.

=== Private sector ===
Wall Street is supportive of the idea because of new potential customers and investment funds. According to Brad Gerstner, who worked with Cruz on the concept and is the CEO of Altimeter Capital, companies are eager to support the idea.
