= Dell Medical School =

Medical school in Austin, Texas, US

Coordinates: 30.275313°N 97.732901°W

Dell Medical School at the University of Texas at Austin
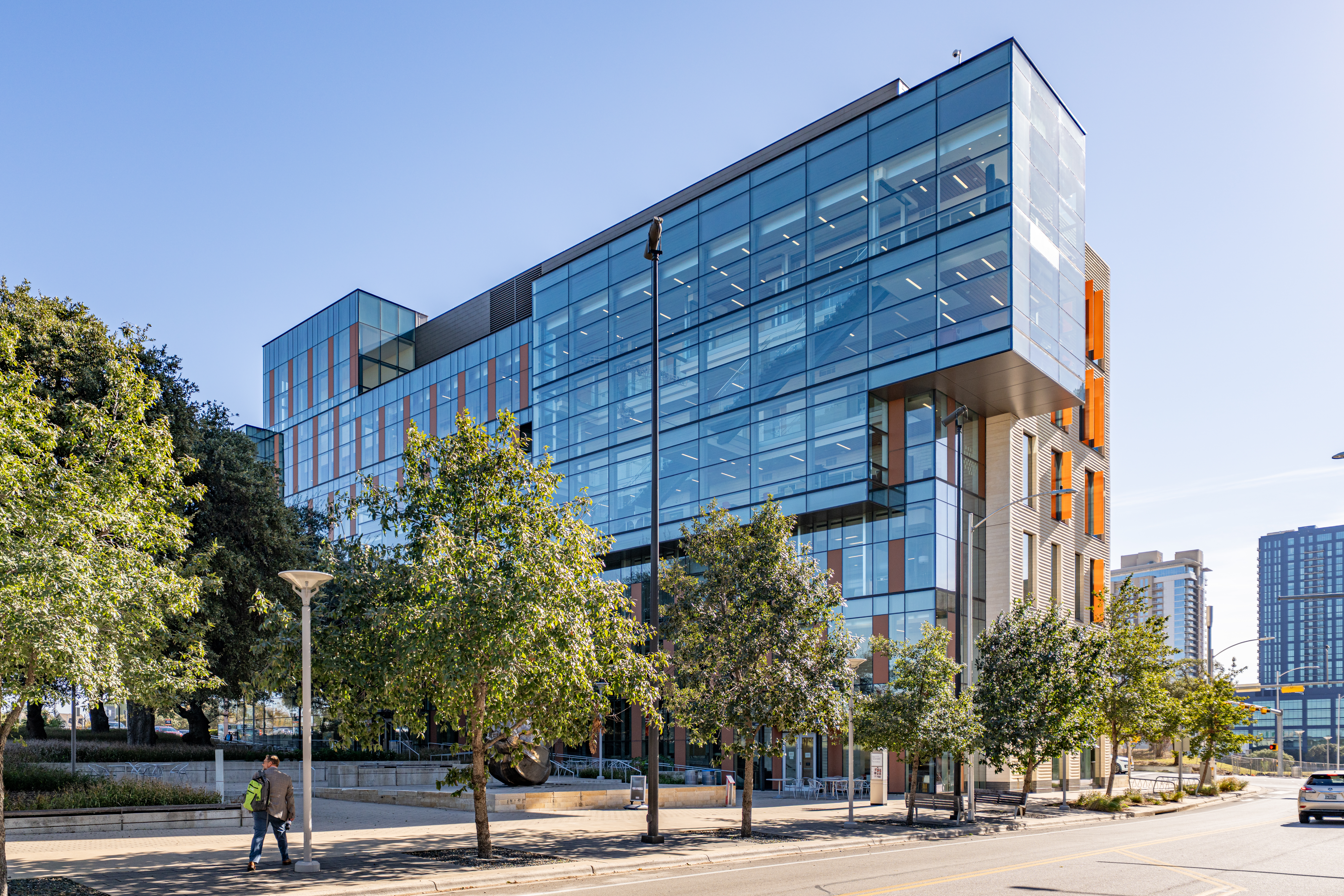
- Dell Medical School Health Learning Building (2025)
- Type: Public; Medical school
- Established: 2013; 13 years ago
- Endowment: $20.6 million (August 31, 2018)
- Dean: Claudia F. Lucchinetti, M.D.
- Undergraduates: 200 (first class started Summer 2016)
- Postgraduates: 340
- Location: Austin, Texas, US
- Campus: Urban
- Website: dellmed.utexas.edu

The Dell Medical School is the graduate medical school of the University of Texas at Austin in Austin, Texas. The school opened to the inaugural class of 50 students in the summer of 2016 as the newest of 18 colleges and schools on the UT Austin campus. S. Claiborne "Clay" Johnston was named as the medical school's inaugural dean in January 2014. On September 1, 2021, Johnston stepped down from his position and George Macones was named interim dean. Claudia Lucchinetti, M.D. was announced as the new dean and began her term on December 1, 2022.

In accordance with the Medical District Master Plan released in 2013, the university's portion of the medical district is being constructed in four phases. The new medical campus includes the Health Transformation Building, Health Learning Building, Health Discovery Building and Health Center Garage. They sit on existing University property at the southeastern corner of the central campus, adjacent to the UT School of Nursing and to the Dell Seton Medical Center—the new $295 million, 211-bed teaching hospital that Seton Healthcare built.

In late 2011, Texas Senator Kirk Watson created a list of ten health-care centered goals he hoped to achieve within ten years for his Central Texas district. Number one on that list was to build a medical school. In May 2012, the Board of Regents allocated $25 million of annual funding to a UT Austin medical school, plus another $40 million spread over eight years for faculty recruiting. In November 2012, Travis County voters approved a proposition to raise property tax revenue in support of health care initiatives for Central Texas, including $35 million annually for a medical school. The school refused to fill out the U.S. News statistical survey, so it is unranked for both Research and Primary Care by U.S. News & World Report.

The medical school is named after the Michael & Susan Dell Foundation, which pledged $50 million over ten years to the school..

In January 2026 the Dell Medical School received a $100 million donation for towards a collaboration between the Dell Medical School and MD Anderson Cancer Center. On April 21, 2026, Michael Dell announced the donation of $750 million dollars to the Dell Medical School for the construction of an AI building, at the J. J. Pickle Research Campus.
