= Peter H. Lin =

American vascular surgeon

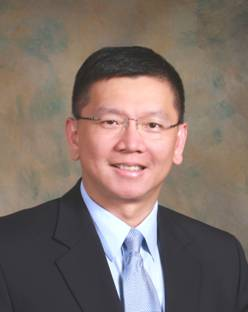
- Born: Taiwan
- Education: University of California, Riverside (BS); Rosalind Franklin University of Medicine and Science (MD)
- Medical career
- Field: Vascular surgery
- Institutions: Baylor College of Medicine
- Website: www.drpeterlin.com

Peter Lin is an American vascular surgeon, medical researcher, specializing in minimally invasive endovascular treatment of vascular disease. He has published extensively in the area of vascular surgery and endovascular surgery.

Lin is a professor emeritus of surgery at the Baylor College of Medicine in Houston, Texas, where he was a member of its surgical faculty from 2001 to 2015. He also served as the chief of vascular surgery at the Michael E. DeBakey Veterans Affairs Medical Center in Houston from 2001 to 2007. In 2006, he became the chief of vascular surgery of the department of surgery at Baylor College of Medicine, holding that position until 2015 when he moved to Los Angeles.

== Early life and education ==
Lin was born in Taiwan, and he earned his undergraduate degree in biology from the University of California, Riverside in 1988. He graduated from the Rosalind Franklin University of Medicine and Science / Chicago Medical School in Chicago Illinois in 1992. He completed his general surgery residency at Mount Sinai Medical Center in Chicago, Illinois, and was concurrently a research assistant in the Vascular Surgery Research Lab at the Loyola Stritch School of Medicine in Maywood, Illinois. From 1998 to 2000, he completed a Vascular Surgery fellowship and an Endovascular Surgery fellowship at the Emory University School of Medicine in Atlanta, Georgia.

== Medical career ==
As a faculty member at Baylor, he carried out research in vascular surgery. His clinical interests primarily involve minimally invasive endovascular therapy of deep vein thrombosis, peripheral arterial disease, and pulmonary embolism. His clinical experience in endovascular intervention in part contributed to the clinical approval of treatment indication using thrombolytic therapy in acute pulmonary embolism.

He served as a physician advisor to Congressman Gene Green who introduced Aneurysm Detection Bill in 2004 which provided Medicare coverage for Abdominal Aortic Aneurysm (AAA) screening and detection. The legislation became known as the Screening Abdominal Aortic Aneurysms Very Efficiently (SAAAVE) Act of 2004 (HR 4626).

== Research interests and contributions ==
Lin has published more than 400 scholarly articles in scientific journals. He has authored more than 60 book chapters and edited 3 vascular textbooks. Lin's research interest is in cellular dysfunction in arterial and venous thrombosis as well as experimental model of endovascular therapy. His research expertise also includes clinical outcome of endovascular interventions. He was the principal investigator on a five-year National Institute of Health grant to study hypertension and homocysteinemia in atherosclerotic lesion formation.

== Honors and awards ==
- 2001 - Allastair Karmody Award – Society for Clinical Vascular Surgery
- 2002 - American Venous Forum Research Award
- 2008 - Baylor College of Medicine Michael E. DeBakey Distinguished Service Award

== Publications ==
Partial list:

- Lin, P.H. (2011). "Endovascular interventions for acute pulmonary embolism". Perspectives in Vascular Surgery and Endovascular Therapy. 22 (3): 171–182. doi:10.1177/1531003510379880. PMID 21098498.
- Lin, P.H. (2010). "Catheter-directed thrombectomy and thrombolysis for symptomatic lower-extremity deep vein thrombosis". Perspectives in Vascular Surgery and Endovascular Therapy. 22 (3): 152–163. doi:10.1177/1531003510378756. PMID 21098496.
- Lin, P.H.; Weakley, S.M.; Kougias, P. (2010). "How to interpret data from the superficial femoral artery stenting trials and registries". Seminar of Vascular Surgery. 23 (3): 138–147. doi:10.1053/J.SEMVASCSURG.2010.05.001. PMID 20826290.
- Lin, P.H. (2009). "Comparison of percutaneous ultrasound accelerated thrombolysis vesus catheter-directed thrombolysis in patients with acute massive pulmonary embolism". Vascular. 18 (1): 63–68. doi:10.2310/6670.2009.00063. PMID 19919804. S2CID 4828023.
- Lin, P.H. (2009). "Hypogastric artery preservation during endovascular aortic aneurysm repair: is it important?". Seminar of Vascular Surgery. 22 (3): 193–200. doi:10.1053/j.semvascsurg.2009.07.012. PMID 19765531.
- Lin, P.H. (2008). "Endovascular repair of traumatic thoracic aortic injuries: a critical appraisal". Asian Cardiovasc Thorac Ann. 16 (4): 337–345. doi:10.1177/021849230801600419. PMID 18670033. S2CID 4842622.
- Lin, P.H. (2009). "Descending thoracic aortic dissection: evaluation and management in the era of endovascular technology". Vascular and Endovascular Surgery. 43 (1): 5–24. doi:10.1177/1538574408318475. PMID 18583304. S2CID 4826109.
- Lin, P.H. (2008). "Concomitant colorectal cancer and abdominal aortic aneurysm: evolution of treatment paradigm in the endovascular era". Journal of the American College of Surgeons. 206 (5): 1065–1073. doi:10.1016/j.jamcollsurg.2007.12.011. PMID 18471757.
- Lin, P.H. (2008). "Prospective randomized trials of carotid artery stenting versus carotid endarterectomy: an appraisal of the current literature". Vascular and Endovascular Surgery. 42 (1): 5–11. doi:10.1177/1538574407312654. PMID 18238861. S2CID 4800233.
