= Baylor College of Medicine =

Private medical school in Houston, Texas

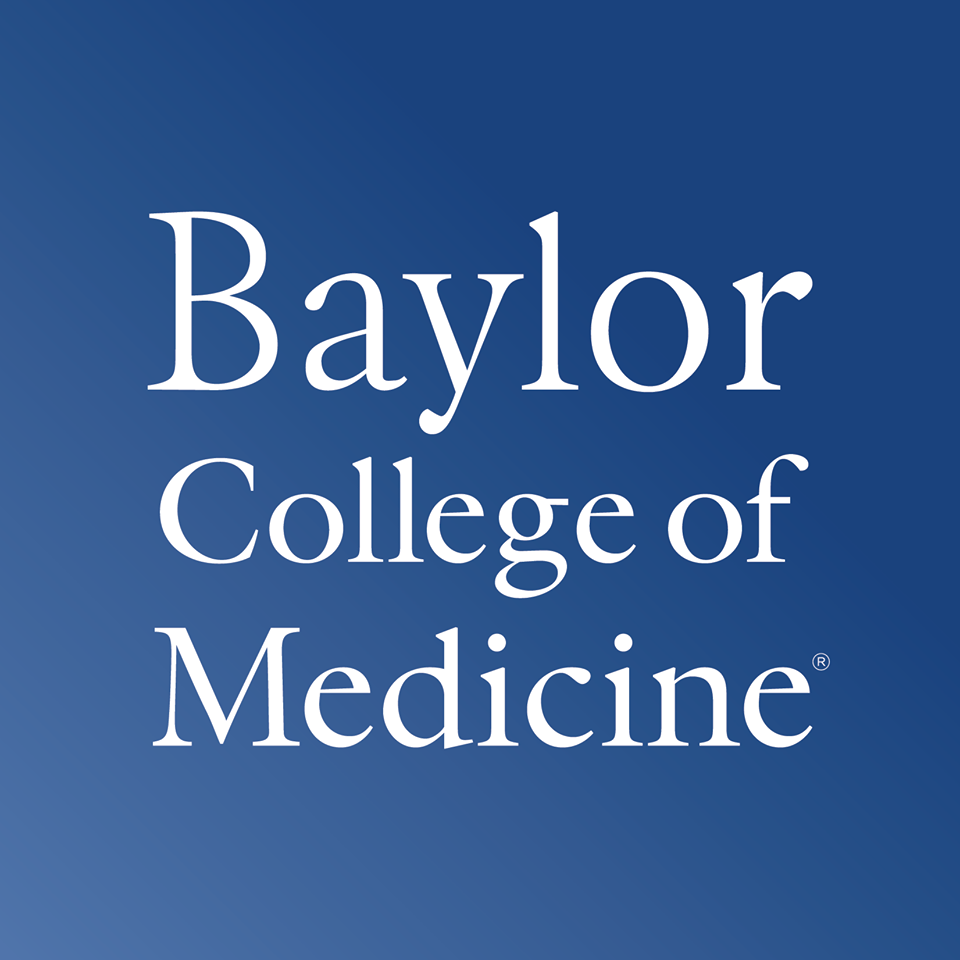
- Former names: University of Dallas Medical Department; Baylor University College of Medicine
- Type: Private medical school
- Established: 1900; 126 years ago
- Affiliations: Ben Taub Hospital; Texas Children's Hospital; MD Anderson Cancer Center; TIRR Memorial Hermann; Menninger Clinic; Michael E. DeBakey VA Medical Center; Children's Hospital of San Antonio; Baylor Scott & White Health
- Endowment: $1.48 billion (2024)
- President: Jakub Tolar
- Faculty: 6,209 faculty: 4,115 full-time; 454 part-time; 1,421 voluntary; 219 emeritus
- Postgraduates: 1,577 students: School of Medicine - 758; Graduate School of Biomedical Sciences - 563; School of Health Professions - 256; 1,151 clinical residents 507 clinical fellows 552 postdoctoral fellows 23 tropical medicine course participants
- Location: Houston, Texas, United States
- Campus: Urban, Texas Medical Center
- Website: bcm.edu

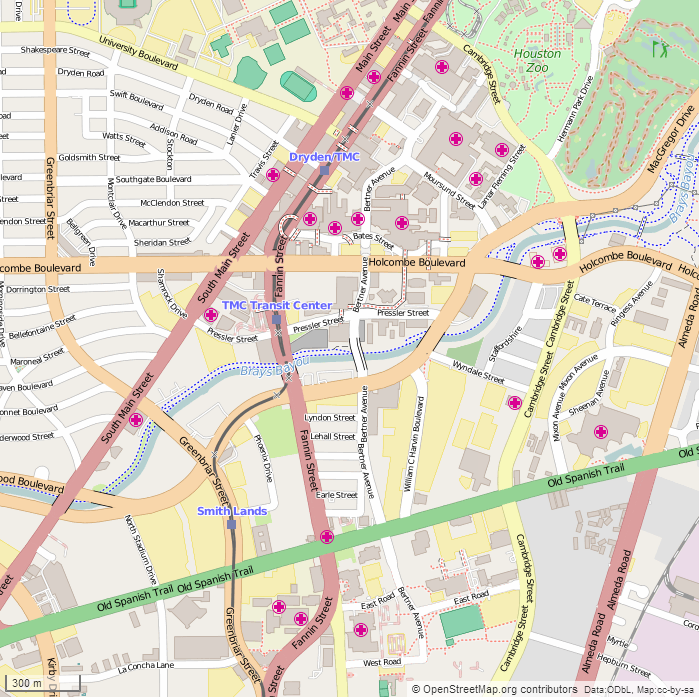
Location within Texas Medical Center

The Baylor College of Medicine (BCM) is a private medical school in Houston, Texas, United States. The school was originally a college of Baylor University and was known as the Baylor University College of Medicine, but it separated from Baylor in 1969 and became an independent institution. The college consists of four schools: the School of Medicine, the Graduate School of Biomedical Sciences, the School of Health Professions, and the National School of Tropical Medicine.

The school is part owner, alongside Catholic Health Initiatives (CHI), of Baylor St. Luke's Medical Center, the flagship hospital of the CHI St. Luke's Health system. Other affiliated teaching hospitals and research institutes include Harris Health System's Ben Taub Hospital, Texas Children's Hospital, The University of Texas MD Anderson Cancer Center, TIRR Memorial Hermann, the Menninger Clinic, the Michael E. DeBakey VA Medical Center, and the Children's Hospital of San Antonio. On November 18, 2020, Baylor College of Medicine announced a new affiliation with Baylor Scott & White Health. This will result in the development of a new regional medical school campus in Temple, Texas, which will enroll 40 students per year starting in fall 2023.

== History ==
The Baylor College of Medicine was originally founded in 1900 in Dallas, Texas, by a group of Dallas physicians as the University of Dallas Medical Department, despite the absence of any institution under the University of Dallas name. This occurred following a meeting of Dallas area physicians on August 16, 1900, for the purpose taking the preliminary steps to establish a medical college. The majority of physicians in attendance opposed the creation of a medical college; however, the remaining physicians in favor set up a committee of medical professional and three laymen to secure a board of directors for the proposed college.

The school's charter was filed with the Texas Secretary of State on September 15, 1900, with three physicians as the incorporators: Drs. Samuel E. Milliken, J. B. Titterington, and Lawrence Ashton. The school opened on November 19, 1900, with 81 students in a former synagogue, Temple Emanu-el, located at 292 Commerce Street (today 1306 Commerce Street).

In 1903, an alliance with Baylor University in Waco was formed and the name was changed to Baylor University College of Medicine.

By 1918, Baylor University College of Medicine was the only private medical school in Texas.

=== Relocation to Houston ===
The M.D. Anderson Foundation invited Baylor to join the newly formed Texas Medical Center in Houston in 1943. The school opened in the medical center July 12, 1943, in a converted Sears, Roebuck & Co. warehouse, with 131 students.Four years later, Baylor moved to its present site in the Roy and Lillie Cullen Building, the first building completed in the Texas Medical Center.

In 1948, Michael E. DeBakey joined the faculty as chair of the Department of Surgery, and the following year, the Graduate School of Biomedical Sciences was established. In the 1950s, Baylor University College of Medicine contributed to advances in vascular surgery through work by DeBakey and his colleagues, including the development of imrpoved Dacron vascular grafts. In 1964, the college expanded its physical facilities with the completion of Jesse H. Jones Hall, M. D. Anderson Hall, and the Jewish Institute for Medical Research.

=== Independence and expansion ===
In 1969, the college separated from Baylor University and became an independent institution, which allowed it access to federal research funding, changing its name to Baylor College of Medicine. Also in 1969, BCM negotiated with the Texas Legislature to double its class size in order to increase the number of physicians in Texas.

=== Disaffiliation from Houston Methodist Hospital ===
In 2004, Baylor did not renew its affiliation agreement with Houston Methodist Hospital, the school's primary private adult teaching hospital, following contentious discussions between the two institutions. This split is notable as the only instance in American medical history of a medical school and one of its primary teaching hospitals parting ways.

=== Recent history ===
In 2005, Baylor College of Medicine began building a hospital and clinic, to be called the Baylor Clinic and Hospital, slated to open in 2011. In 2009, the college postponed construction for financial reasons, with the outer shell of the hospital completed but the interiors remaining unfinished. In March 2012, BCM decided to convert the building to an outpatient clinic center. In 2009, BCM entered into discussions with Rice University regarding a potential merger between the two Houston institutions.After extensive meetings, the boards at both institutions decided that each school would remain independent.In 2010, Baylor University entered into talks with BCM to strengthen ties to each other; however, the merger did not occur.The Baylor University Board of Regents appoints 25% of the Baylor College of Medicine's board of trustees.

On June 21, 2010, Paul Klotman was named as the president and CEO of the Baylor College of Medicine.

In January 2014, BCM and CHI St. Luke's announced they would become joint owners of Baylor St. Luke's Medical Center, a hospital at the Texas Medical Center (formerly known as St. Luke's Episcopal Hospital, then St. Luke's Medical Center after it was purchased by Catholic Health Initiatives in 2013). A partially completed hospital building on the BCM–McNair Campus is slated to open in 2015 and will become BCM's acute-care hospital and main medical teaching facility.

On November 18, 2020, Baylor College of Medicine announced a new affiliation with Baylor Scott & White Health that will result in the development of a new regional medical school campus in Temple, Texas which will enroll 40 students per year starting in fall 2023.

== Reputation ==
Baylor College of Medicine ranked among the top 25 graduate programs in Biological Sciences in the United States according to the 2022 US News & World Report rankings. Within the School of Health Professions, the Nurse anesthetist program ranked second and the physician assistant program ranked third.

== School of Medicine ==
Each year the medical school matriculates around 185 students, around 75% of whom are Texas residents. As of April 2020, Baylor College of Medicine is the third least expensive private medical school in the country in terms of tuition.

=== Curriculum ===
The MD curriculum consists of 1.5 years of preclinical foundational sciences, followed by 2.5 years of clinical curriculum.

It is one of the few medical schools in the United States that is structured with an accelerated 1.5 year preclinical curriculum.

=== Dual degree programs ===
Baylor offers four programs that give medical students the opportunity to earn a second degree alongside the Doctor of Medicine (MD) degree.

- MD/PhD with the Graduate School of Biomedical Sciences
- MD/MPH with the UTHealth School of Public Health
- MD/MBA with the Rice University Jesse H. Jones School of Business
- MD/JD with the University of Houston Law Center

Baylor College of Medicine is one of only 51 medical institutions in the United States to offer a Medical Scientist Training Program. This federally sponsored and highly competitive program allows well-qualified students to study for a combined MD and Ph.D. in a medical science to be earned in 7–9 total years. Typically, 8–12 students matriculate into this program per year and receive free tuition in addition to a stipend of $29,000 per academic year.

== Graduate School of Biomedical Sciences ==
The Graduate School of Biomedical Sciences (GSBS) offers Ph.D. degrees in seven interdisciplinary specializations. It also offers a Master of Science degree and post-baccalaureate certificate program as well as two physician scientist training programs.

Overall, in 2024 BCM ranked 20th in terms of research funding from the National Institutes of Health based on rankings done by the Blue Ridge Institute.

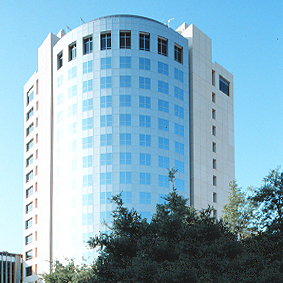
Baylor College of Medicine (BCM)

== School of Health Professions ==
=== Physician Assistant ===
The School's Physician Assistant Program which began in 1971 as a certificate program, was elevated to Bachelor of Science status in 1975, and on to a Master of Science program in 1989. Today, this program ranks 3rd among the nation's physician assistant programs according to U.S. News & World Report.

=== Nurse Anesthesia ===
The 2012 graduates of the Graduate Program in Nurse Anesthesia Program were the first to earn their doctorate of nursing practice from the Program. Developed from a 1968 a certificate program that was offered by the Harris County Hospital District, now the Harris Health System, in 1983, it became a Master of Science degree program under the auspices of Baylor. This program ranks 2nd in the nation among training programs in nurse anesthesia according to U.S. News & World Report.

=== Orthotics and Prosethetics ===
The Orthotics and Prosthetics Program welcomed its first students in June 2013. It is a 30-month program, where the first 12 months are dedicated to the didactic curriculum, and the following 18 months are spent on clinical rotations and research. It Is the only program in the country to integrate a series of full-time clinical rotations exposing students to six core areas of expertise designed to meet the requirements of the NCOPE-approved residency.

=== Genetic Counseling ===
In 2018, the Genetic Counseling Program welcomed its first students. It is a 21-month program consisting of didactic coursework, clinical rotations, and a student thesis. Genetic counseling students rotate through prenatal, pediatric, adult, cancer, and specialty clinics at Baylor College of Medicine and its affiliated hospitals in and around the Texas Medical Center.

=== Clinical Psychology Doctoral Program ===
The Clinical Psychology Ph.D. program is a five-year program that follows the scientist-practitioner approach and consists of a didactic curriculum, clinical practica in Years 2-4, and a predoctoral internship in Year 5. Students focus on one of three areas of emphasis—general clinical psychology, clinical neuropsychology or clinical health psychology—and receive research and clinical training from faculty across the college and affiliate hospitals in the Texas Medical Center.

== Residency training ==
Baylor College of Medicine sponsors Graduate Medical Education in more than 80 ACGME-accredited, and 40 Texas Medical Board (TMB)-approved training programs. At the college, residents and fellows learn in one of the most diverse cities in the United States.

== Research ==
=== Biomedical research ===
In 2013, Baylor College of Medicine ranked 19th in terms of research funding from the National Institutes of Health based on rankings done by the Blue Ridge Institute.

=== Conservation research ===
In July 2024, the first-ever mRNA vaccine for elephant endotheliotropic herpesvirus (EEHV), developed by Baylor College of Medicine, the Houston Zoo, and Colossal Biosciences, was successfully administered to an asian elephant.

== Hospital affiliations ==
Major BCM teaching hospitals
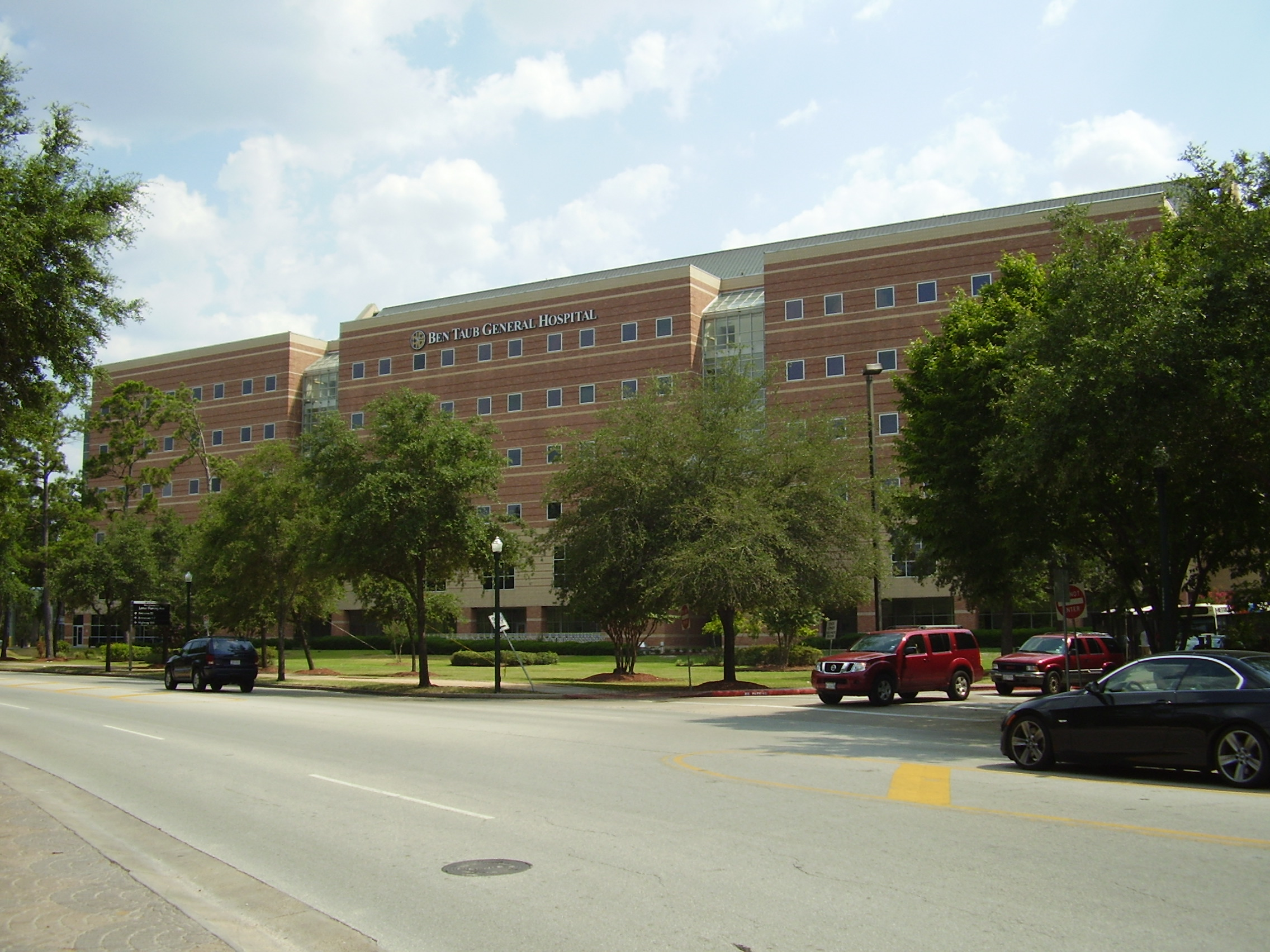
Ben Taub Hospital

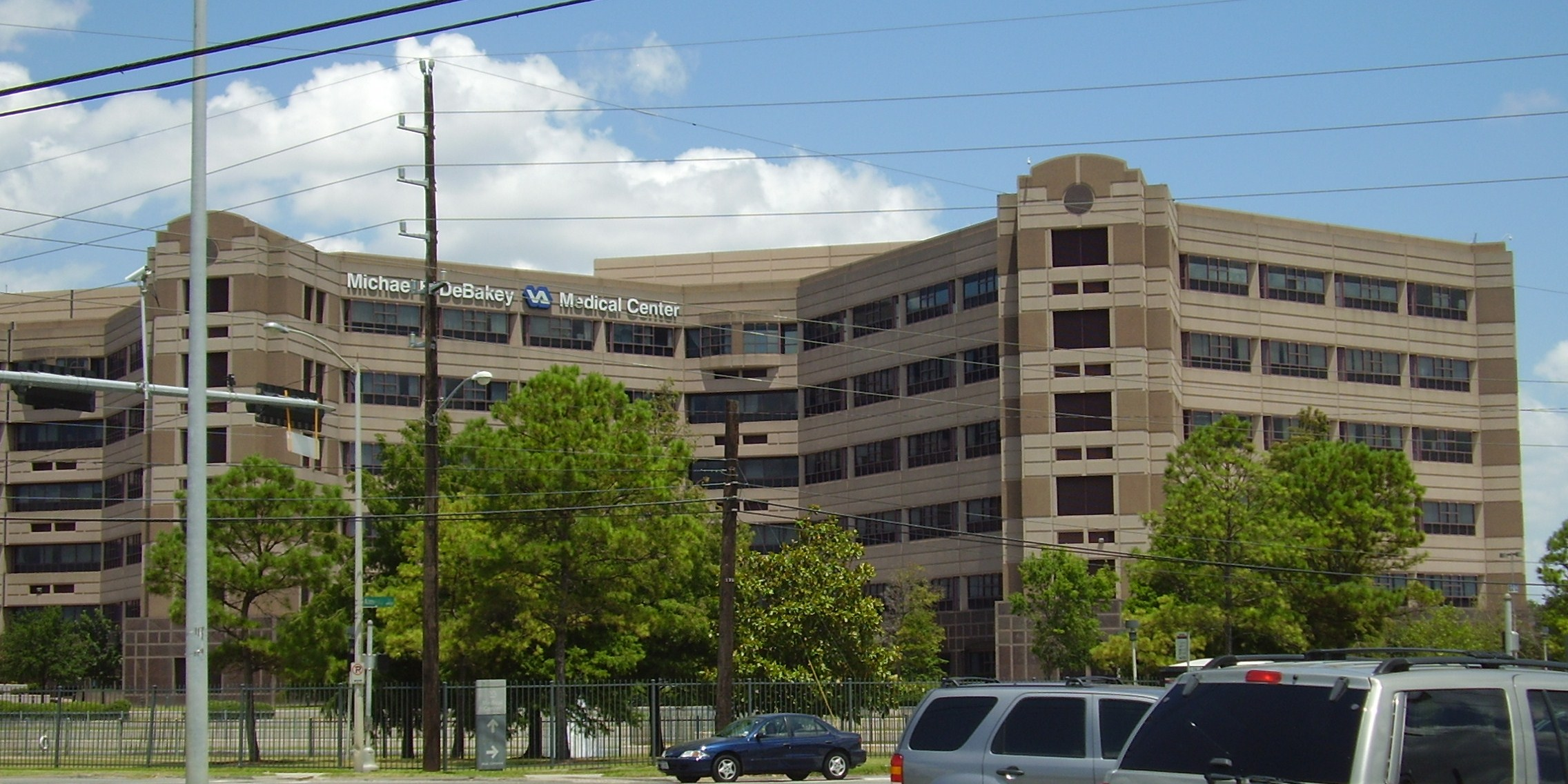
DeBakey VA Medical Center

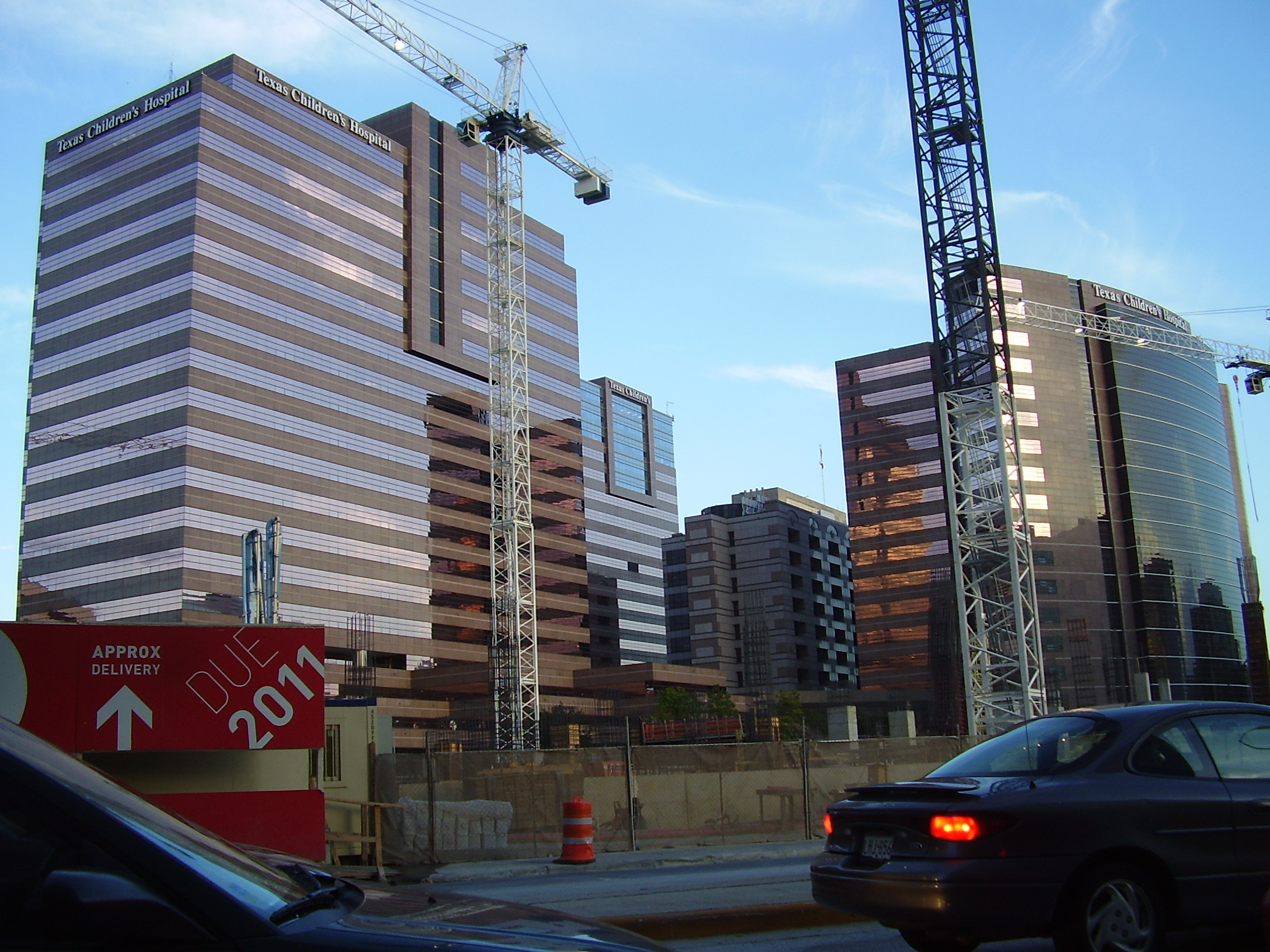
Texas Children's Hospital

BCM is affiliated with many of the hospitals of the Texas Medical Center. BCM's affiliations include:

Name	Type	Beds	Opened	Affiliation date	Trauma center	Notes
Baylor St. Luke's Medical Center	Adult, Private	850	1954	1961	n/a	50/50 ownership between Baylor College of Medicine and Catholic Health Initiatives
Texas Children's Hospital	Pediatric, Private	973	1954	1954	Level I, Pediatric	Largest pediatric hospital in the country
Children's Hospital of San Antonio	Pediatric, Private	194	1959	2013	Level III, Pediatric	
Harris Health Ben Taub Hospital	Adult, Public	586	1963	1963	Level I	
The University of Texas MD Anderson Cancer Center	Cancer	681	1941		n/a	Largest cancer center in the country
The Menninger Clinic	Psychiatric	120	1919	2003	n/a	Originally located in Topeka, Kansas. Relocated to Houston in June 2003.
TIRR - Memorial Hermann	Rehabilitation	134	1951	1951	n/a	Opened as Southwestern Poliomyelitis Respiratory Center, an annex to Jefferson Davis Hospital
Michael E. DeBakey VA Medical Center	Adult, Veterans Affairs	535	1945	1949	n/a	
Baylor Scott & White Medical Center - Temple	Adult, Private	636	1904	2020	Level I	

== Notable faculty members ==
- Sharmila Anandasabapathy, MD — Gastroenterologist, global health
- Oluwatoyin Asojo, PhD — Crystallographer, tropical medicine
- John C. Baldwin, MD — Cardiovascular surgeon. First successful heart "auto-transplantation" to repair a cardiac tumor
- Andrea Ballabio, MD — Geneticist
- Arthur L. Beaudet, M.D. — Geneticist, member of the National Academy of Sciences.
- Christine Beeton, PhD — Immunologist
- Hugo J. Bellen — Developmental biologist; Howard Hughes Medical investigator.
- Malcolm Brenner, MD, PhD. Geneticist.
- William "Bill" R. Brinkley — Cell biologist and early contributor to discovery of mitotic spindle apparatus
- William E. Brownell, PhD — Biophysicist, researcher into mammalian hearing
- F. Charles Brunicardi, MD — Surgeon. Editor-in-Chief of Schwartz's Principles of Surgery
- Nathan Bryan — Industrial researcher and adjunct assistant professor
- Janet S. Butel, PhD — Molecular virologist
- Selma Calmes, MD — Anesthesiologist.
- C. Thomas Caskey — Internist, geneticist and biomedical entrepreneur. Discovered/investigated universality of the genetic code and its stop/start mechanism. Howard Hughes Medical Investigator.
- Wah Chiu, PhD — Biophysicist
- Denton Cooley, MD — Cardiovascular surgeon. Innovations include aortic aneurysm repair, heart valve replacement, bloodless cardiac surgery for Jehovah's Witnesses, 1st successful implantation of artificial heart. Founder of the Texas Heart Institute. Winner, Presidential Medal of Freedom.
- Michael E. DeBakey, MD — Cardiovascular surgeon. Innovations include coronary bypass, carotid endarterectomy, artificial heart, ventricular assist device, aortic aneurysm repair. Winner, Presidential Medal of Freedom, National Medal of Science, Congressional Gold Medal.
- David Eagleman, PhD — Neuroscientist, popular writer
- Hashem El-Serag, MD — Internist and gastroenterologist
- Ralph Feigin, MD — Pediatrician (infectious diseases). Editor-in-Chief, Textbook of Pediatric Infectious Diseases
- Charles Fraser, MD — Pediatric surgeon
- O. H. Frazier, MD — Cardiovascular surgeon (heart transplants).
- Glen Gabbard, MD — Psychiatrist and psychoanalyst
- Richard A. Gibbs, PhD — Geneticist
- Margaret Goodell, PhD — Cancer biologist (stem cells)
- Wayne Goodman, MD — Psychiatrist. Co-developer, Yale–Brown Obsessive Compulsive Scale
- Helen Heslop, MD — Hematologist/Oncologist. Director of the Center for Cell and Gene Therapy
- David C. Hilmers, MD, MS, MPH — Astronaut, internist, pediatrician
- Donald Holmquest, MD, PhD, JD — Astronaut, radiologist (nuclear medicine), attorney
- Peter Hotez, MD, PhD — Pediatrician (infectious diseases), tropical medicine
- Mohit Khera — F. Brantley Scott Chair in Urology.
- Mark Kline, MD — Pediatrician (infectious diseases, HIV/AIDS).
- Peter H. Lin, MD — Cardiovascular surgeon
- James R. Lupski, MD, PhD — Molecular geneticist. Co-discoverer, Potocki-Lupski syndrome
- Kenneth Mattox, MD — Surgeon
- Elizabeth McIngvale, PhD — Social worker (OCD advocate) and daughter of furniture magnate Jim McIngvale
- Read Montague, PhD — Neuroscientist
- Daniel Musher — Microbiologist.
- David L. Nelson, PhD — Cancer researcher
- Bert W. O'Malley — Geneticist. National Medal of Science winner. Member, National Academy of Sciences.
- C. Kent Osborne, MD — Oncologist.
- David Poplack, MD — Pediatric oncologist.
- Lorraine Potocki, PhD — Medical geneticist. Co discoverer, Potocki-Lupski syndrome and Potocki-Shaffer syndrome
- Michael J. Reardon, MD — Cardiovascular surgeon. First successful cardiac auto transplantation for cardiac sarcoma.
- JoAnne S. Richards, PhD — Cell biologist (ovarian cancer). Member, American Academy of Arts and Sciences
- Jeffrey M. Rosen, PhD — Breast cancer researcher. Distinguished service professor and Fellow of the AAAS
- Susan M. Rosenberg, PhD — Cancer researcher (DNA mutations)
- Kevin Slawin, MD — Urologist
- David Sugarbaker, MD — Cardiovascular surgeon
- Huda Zoghbi — Neuropsychiatrist. Member of National Academy of Sciences; Howard Hughes investigator
- Blaž Zupan, PhD — Computer scientist

== Notable alumni ==
- Christopher Amos, PhD — Genetic epidemiologist (cancer)
- Carl June, M.D. — Hematologist/Oncologist, cell therapy pioneer, clinical inventor of CAR T-cell therapy and perennial Nobel Prize in physiology or medicine candidate
- J. Morgan Micheletti — Ophthalmologist, researcher, and inventor

== Affiliated schools ==
- Michael E. DeBakey High School for Health Professions
- Baylor College of Medicine Academy at Ryan
- Baylor College of Medicine Biotech Academy at Rusk
