= Sharmila =

- Gender: Female
- Language: Hindi; Sanskrit; Tamil

Origin
- Meaning: "shy" "comfort" "joy" "protection" "happiness"
- Region of origin: India

Other names
- Related names: Sarmila, Sharmiela

Sharmila (Hindi : शर्मिला) is a Hindu/Sanskrit Indian popular feminine given name, which means "comfort", "joy" and"protection".

== Notable people named Sharmila ==
- Sharmila Anandasabapathy, Sri Lankan-American physician
- Sharmila Bhattacharya (born 1964), American-Nigerian doctor and NASA scientist
- Sharmila Biswas (born 1962), Indian dancer and choreographer
- Sharmila Chakraborty (born 1961), Indian cricketer
- Sharmila Devar (born 1977), American actress
- Sharmila Farooqi (born 1978), Pakistani politician
- Sharmila M. Mukhopadhyay, Indian professor of material science
- Sharmila Nicollet (born 1991), French-Indian golfer
- Sharmila Rege (1964–2013), Indian sociologist, feminist and writer
- Irom Chanu Sharmila (born 1972), Indian poet, political and civil rights activist
- Sharmila Tagore (born 1944), Indian actress
- Y. S. Sharmila (born 1973), Indian politician

== Notable people named Sarmila ==
- Sarmila Bose (born 1959), Harvard Academic

== Notable people named Sharmiela ==
- Sharmiela Mandre (born 1989), Indian actress
