= Nathan Bryan =

Nathan Bryan may refer to:

- Nathan Bryan (North Carolina politician) (1748–1798), U.S. congressman from North Carolina
- Nathan P. Bryan (1872–1935), lawyer, federal judge, and U.S. senator from Florida
- Nathan Bryan (scientist) (born 1973), American biologist
