= Michael Reardon =

Michael Reardon may refer to:

- Michael Reardon (climber) (1965–2007), American climber, filmmaker and writer
- Michael Reardon (actor), foreign actor who starred in The Syndicate: A Death in the Family (1970)
- Michael Reardon (architect), English architect, historic building consultant and interior designer
- Michael Reardon (activist) (1876–1945), political activist
- Michael J. Reardon, American cardiac surgeon and medical researcher
