= SMCR2 =

Non-coding RNA found in humans

Identifiers
- Aliases: SMCR2, TCONS_00025215, Smith-Magenis syndrome chromosome region, candidate 2 (non-protein coding), Smith-Magenis syndrome chromosome region, candidate 2
- External IDs: GeneCards: SMCR2

Gene location (Human)
Chr.	Chromosome 17 (human)
Band	17p11.2	Start	17,674,026 bp
Band	17p11.2	End	17,677,688 bp
RNA expression pattern
Bgee	Human / Mouse (ortholog); Top expressed in: gonad; testicle; ventricular zone; ganglionic eminence; muscle of thigh; sural nerve; islet of Langerhans; prefrontal cortex; left testis; right testis / n/a; More reference expression data
BioGPS	n/a
Orthologs
Databases	NCBI: entry; OMA: entry
Species	Human	Mouse
Entrez	105371564	n/a
Ensembl	ENSG00000223979	n/a
UniProt	n a	n/a
RefSeq (mRNA)	n/a	n/a
RefSeq (protein)	n/a	n/a
Location (UCSC)	Chr 17: 17.67 – 17.68 Mb	n/a
PubMed search		n/a
- Wikidata
View/Edit Human

In molecular biology, Smith-Magenis syndrome chromosome region, candidate 2 (non-protein coding), also known as SMCR2, is a long non-coding RNA. In humans, it is found in a region of chromosome 17 that is commonly deleted in Smith–Magenis syndrome.

== See also ==
- Long non-coding RNA
