= Potocki–Lupski syndrome =

- Other names: 17p11.2 microduplication syndrome, Trisomy 17p11.2
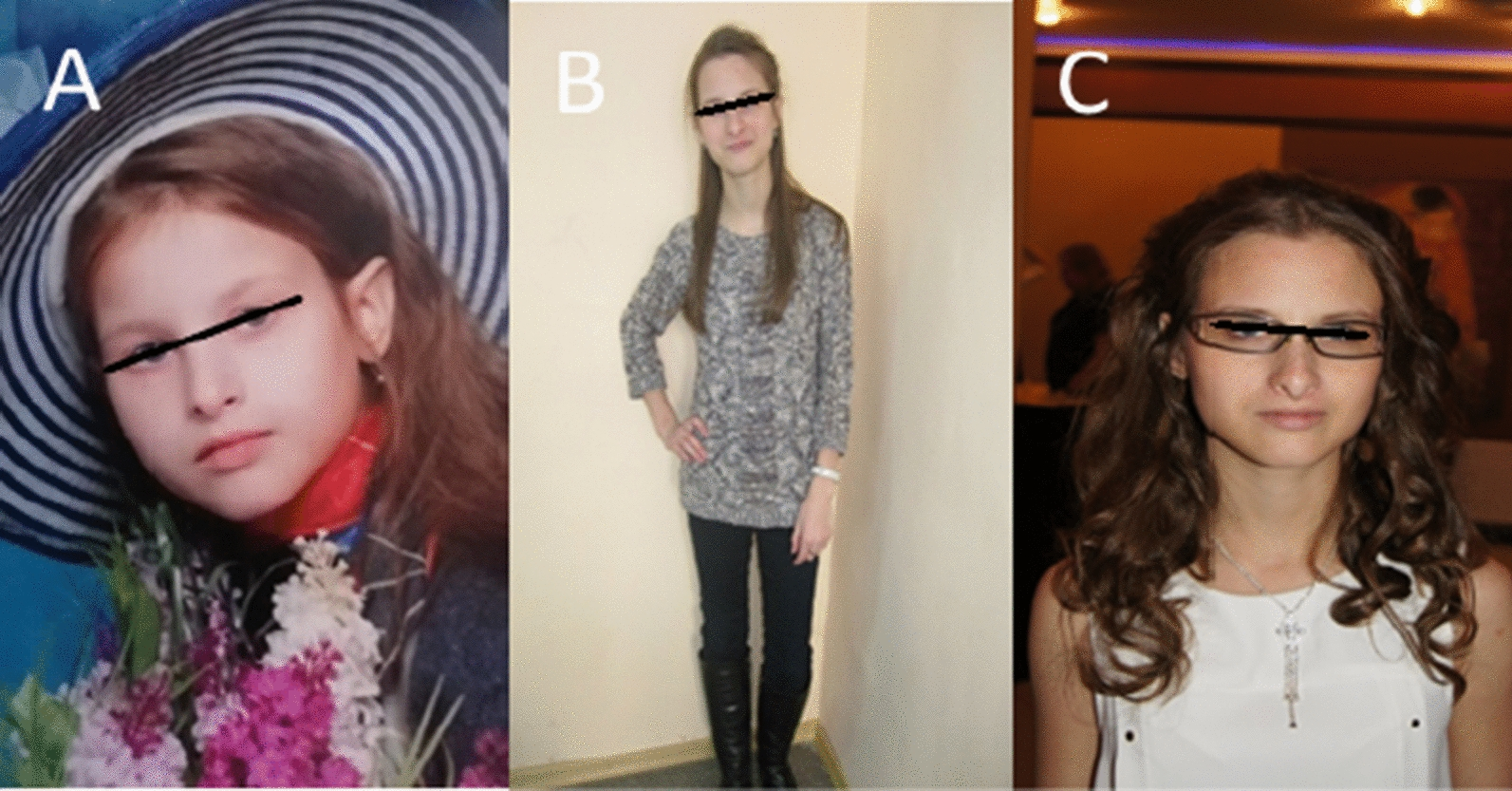
- This illustration shows patient with Potocki–Lupski syndrome (Duplication 17p11.2 Syndrome), with typical facial features such as: downslanting palpebral fissures, broad forehead, pointed nose tip, triangular face, hypertelorism.

Potocki–Lupski syndrome (PTLS), also known as dup(17)p11.2p11.2 syndrome, trisomy 17p11.2 or duplication 17p11.2 syndrome, is a contiguous gene syndrome involving the microduplication of band 11.2 on the short arm of human chromosome 17 (17p11.2). The duplication was first described as a case study in 1996. In 2000, the first study of the disease was released, and in 2007, enough patients had been gathered to complete a comprehensive study and give it a detailed clinical description. PTLS is named for two researchers involved in the latter phases, Drs. Lorraine Potocki and James R. Lupski of Baylor College of Medicine.

PTLS was the first predicted reciprocal of a homologous recombination (microdeletion or microduplication) where both reciprocal recombinations result in a contiguous gene syndrome. Its reciprocal disease is Smith–Magenis syndrome (SMS), in which the chromosome portion duplicated in PTLS is deleted altogether.

Potocki–Lupski syndrome is considered a rare disease, predicted to appear in at least 1 in 20,000 humans.

Symptoms of the syndrome include intellectual disability, autism (though some cases report no ASD symptoms), and other disorders unrelated to the listed symptoms.

== Presentation ==
Clinically, PTLS presents as a milder syndrome than SMS, with distinct characteristics, though PTLS can be mistaken for SMS. Both syndromes are characterized by multiple congenital abnormalities and intellectual disability. A key feature which appears in 80% of cases is autism spectrum disorder. Other unique features of Potocki–Lupski syndrome include infantile hypotonia, sleep apnea, structural cardiovascular anomalies, cognitive deficits, abnormal social behaviors, learning disabilities, attention-deficit disorder, obsessive-compulsive behaviours, malocclusions, short stature and failure to thrive.

After noting that autism is commonly associated with PTLS, researchers at the Centro de Estudios Científicos and the Austral University of Chile genetically engineered a PTLS "model mouse" where the syntenic chromosome segment was duplicated, and examined the social behaviours of these mice versus those without the anomaly (the "wild-type"). One human autism-related symptom is abnormal reciprocal social interaction. The researchers observed that the genetically-engineered mice of both sexes had a slight (statistically insignificant) impairment of their preference of a social target (i.e., a living, breathing mouse) over an inanimate one — the average human will prefer the social target — and preferred to explore newly introduced mice instead of familiar ones, unlike the typical human and mouse preference of a friend over a stranger, demonstrating a change in their liking of social novelty. They also found that male mice, in some scenarios, showed increased anxiety and dominant behaviour than the control group. Anatomically, the engineered mice had a decreased brain-to-body mass ratio and an alteration in the expression of several genes in the hippocampus.

== Molecular genetics ==
Both Potocki–Lupski and Smith–Magenis syndromes arise through a faulty non-allelic homologous recombination mechanism. Both appear to involve a 1.3-3.7Mb chromosome section in 17p11.2 that includes the retinoic acid inducible 1 (RAI1) gene. Other candidate genes have been identified within the duplicated section, including SREBF1, DRG2, LLGL1, SHMT1 and ZFP179.

In mice of the subfamily Murinae, a 32-34cM region of chromosome 11 is syntenic to 17p11.2, meaning that they contain the same genes in the same order and orientation. This conserved sequence has been exploited to learn more about SMS and PTLS. Through genetic studies on both laboratory mice and humans, it has been discovered that RAI1 is likely the gene responsible for these syndromes. For example, in one study, it was shown that mice with 2 copies of the RAI1 gene and 3 copies of each of the other 18 genes in the described translocated region of chromosome 11 appeared and behaved like the control mice with the described region intact. In other words, RAI1 is dosage-sensitive. This provides evidence that it is the number of RAI1 copies present that affects the symptoms of PTLS and SMS. It is therefore believed that RAI1 is the critical gene involved in these disorders; however, since no cases of RAI1 duplication alone have been identified, this has not been concluded.

One group has noted that, in a mouse model, the flanking genes in the duplicated segment were also overexpressed, suggesting some new candidates for analysis, including MFAP4, TTC19 and GJA12.

== Diagnosis ==
The duplication involved in PTLS is usually large enough to be detected through G-banding alone, though there is a high false negative rate. To ascertain the diagnosis when karyotyping results are unclear or negative, more sophisticated techniques such as subtelomeric fluorescent in-situ hybridization analysis and array comparative genomic hybridization (aCGH) may be used.

== See also ==
- Chromosome nomenclature
- Low copy repeats
