= Butel (disambiguation) =

Butel is a neighbourhood in Skopje, North Macedonia, the seat of Butel Municipality.

Notable people with the surname Butel include:

- Anaïg Butel (born 1992), French football player, sister of Gwenaëlle Butel
- Jane Butel, American cook and food writer
- Janet S. Butel, American virologist
- Michel Butel (1940–2018), French journalist and novelist
- Mitchell Butel (born 1970), Australian actor
- Philip Butel (born 1980), Filipino basketball player
