= Micheletti =

Micheletti is an Italian surname, derived from the given name Michele. Notable people with the surname include:

- Andrea Micheletti (born 1991), Italian rower
- Felipe Micheletti (born 1990), Brazilian professional kickboxer and mixed martial artist
- J. Morgan Micheletti, American ophthalmologist
- Joe Micheletti (born 1954), American ice hockey analyst and former player
- Luisa Micheletti (born 1983), Brazilian presenter
- Pat Micheletti (born 1963), American ice hockey player
- Pietro Micheletti (1900–2005), Italian soldier
- Roberto Micheletti (born 1943), Honduran politician, de facto President of Honduras for seven months in 2009–2010, following the 2009 Honduran coup d'etat

== See also ==
- Estadio Humberto Micheletti, a multi-use stadium in El Progreso, Honduras
