= University of the Mediterranean =

French university active 1969 to 2012

University of the Mediterranean Aix-Marseille II
- Université de la Méditerranée, Aix-Marseille II
- Type: Public
- Active: 22 May 1969–1 January 2012
- President: Yvon Berland
- Students: 24,000
- Location: Aix-en-Provence, Gap and Marseille, France
- Website: https://web.archive.org/web/20100119053821/http://www.univmed.fr/ (in French)

The University of the Mediterranean Aix-Marseille II (Occitan: Universitat de la Mediterranèa Ais-Marselha) was a French university in the Academy of Aix and Marseille. Historically, it was part of the University of Aix-Marseille based across the communes of Aix-en-Provence and Marseille in southern France. On 1 January 2012 the Université de la Méditerranée merged with the University of Provence and Paul Cézanne University to become Aix-Marseille University.

== Academic programs ==
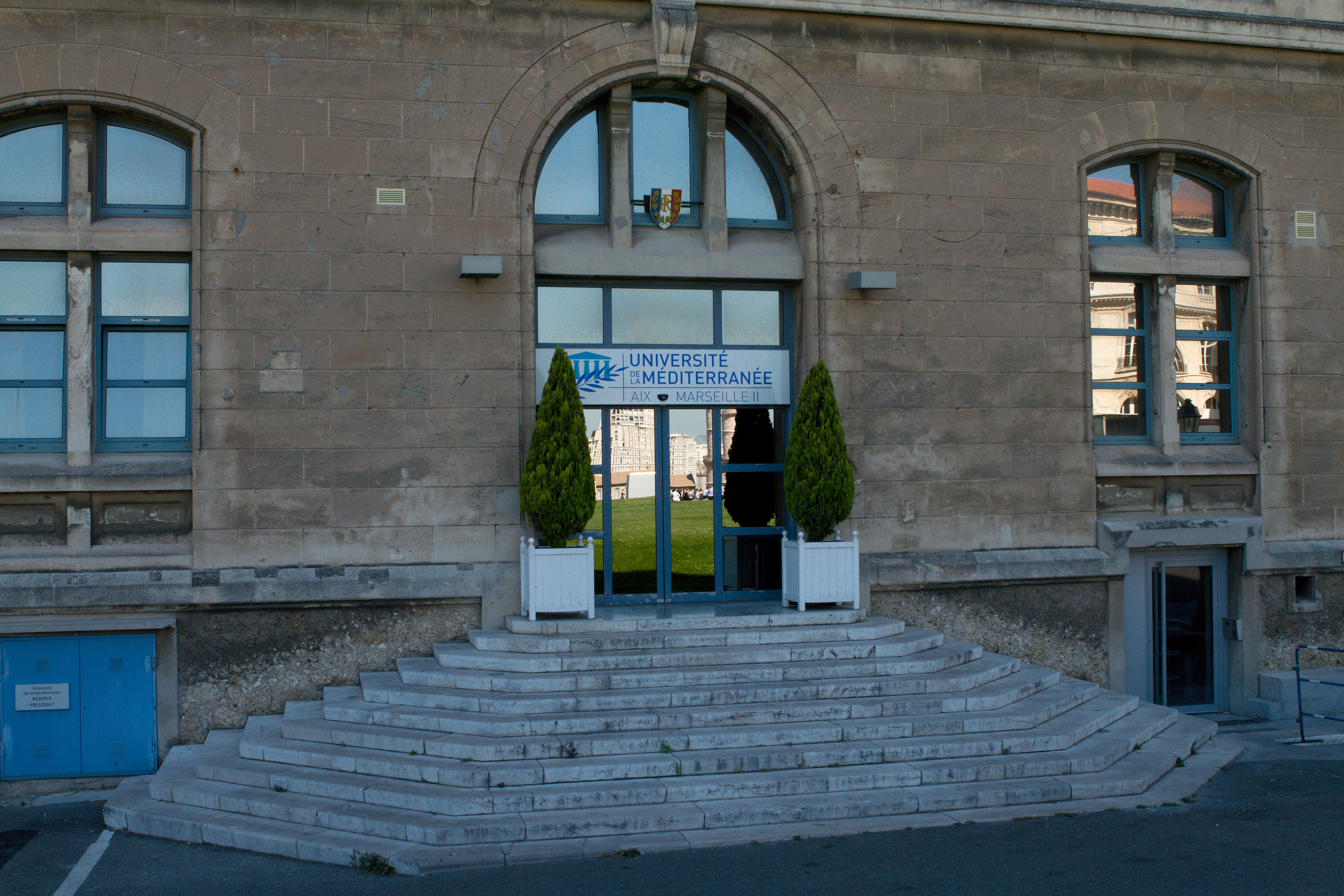

The university was particularly strong in sciences with faculties for science (Faculté des Sciences de Luminy), sport sciences (Faculté des Sciences du Sport), engineering (École supérieure d'ingénieurs de Luminy) and economic science and management (Faculté des Sciences Économiques et de Gestion). The medical school comprised the faculties of Medicine, Pharmacy and Dentistry.

In addition, there were a number of institutes:

- Institut de Mécanique de Marseille (Institute of mechanics at Marseille)
- École de Journalisme et de Communication (School of Journalism and Communications)
- Institut Universitaire de Technologie (University Institute for technology)
- Institut Régional du Travail (Regional institute for work)
- Centre d'océanologie de Marseille (Oceanography center of Marseille)
- Ecole Universitaire de Maïeutique Marseille Méditerranée

== History ==
The Université d'Aix-en-Provence was initially created in 1409 by Louis II de Provence. In 1791, like every university in France, it was dissolved and its faculties became autonomous and were dispersed between the cities of Aix-en-Provence and Marseille. On 21 April 1881 by decree of the conseil municipal (city council) the medical school was opened at the palais du Pharo by the Vieux Port in Marseille. In 1969, two universities were established between Aix-en-Provence and Marseille. In 1973, the third was created (Université d'Aix-Marseille III). In 1994, the Université d'Aix-Marseille II took the name of Université de la Méditerranée. On 1 January 2012 the Université de la Méditerranée merged with the University of Provence and Paul Cézanne University to become Aix-Marseille University.

== Alumni ==
- Xavier Laurent
- Christine Beeton

== See also ==
- University of Aix-Marseille
- List of public universities in France by academy
