= Ben Taub Hospital =

Hospital in Houston, Texas

Coordinates: 29°42′39″N 95°23′37″W

- Part of Harris Health System
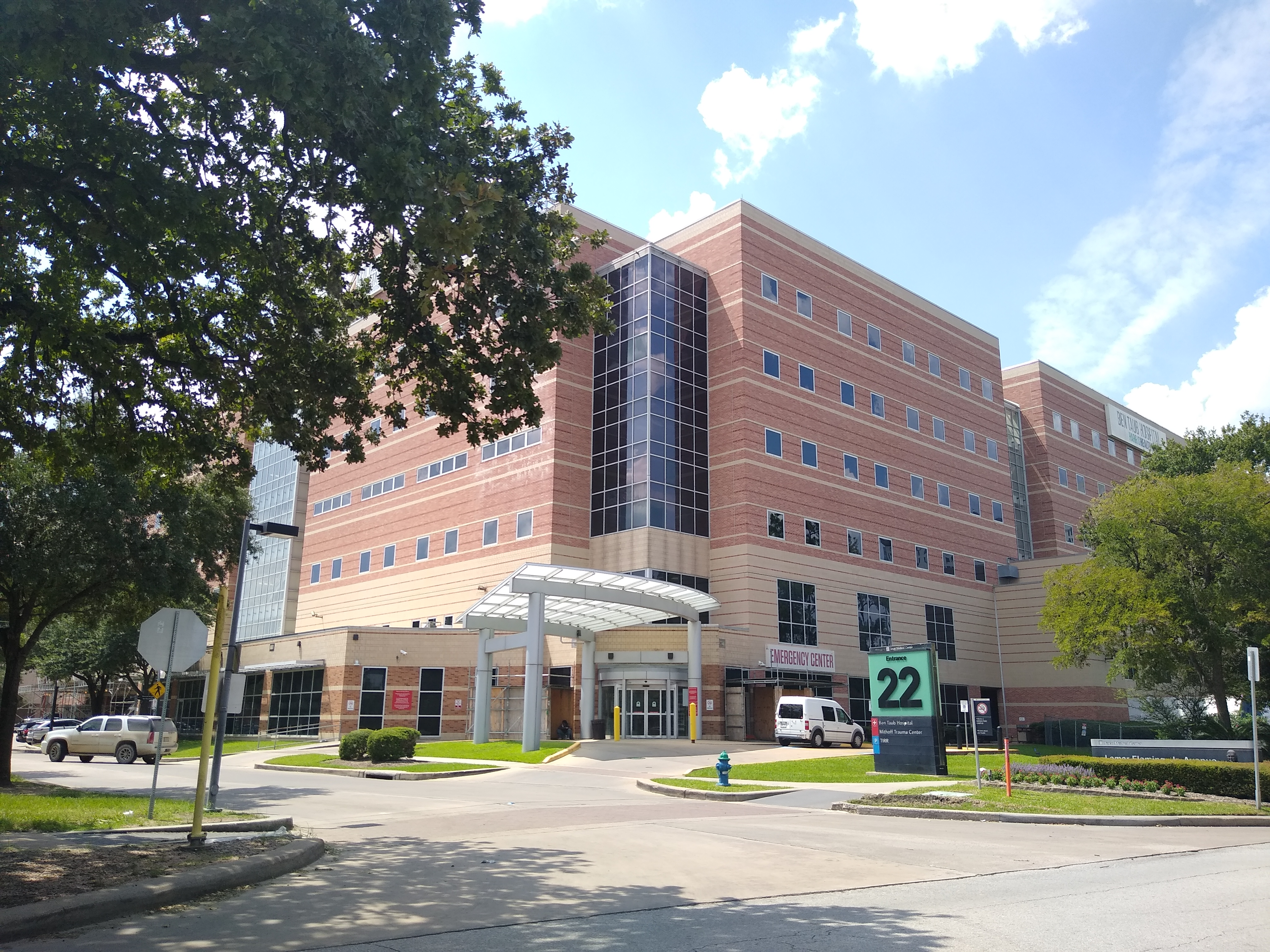

Geography
- Location: Texas Medical Center, Houston, Texas, United States

Organization
- Care system: Governmental
- Type: General and Teaching Hospital
- Affiliated university: Baylor College of Medicine, University of Texas Health Science Center at Houston, The University of Texas M. D. Anderson Cancer Center

Services
- Emergency department: Level I trauma center
- Beds: 586

History
- Founded: 1963

Links
- Website: http://www.harrishealth.org
- Lists: Hospitals in Texas

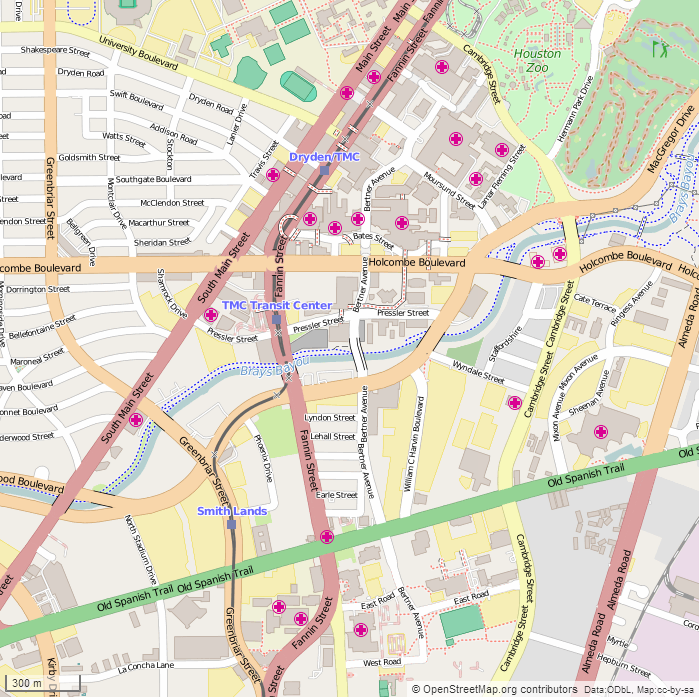
Location within Texas Medical Center

Ben Taub Hospital is a public hospital located in Houston, Texas, within the Texas Medical Center. Having opened in May 1963, the hospital is owned and operated by the Harris Health System and is staffed by the faculty, residents, and students from Baylor College of Medicine.

Ben Taub is a Level I trauma center, one of three in Southeast Texas, the others being nearby Memorial Hermann–Texas Medical Center and University of Texas Medical Branch in Galveston. Kenneth Mattox, a trauma surgeon named Best Doctor in America five times, is the head of the trauma department. With 409 licensed beds, it is one of the busiest trauma centers in the United States, caring for over 106,000 emergency patients during its last fiscal year (March 1, 2010 to February 28, 2011). Ben Taub is also the only hospital in Houston with a psychiatric emergency department open 24 hours a day. The hospital is named after Ben Taub (1889–1982), a real estate developer and businessman whose extensive behind-the-scenes philanthropic efforts helped transform Houston.

As of 1998 the hospital district designated much of the county, including central, southern, and western portions, to Ben Taub.

== History ==
The original Ben Taub hospital opened in May 1963 and was closed when the current Ben Taub opened on January 12, 1990. The hospital district intended to renovate the old Ben Taub and have two new additional hospitals opened, but the hospital district encountered financial difficulties in the 1990s. In 2012, the district announced that it will begin renovating the old Ben Taub for $38 million.

Circa 2004 about 4,200 square feet (390 m^{2}) of space was added to the emergency room area.

== Births ==
- Vanessa Guillén (murder victim)
