= Jeffrey M. Rosen =

American cancer researcher

- Occupation: Researcher

Jeffrey M. Rosen is an American cancer researcher.

== Education ==
Rosen earned a bachelor's degree from Williams College in 1966, and a doctorate at the University at Buffalo in 1970. He completed his postdoctoral fellowship at the Vanderbilt University School of Medicine in 1972.

== Career ==
He then joined the Baylor College of Medicine faculty in 1973. Rosen later held Baylor's Charles C. Bell Professorship in Molecular and Cellular Biology. In 2015, Rosen was elected a fellow of the American Association for the Advancement of Science.

In 2022, Rosen received the William L. McGuire Memorial Lecture Award. Rosen gave a lecture titled “Leveraging Preclinical Models for Translational Breast Cancer Research” during the symposium.
