= Christopher Amos =

American genetic epidemiologist

- Education: Reed College; Louisiana State University Medical Center
- Scientific career
- Fields: Genetic epidemiology
- Institutions: University of Texas MD Anderson Cancer Center; Geisel School of Medicine; Baylor College of Medicine
- Thesis: Robust methods for detection of genetic linkage for data from extended families and pedigrees (1988)
- Doctoral advisor: Robert C. Elston

Christopher Ian Amos is an American genetic epidemiologist and the director of the Institute for Clinical and Translational Research at Baylor College of Medicine, where he is also the associate director for quantitative science at the Dan L Duncan Comprehensive Cancer Center. He is known for his research on the genetic basis of certain types of human cancer.

== Biography ==
Amos was educated at Reed College, where he earned his undergraduate degree in mathematics in 1980, and at the Louisiana State University Medical Center, where he received his M.S. and Ph.D. degrees in 1985 and 1988, respectively. He joined the Department of Epidemiology at the University of Texas MD Anderson Cancer Center in 1992, where he founded the Section of Computational and Genetic Epidemiology. In 2012, he was named the inaugural chair of the Department of Biomedical Data Science at the Geisel School of Medicine at Dartmouth College. He became director of the Institute for Clinical and Translational Research at Baylor College of Medicine on November 1, 2017, after being offered a $6 million "established investigator" grant by the Cancer Prevention and Research Institute of Texas.
