= Kenneth Mattox =

American surgeon and author

Kenneth Mattox (born July 14, 1938) is an American surgeon and author.

== Education ==
Mattox graduated from Wayland Baptist University in 1960. He then matriculated to Baylor College of Medicine, graduating in 1964.

== Career ==
He is Professor and Vice Chairman of Surgery in the General Surgery Division of the Michael E. DeBakey Department of Surgery at Baylor College of Medicine. In addition, he is Chief of the Surgery Service and Chief of Staff at Ben Taub General Hospital. He is a veteran and served for one year in Alabama. He now specializes in thoracic surgery and trauma surgery. He has been named among the Best Surgeons in America five times.

For decades, he has organized the trauma conference Trauma, Critical Care and Acute Care Surgery at the Caesar's Palace casino in Las Vegas, a conference that attracts over 1000 surgeons from all over the world every year.

After three decades at Ben Taub, Mattox stepped down as the Chief of Staff in 2020.

== Honors ==
Mattox served as the President of the American Association for the Surgery of Trauma between 1995 and 1996.
