= F. Charles Brunicardi =

American physician (born 1954)

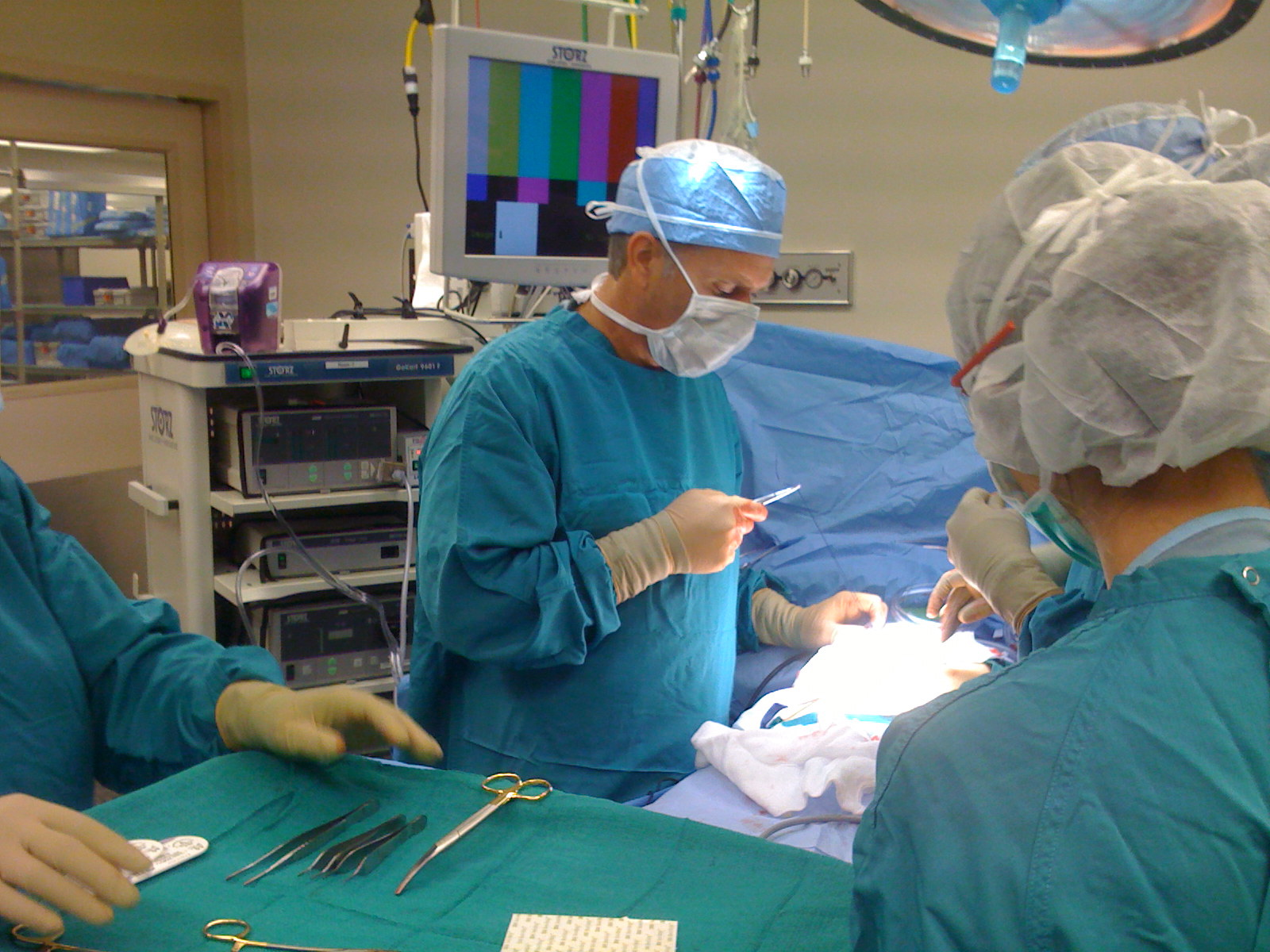
- F. Charles Brunicardi
- Born: May 10, 1954 (age 72); Perth Amboy, New Jersey, United States
- Education: Rutgers University School of Medicine

F. Charles Brunicardi (born May 10, 1954) is an American physician.

On July 1, 2011, Brunicardi rejoined the University of California, Los Angeles faculty as Moss Foundation Professor of Gastrointestinal and Personalized Surgery and Chief of General Surgery at the UCLA Medical Center, Santa Monica and a Vice Chairman of the Department of Surgery at the David Geffen School of Medicine at UCLA. He is currently the Senior Vice President and Dean of the College of Medicine at SUNY Downstate Health Sciences University.

== Early life and education ==
Brunicardi was born in Perth Amboy, New Jersey, on May 10, 1954. He attended Johns Hopkins University, graduating Phi Beta Kappa in 1976. He then attended Rutgers University School of Medicine in Piscataway, New Jersey. He is currently operating as Dean of the SUNY Downstate College of Medicine.

== Career ==
Upon graduation from Rutgers Medical School in 1980, Brunicardi served as a research assistant in the Department of Anesthesiology at Cornell University Medical Center in Manhattan, New York. Brunicardi interned in surgery at Mount Zion Hospital in San Francisco, California and was a surgical resident at SUNY Downstate Medical Center in Brooklyn, New York from 1982-1983. From 1983-1986 he was a fellow in research in the Department of Surgery at SUNY Health Science Center and won several national and international research awards. From 1986-1988 he was a Senior Resident in Surgery at SUNY, and from 1988-1989 he was the Chief Resident of General Surgery at SUNY Health Science Center.

Brunicardi, a gastrointestinal surgeon-scientist, was a member of the University of California, Los Angeles surgical faculty from 1989 to 1995, when he was recruited to Baylor College of Medicine in Houston, Texas as George Jordan Professor and Chief of General Surgery. In 1999, Brunicardi became DeBakey/Bard Professor and Chairman of the Michael E. DeBakey Department of Surgery at Baylor and held that position for 12 years before returning to UCLA. In December 2019, Brunicardi was named as Senior Vice President and Dean of the College of Medicine at SUNY Downstate Health Sciences University.

== Research interests and contributions ==
Brunicardi's research interests focus upon translational genomic medicine and surgery. His clinical areas of expertise include gastrointestinal surgery and surgery of neuroendocrine tumors. Brunicardi has held continuous research funding since 1992, and he has a vast bibliography with more than 270 publications and is the editor of a surgical textbook.
