= Lorraine Potocki =

American geneticist

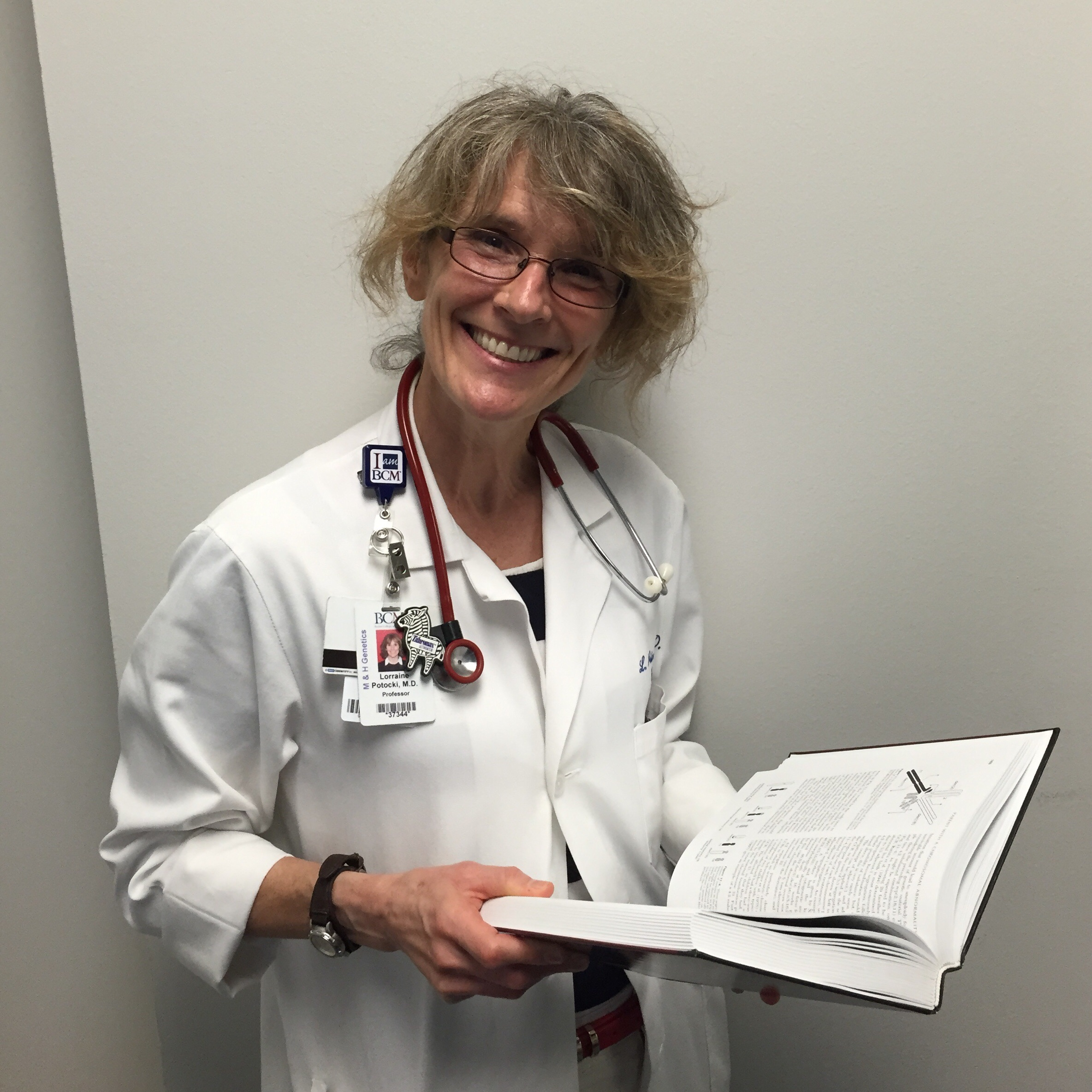
- Born: Lorraine Potocki; August 18, 1961 (age 65); Trenton, New Jersey
- Education: Boston University School of Medicine
- Occupation: Geneticist at Texas Children's Hospital
- Board member of: Clinical Pathology and Clinical Genetics

Lorraine Potocki (born August 18, 1961) is a medical geneticist and educator at Texas Children's Hospital and is a professor at Baylor College of Medicine.

She is credited with the discovery of two genetic syndromes, Potocki-Lupski syndrome and Potocki-Shaffer syndrome.
