= DRG2 =

Protein-coding gene in the species Homo sapiens

Identifiers
- Aliases: DRG2, developmentally regulated GTP binding protein 2
- External IDs: OMIM: 602986; MGI: 1342307; HomoloGene: 1061; GeneCards: DRG2; OMA:DRG2 - orthologs

Gene location (Human)
Chr.	Chromosome 17 (human)
Band	17p11.2	Start	18,087,892 bp
Band	17p11.2	End	18,107,970 bp

Gene location (Mouse)
Chr.	Chromosome 11 (mouse)
Band	11 B2|11 37.81 cM	Start	60,345,417 bp
Band	11 B2|11 37.81 cM	End	60,359,580 bp
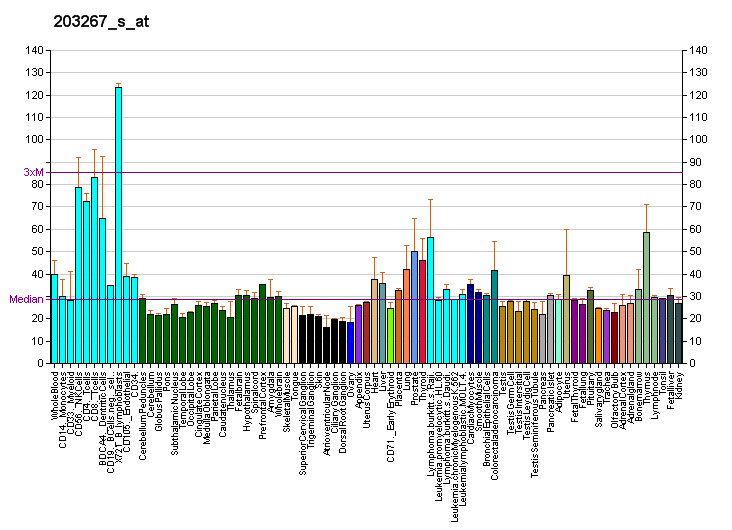

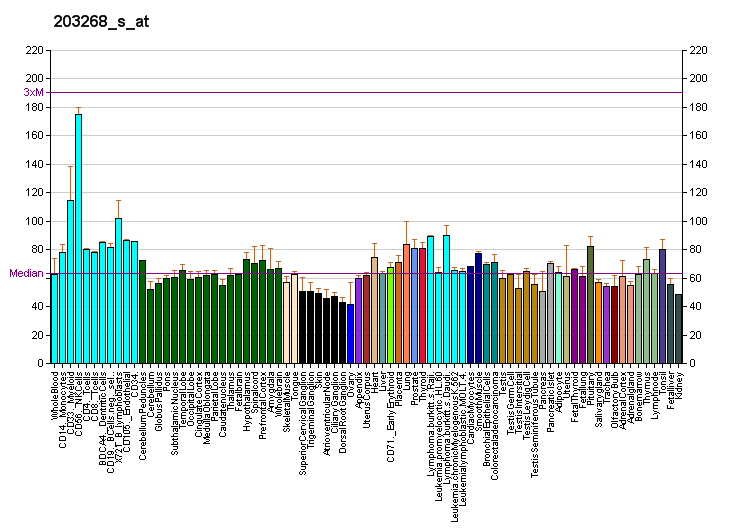
RNA expression pattern
Bgee	Human / Mouse (ortholog); Top expressed in: granulocyte; right lobe of liver; anterior pituitary; apex of heart; body of uterus; gastrocnemius muscle; right ovary; right lobe of thyroid gland; left ovary; canal of the cervix / Top expressed in: otic vesicle; morula; neural layer of retina; internal carotid artery; otic placode; external carotid artery; saccule; tail of embryo; epiblast; ventricular zone; More reference expression data
BioGPS	More reference expression data
Gene ontology
Molecular function	nucleotide binding; GTP binding; protein binding; RNA binding; GTPase activity; hydrolase activity; metal ion binding
Cellular component	membrane; mitochondrion; intracellular membrane-bounded organelle; nucleoplasm; cytoplasm; cytosol; nucleus
Biological process	signal transduction; cytoplasmic translation
Sources:Amigo / QuickGO
Orthologs
Species	Human	Mouse
Entrez	1819	13495
Ensembl	ENSG00000108591	ENSMUSG00000020537
UniProt	P55039	Q9QXB9
RefSeq (mRNA)	NM_001388; NM_001330144	NM_021354
RefSeq (protein)	NP_001317073; NP_001379	NP_067329
Location (UCSC)	Chr 17: 18.09 – 18.11 Mb	Chr 11: 60.35 – 60.36 Mb
PubMed search
- Wikidata
View/Edit Human	View/Edit Mouse

Developmentally-regulated GTP-binding protein 2 is a protein that in humans is encoded by the DRG2 gene.

The DRG2 gene encodes the developmentally regulated GTP-binding protein 2, a name derived from the fact that it shares significant similarity to known GTP-binding proteins. DRG2 was identified because it is expressed in normal fibroblasts but not in SV40-transformed fibroblasts. Read-through transcripts containing this gene and a downstream gene have been identified, but they are not thought to encode a fusion protein. This gene is located within the Smith-Magenis syndrome region on chromosome 17.
