= Mohit Khera =

American medical doctor and academic

Dr Mohit Khera
- Occupation: Professor
- Website: https://www.drmohitkhera.com/

Mohit Khera is an American medical doctor and academic known for his work in male and female sexual dysfunction and testosterone replacement therapy. He currently holds the F. Brantley Scott Chair in Urology at Baylor College of Medicine. He is also the President of the Sexual Medicine Society of North America. His research focuses on male infertility, sexual dysfunction, and declining testosterone levels in aging men. Among his contributions to the field, he has investigated methods for treating Peyronie's disease as well as helped set the AUA Guideline for the clinic strategy.
