= Christine Beeton =

Immunologist

Dr. Christine Beeton
- Citizenship: United States
- Education: Université de la Mediterranée
- Occupations: Immunologist, professor

Christine Beeton is an immunologist and associate professor at the Baylor College of Medicine (Baylor or Baylor College) in Houston, Texas. She works within the Department of Molecular Physiology and Biophysics. Beeton graduated from the Faculté des Sciences de Luminy within the Université de la Mediterranée in Marseille, France and later as a postdoctoral fellow from the University of California. Her professional interests and areas of expertise include autoimmune diseases (multiple sclerosis, rheumatoid arthritis), drug development, ions and ion channels in disease, and targeted therapies.

== Education and early life ==
Beeton graduated with a bachelor's degree from the Université de la Mediterranée in the 1990s before later graduating from the same university with a Master of Science in biochemistry. In 1997, she joined Evelyne Béraud's group and received her PhD in Immunology. After graduating with her doctorate in 2001, Beeton moved to the US where she met and worked with K. George Chandy on her postdoctoral fellowship.

After her fellowship ended in 2006, Beeton was awarded a promotion and assumed her new role as assistant researcher. She later joined the faculty at Baylor College of Medicine in 2008 and has worked there ever since. In 2010, Beeton became the Academic Director of Cytometry and Cell Sorting Core for the Dan L Duncan Cancer Centre. She was promoted to her current position, associate professor, in 2015.

== Work and research ==
Beeton is a pioneer in her field, being the first person able to show the significant benefits of blocking Kv1.1 and Kv1.3 channels with kaliotoxin - a component of scorpion venom - as a preventative measure against multiple sclerosis in animals. Throughout her postdoctoral fellowship she collaborated with other doctors and developed an extremely potent and selective blocker of Kv1.3 channels. Beeton, alongside her fellow doctors, owns the world-wide patent on this blocker which is known as ShK-186, or dalazatide. Clinical trials have been carried out on volunteers and show that the blocker is well tolerated and displays efficacy. More recently Beeton has been focussing on the production and delivery of the blockers and other compounds which are related.

Beeton's laboratory mainly looks at targeting potassium channels for the treatment of chronic diseases, such as rheumatoid arthritis and multiple sclerosis. Recently, the lab identified KCa1.1 as the major potassium channel at the sugar of synoviocytes in patients with rheumatoid arthritis and is now working to understand the mechanisms of KCa1.1 expression and function in synoviocytes. As well as this, Beeton and her colleagues are looking at developing selective KCa1.1 blockers as potential therapeutics for chronic diseases.

Beeton has also started collaborating Dr. Tour at Rice University to understand the mechanisms of action of carbon-based antioxidant nanoparticles in T lymphocytes and their potential as novel immunomodulators for T lymphocyte-mediated autoimmune diseases.

== Honours and awards ==
=== Clark Faculty service award ===
Beeton achieved the Clark Faculty Service Award in 2018. This award is to honour members of the Baylor College of Medicine faculty who have demonstrated that they are exceptional, altruistic, and community-driven. To receive the Clark Award a person must have been a staff member at Baylor for at least 5 years previous and nominees must not have already achieved a different major institutional award.

=== Laverna Titus Award ===
In 2005, Beeton received the Laverna Titus Award from the American Heart Association for her research.
