= RAI1 =

Mammalian protein found in Homo sapiens

Identifiers
- Aliases: RAI1, SMCR, SMS, retinoic acid induced 1
- External IDs: OMIM: 607642; MGI: 103291; GeneCards: RAI1

Gene location (Human)
Chr.	Chromosome 17 (human)
Band	17p11.2	Start	17,681,458 bp
Band	17p11.2	End	17,811,453 bp

Gene location (Mouse)
Chr.	Chromosome 11 (mouse)
Band	11|11 B1.3-B2	Start	60,105,013 bp
Band	11|11 B1.3-B2	End	60,199,197 bp
RNA expression pattern
Bgee	Human / Mouse (ortholog); Top expressed in: retinal pigment epithelium; nipple; palpebral conjunctiva; urethra; pylorus; tibia; Brodmann area 23; cardia; human penis; parietal lobe / Top expressed in: lateral septal nucleus; habenula; anterior amygdaloid area; olfactory tubercle; ventromedial nucleus; subiculum; dorsomedial hypothalamic nucleus; Rostral migratory stream; lateral hypothalamus; mammillary body; More reference expression data
BioGPS	n/a
Gene ontology
Molecular function	protein binding; metal ion binding; DNA-binding transcription factor activity
Cellular component	cytoplasm; mitochondrion; nucleoplasm; nucleus
Biological process	positive regulation of transcription, DNA-templated; skeletal system development; negative regulation of multicellular organism growth; regulation of transcription by RNA polymerase II; circadian regulation of gene expression; rhythmic process; positive regulation of transcription by RNA polymerase II
Sources:Amigo / QuickGO
Orthologs
Databases	NCBI: entry; OMA: entry
Species	Human	Mouse
Entrez	10743	19377
Ensembl	ENSG00000108557	ENSMUSG00000062115
UniProt	Q7Z5J4	Q61818
RefSeq (mRNA)	NM_030665; NM_017574; NM_152256	NM_001037764; NM_009021
RefSeq (protein)	NP_109590	NP_001032853; NP_033047
Location (UCSC)	Chr 17: 17.68 – 17.81 Mb	Chr 11: 60.11 – 60.2 Mb
PubMed search
- Wikidata
View/Edit Human	View/Edit Mouse

Retinoic acid-induced protein 1 is a transcription factor that in humans is encoded by the RAI1 gene. Mutations or copy number alterations affecting this gene are associated with neurodevelopmental disorders. Deletions of RAI1 are a primary cause of Smith–Magenis syndrome, whereas duplications of the gene are associated with Potocki–Lupski syndrome.

== See also ==
- Retinoic acid
