= Yvon Berland =

French academic

- Born: February 5, 1951 (age 75)
- Occupations: University professor and administrator

Yvon Berland (born 1951) is a French university professor and administrator. He serves as the President of Aix-Marseille University.

== Biography ==
=== Early life ===
Yvon Berland was born on February 5, 1951. He received his PhD in Medical Studies in 1979.

=== Career ===
He taught nephrology at the University of the Mediterranean. He served as President of the stade marseillais université club from 1995 to 2004. He was elected its President in 2004, and re-elected in 2009. He served as Vice-President of the Conférence des Présidents d'Université from December 2010 to December 2012. Since June 2011, he has served as President of the Cancéropôle PACA. Since 2012, he has served as the first President of Aix-Marseille University.

He is an officer of the Ordre des Palmes Académiques, the National Order of Merit and the Legion of Honour.

== Bibliography ==
- Néphrologie pour l'interne. : Tome 1 (with Bertrand Dussol, Elsevier Masson, 2000).
- Néphrologie pour l'interne. : Tome 2 (with Bertrand Dussol, Elsevier Masson, 2000).
- Néphrologie pour l'interne. : Tome 3 (with Bertrand Dussol, Elsevier Masson, 2001).
- Néphrologie pour l'interne. : Tome 4 (with Bertrand Dussol, Henri Vacher-Coponat, Valérie Moal, 2003).
- Le défi des compétences : Comprendre et mettre en oeuvre la réforme des études infirmières (with Marie-Ange Coundray and Catherine Gay, Elsevier Masson, 2009).
