= Wah Chiu =

American biophysicist

- Born: 5 June 1947 (age 79); Hong Kong
- Education: University of California, Berkeley (BS, PhD)
- Scientific career
- Fields: Biophysics
- Workplaces: University of Arizona College of Medicine – Tucson, Baylor College of Medicine, Stanford University

Chinese name
- Traditional Chinese: 趙華
- Simplified Chinese: 赵华
- Hanyu Pinyin: Zhào Huá
- Yale Romanization: Chiuh Wàh

Wah Chiu (Chinese: 趙華) is a Hong Kong-born American biophysicist, currently the Wallenberg-Bienenstock Chair Professor in the department of bioengineering, department of microbiology and immunology and the Photon Science Directorate of SLAC National Accelerator Laboratory at Stanford University. He is a Stanford Bio-X affiliated Faculty. He was formerly the Distinguished Service Professor and the Alvin Romansky Chair Professor at Baylor College of Medicine where he was the founding director of the National Center for Biomolecular Imaging, and has been active in the new cryo-EM techniques allowing much higher-resolution structures of large molecular complexes such as viruses and chaperonin.

== Biography ==
Chiu was born in Hong Kong, and attended Pui Ching Middle School. He moved to the U.S. to study at University of California, Berkeley, where he received both his B.S. (1969) and Ph.D. (1975). He was elected an academician of Taiwan's Academia Sinica in 2008 and a member of the United States National Academy of Sciences in 2012. He has also received several honors including the Distinguished Science Award from the Microscopy Society of America and the Honorary Doctorate of Philosophy from the University of Helsinki, Finland in 2014.
