= R. Ellen Magenis =

American geneticist

- Born: September 24, 1925; Gary, Indiana
- Died: February 4, 2014 (aged 88)
- Education: Indiana University, Bloomington (BA 1948); Indiana University School of Medicine, Indianapolis (MD 1952)
- Known for: Mapping haptoglobin to 16q, Smith–Magenis syndrome
- Children: Six
- Scientific career
- Fields: Pediatrics, medical genetics, cytogenetics
- Institutions: University of Oregon Medical School

Ruth Ellen Magenis (September 24, 1925 – February 4, 2014) was an American pediatrician, medical geneticist and cytogeneticist.

She was born in Gary, Indiana and received her BA in zoology from Indiana University in Bloomington, Indiana in 1948 and her MD degree from the Indiana University School of Medicine in Indianapolis in 1952. She took a number of years off to raise a large family of 6 children. She then returned to work in 1965–66 with Frederick Hecht in pediatrics and medical genetics at the University of Oregon Medical School, now called the Oregon Health & Science University (OHSU), in Portland where Magenis subsequently completed her residency training in Pediatrics and then did a postdoctoral fellowship in Medical Genetics.

Magenis's first major research project involved a heritable fragile site on the long (q) arm of chromosome 16. She traced this 16q fragile site through a multigenerational family and, together with Hecht and Everett Lovrien, she linked the 16q fragile site to the gene for haptoglobin. The mapping of haptoglobin to 16q was the second instance in which a human gene was mapped to a specific autosome (non-sex chromosome), presaging the Human Genome Project.

Magenis joined the faculty at OHSU as an assistant professor, rising to be professor of pediatrics and of molecular and medical genetics. She succeeded Frederick Hecht as the director of the Cytogenetic Laboratory and Chromosome Clinic at the Child Development and Rehabilitation Center at OHSU. Her special interest continued to be in human chromosome mapping. Magenis died on February 4, 2014, after a long illness.

Ellen Magenis is also associated with the Smith–Magenis syndrome, a condition she and Ann C. M. Smith described in 1986 that is due to an abnormality in the short (p) arm of chromosome 17 and is sometimes called the 17p- syndrome.
