= JoAnne S. Richards =

JoAnne Stewart Richards is a professor of molecular and cellular biology at Baylor College of Medicine and the director of the cell biology graduate program. Her laboratory studies ovarian cancer and the molecular mechanisms in ovarian function.

== Career ==
Richards earned a B.S. in biology from Oberlin College and then began studying in the Master of Arts and Teaching Program at Brown University. While there, she began doing research ovarian cells, eventually entering a Ph.D. program at Brown University in physiological chemistry. After graduating, she did postdoctoral research at the University of Michigan Ann Arbor from 1971 to 1973. She remained there as faculty before moving to Baylor College of Medicine in 1981.

She has served as the director of the graduate studies program for the Department of Cell Biology at Baylor since 1988.

Richards was elected as a fellow of the American Academy of Arts and Sciences in 1994.
