= Sharmila Anandasabapathy =

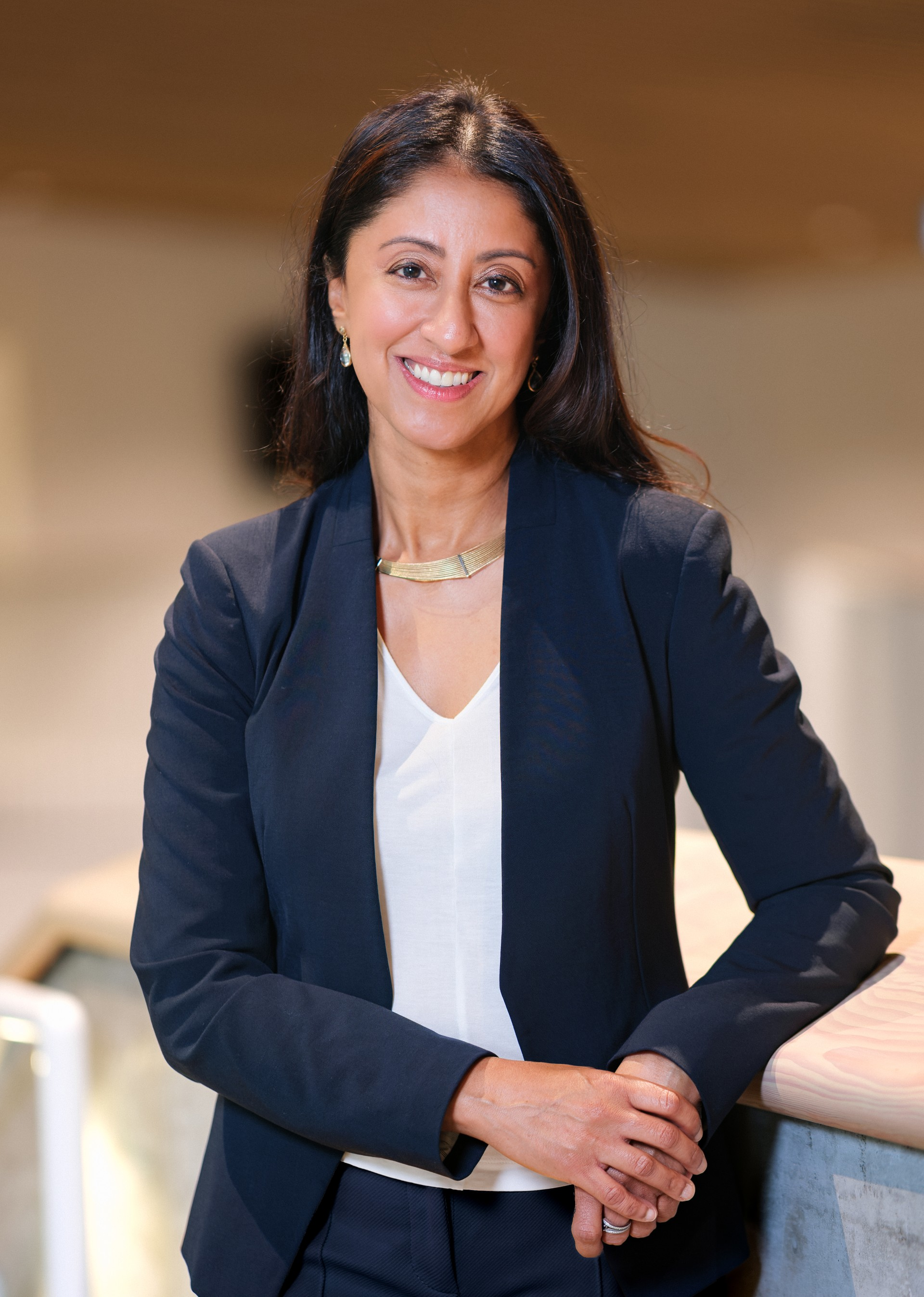
- Sharmila Anandasabapathy in 2025

Dean of the Faculty of Medicine and Vice-President, Health at the University of British Columbia
- Incumbent
- Assumed office November 1, 2025

Personal details
- Education: Albert Einstein College of Medicine; Yale University
- Scientific career
- Known for: Gastrointestinal cancer research
- Fields: Medicine
- Workplaces: The University of British Columbia; Baylor College of Medicine

Sharmila Anandasabapathy is a Sri Lankan-American physician and researcher in the field of gastrointestinal cancer. She serves as Dean of the Faculty of Medicine and Vice-President, Health at the University of British Columbia.

== Education ==
Anandasabapathy pursued a Bachelor of Arts degree in English literature from Yale University. She earned her doctor of medicine (M.D.) degree from the Albert Einstein College of Medicine.

== Career ==
Anandasabapathy was an intern and resident at the New York-Presbyterian Hospital's Weill Cornell Medical Center and Memorial Sloan Kettering Cancer Center for three years. In 2004, she completed her gastroenterology fellowship at Mount Sinai Medical and did advanced training in the endoscopic management of Barrett's esophagus and esophageal cancer. After the fellowship, she joined the faculty at Mount Sinai School of Medicine. She was also a faculty member at the M.D. Anderson Cancer Center for three years between 2005 and 2008. After that, she served as Chief of Endoscopy till 2013 at Mount Sinai Medical Center. Following her appointment at Mount Sinai Medical Center, she was a professor of medicine in gastroenterology at the Baylor College of Medicine. She also served as the vice president and director of Baylor Global Health, where she oversaw international programs. In June 2025, she was appointed Dean of the Faculty of Medicine and Vice-President, Health at the University of British Columbia for a five-year term, which began in November.

=== Medical practice ===
Anandasabapathy practiced gastroenterology and endoscopy as an attending physician at Baylor-St. Luke's Medical Center. Prior to this, she was attending physician at Mount Sinai Medical Center and the M.D. Anderson Medical Center.

=== Research ===
Anandasabapathy's research is focused on the diagnosis and treatment of gastrointestinal cancer using innovative technologies. She has been the principal investigator on multiple grants funded by the National Institutes of Health and National Cancer Institute, through which she has led various clinical trials for the diagnosis of esophageal and gastric cancer. Anandasabapathy has published numerous papers and articles in various journals about gastroenterology and cancer. She has also been involved in the development of guidelines for Barrett's esophagus, which were published in June 2013.

Anandasabapathy's publications and research have been used in advanced imaging technologies for the detection of gastrointestinal cancers.

In 2018, Anandasabapathy and her team at Baylor College of Medicine developed the Emergency Smart Pod, a "rapidly deployable, expandable shipping container-based unit." It was designed for the management of outbreaks and emergencies globally.

=== Awards and recognition ===
Anandasabapathy was named as one of the "Women on the move" by the Texas Medical Center in 2017. She was featured as USAID female innovator and Influential Women on Houston on International Women's Week. She is also chair of the AGA Women's Committee and associate editor of Gastrointestinal Endoscopy.
