= Pathophysiology of hypertension =

Physiological processes of hypertension

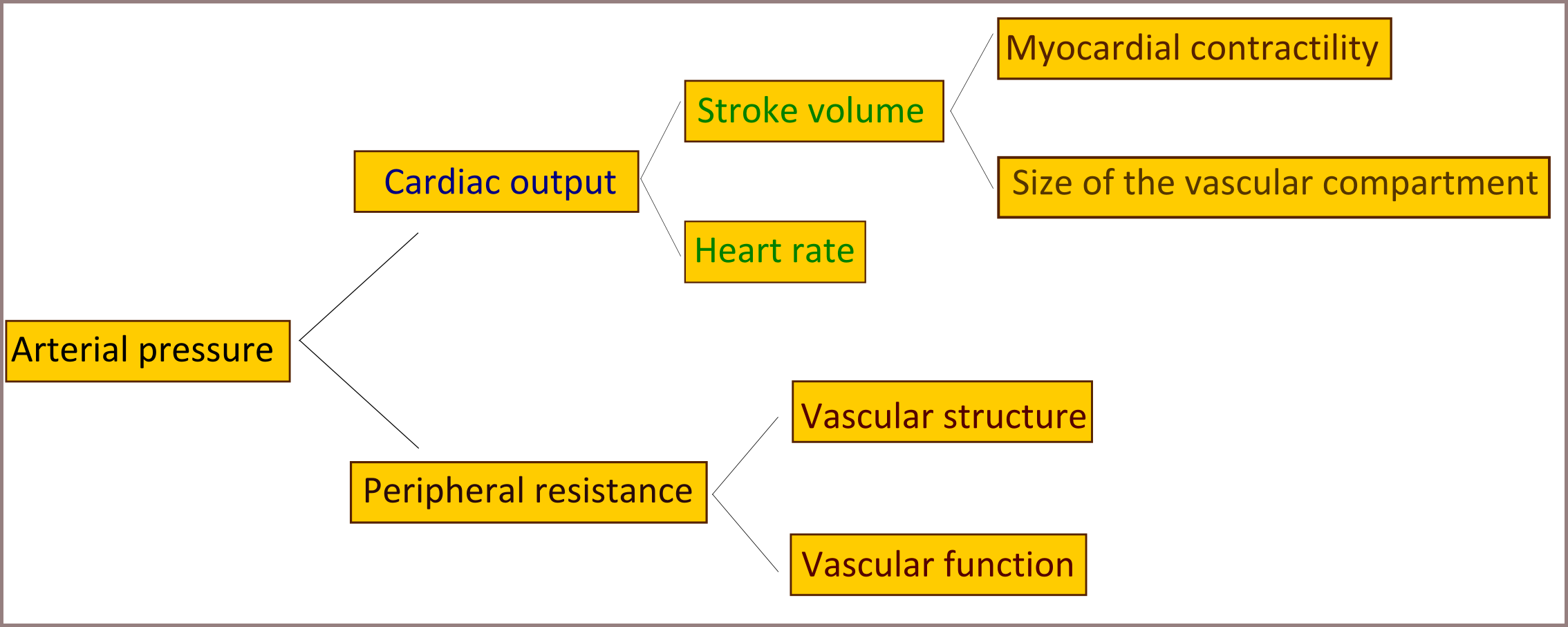
A diagram explaining factors affecting arterial pressure

Pathophysiology is a study which explains the function of the body as it relates to diseases and conditions. The pathophysiology of hypertension is an area which attempts to explain mechanistically the causes of hypertension, which is a chronic disease characterized by elevation of blood pressure. Hypertension can be classified by cause as either essential (also known as primary or idiopathic) or secondary. About 90–95% of hypertension is essential hypertension. Some authorities define essential hypertension as that which has no known explanation, while others define its cause as being due to overconsumption of sodium and underconsumption of potassium. Secondary hypertension indicates that the hypertension is a result of a specific underlying condition with a well-known mechanism, such as chronic kidney disease, narrowing of the aorta or kidney arteries, or endocrine disorders such as excess aldosterone, cortisol, or catecholamines. Persistent hypertension is a major risk factor for hypertensive heart disease, coronary artery disease, stroke, aortic aneurysm, peripheral artery disease, and chronic kidney disease.

Cardiac output and peripheral resistance are the two determinants of arterial pressure. Cardiac output is determined by stroke volume and heart rate; stroke volume is related to myocardial contractility and to the size of the vascular compartment. Peripheral resistance is determined by functional and anatomic changes in small arteries and arterioles.

== Genetics ==
Single gene mutations can cause Mendelian forms of high blood pressure; ten genes have been identified which cause these monogenic forms of hypertension. These mutations affect blood pressure by altering kidney salt handling. There is greater similarity in blood pressure within families than between families, which indicates a form of inheritance, and this is not due to shared environmental factors. With the aid of genetic analysis techniques, a statistically significant linkage of blood pressure to several chromosomal regions, including regions linked to familial combined hyperlipidemia, was found. These findings suggest that there are many genetic loci, in the general population, each with small effects on blood pressure. Approximately 280 genetic variants are affiliated with being at risk for high blood pressure, and they lead to other cardiovascular diseases such as hypertension or coronary artery disease as well. Overall, however, identifiable single-gene causes of hypertension are uncommon, consistent with a multifactorial cause of essential hypertension.

== Autonomic nervous system ==
The autonomic nervous system plays a central role in maintaining cardiovascular homeostasis via pressure, volume, and chemoreceptor signals. It does this by regulating the peripheral vasculature, and kidney function, which in turn affect cardiac output, vascular resistance, and fluid retention. Excess activity of the sympathetic nervous system increases blood pressure and contributes to hypertension.

The mechanisms of increased sympathetic nervous system activity in hypertension involve alterations in baroreflex and chemoreflex pathways at both peripheral and central levels. Arterial baroreceptors are reset to a higher pressure in hypertensive patients, and this peripheral resetting reverts to normal when arterial pressure is normalized. Furthermore, there is central resetting of the aortic baroreflex in hypertensive patients, resulting in suppression of sympathetic inhibition after activation of aortic baroreceptor nerves. This baroreflex resetting seems to be mediated, at least partly, by a central action of angiotensin II. Additional small-molecule mediators that suppress baroreceptor activity and contribute to exaggerated sympathetic drive in hypertension include reactive oxygen species and endothelin. Some studies have shown that hypertensive patients manifest greater vasoconstrictor responses to infused norepinephrine than normotensive controls. And that hypertensive patients do not show the normal response to increased circulating norepinephrine levels which generally induces downregulation of noradrenergic receptor, and it is believed that this abnormal response is genetically inherited.

Exposure to stress increases sympathetic outflow, and repeated stress-induced vasoconstriction may result in vascular hypertrophy, leading to progressive increases in peripheral resistance and blood pressure. This could partly explain the greater incidence of hypertension in lower socioeconomic groups, since they must endure greater levels of stress associated with daily living. Persons with a family history of hypertension manifest augmented vasoconstrictor and sympathetic responses to laboratory stressors, such as cold pressor testing and mental stress, that may predispose them to hypertension. This is particularly true of young African Americans. Exaggerated stress responses may contribute to the increased incidence of hypertension in this group. For patients having hypertension, higher heart rate variability (HRV) is a risk factor for atrial fibrillation.

Resistant hypertension can be treated by electrically stimulating the baroreflex with a pacemaker-like device.

== Renin–angiotensin–aldosterone system ==
Another system maintaining the extracellular fluid volume, peripheral resistance, and that if disturbed may lead to hypertension, is the renin–angiotensin–aldosterone system. Renin is a circulating enzyme that participates in maintaining extracellular volume and arterial vasoconstriction, therefore contributing to regulation of blood pressure. It performs this function by breaking down (hydrolysing) angiotensinogen, secreted from the liver, into the peptide angiotensin I. Angiotensin I is further cleaved by an enzyme that is located primarily but not exclusively in the pulmonary circulation bound to endothelium; that enzyme is angiotensin converting enzyme (ACE). This cleavage produces angiotensin II, the most vasoactive peptide. Angiotensin II is a potent constrictor of all blood vessels. It acts on the musculature of arteries, raising peripheral resistance and thereby elevating blood pressure. Angiotensin II also causes the adrenal glands to release aldosterone, which stimulates the epithelial cells of the kidneys to increase re-absorption of salt and water, leading to raised blood volume and raised blood pressure. So elevated renin levels in the blood (normally 1.98-2.46 ng/ml in the upright position) leads to hypertension.

Recent studies claim that obesity is a risk factor for hypertension because of activation of the renin–angiotensin system (RAS) in adipose tissue, and also linked renin–angiotensin system with insulin resistance, and claims that anyone can cause the other. Local production of angiotensin II in various tissues, including the blood vessels, heart, adrenals, and brain, is controlled by ACE and other enzymes, including the serine protease chymase. The activity of local renin–angiotensin systems and alternative pathways of angiotensin II formation may make an important contribution to remodeling of resistance vessels and the development of target organ damage (i.e. left ventricular hypertrophy, congestive heart failure, atherosclerosis, stroke, end-stage kidney disease, myocardial infarction, and arterial aneurysm) in hypertensive persons.

== Endothelial dysfunction ==
The endothelium of blood vessels produces an extensive range of substances that influence blood flow and, in turn, is affected by changes in the blood and the pressure of blood flow. For example, local nitric oxide and endothelin, which are secreted by the endothelium, are the major regulators of vascular tone and blood pressure. In patients with essential hypertension, the balance between the vasodilators and the vasoconstrictors is upset, which leads to changes in the endothelium and sets up a "vicious cycle" that contributes to the maintenance of high blood pressure. In patients with hypertension, endothelial activation and damage also lead to changes in vascular tone, vascular reactivity, and coagulation and fibrinolytic pathways. Alterations in endothelial function are a reliable indicator of target organ damage and atherosclerotic disease, as well as prognosis.

Evidence suggests that oxidant stress alters many functions of the endothelium, including modulation of vasomotor tone. Inactivation of nitric oxide (NO) by superoxide and other reactive oxygen species (ROS) seems to occur in conditions such as hypertension. Normally nitric oxide is an important regulator and mediator of numerous processes in the nervous, immune and cardiovascular systems, including smooth muscle relaxation thus resulting in vasodilation of the artery and increasing blood flow, suppressor of migration and proliferation of vascular smooth-muscle cells. It has been suggested that angiotensin II enhances formation of the oxidant superoxide at concentrations that affect blood pressure minimally.

Endothelin is a potent vasoactive peptide produced by endothelial cells that has both vasoconstrictor and vasodilator properties. Circulating endothelin levels are increased in some hypertensive patients, particularly African Americans and persons with hypertension.

== Sodium/potassium ratio hypothesis of essential hypertension ==
A 2007 review article states that while excessive sodium consumption has long been recognized as contributing to the risk of hypertension, "potassium, the main intracellular cation, has usually been viewed as a minor factor in the pathogenesis of hypertension. However, abundant evidence indicates that a potassium deficit has a critical role in hypertension and its cardiovascular sequelae." The authors state that modern, western, high sodium, low potassium diets result in corresponding changes in intracellular concentration of these, the two most important cations in animal cells. This imbalance leads to contraction of vascular smooth muscle, restricting blood flow and so driving up blood pressure. The authors cite studies which show that potassium supplementation is effective in reducing hypertension.

Epidemiological support for this hypothesis can be found in a 2014 meta-analysis which states that "the sodium-to-potassium ratio appears to be more strongly associated with blood pressure outcomes than either sodium or potassium alone in hypertensive adult populations.".

== Inflammation and adverse immune responses ==
Basic science discoveries have implicated the immune system as in the development of hypertension in animal models. Population studies in humans have reported that higher levels of certain inflammatory cytokines are associated with greater risk of hypertension development.
