= Potocki–Shaffer syndrome =

- Other names: Proximal 11p deletion syndrome, DEFECT11 syndrome

Potocki–Shaffer syndrome (PSS), also known as DEFECT11 syndrome or chromosome 11p11.2 deletion syndrome, is a rare contiguous gene syndrome that results from the microdeletion of section 11.2 on the short arm of chromosome 11 (11p11.2). The syndrome has its name from Dr. Lorraine (Lori) Potocki and Dr. Lisa Shaffer who discovered the deletion on the 11th chromosome and studied the impacts.

The deletion of this combination of genes results in several distinctive congenital features, occasional defects in the heart, kidneys, and urinary tract. The disorder is associated with an enlarged parietal foramina which can cause openings in the two bones that form the top and sides of the skull. These abnormal openings form extra "soft spots" on the head, in addition to the two that newborns normally have, and unlike the usual newborn soft spots, the enlarged parietal foramina remain open throughout life. Other signs can include multiple mostly noncancerous benign bone tumours called osteochondromas (exostosis), developmental delay, vision disorders and craniofacial abnormalities. It is classified as a rare disease.

== Signs and symptoms ==
The signs and symptoms of Potocki–Shaffer syndrome vary widely. In addition to multiple osteochondromas and enlarged parietal foramina, affected individuals often have intellectual disability and delayed development of speech, motor skills (such as sitting and walking), and social skills. Many people with this condition have distinctive facial features, which can include a wide, short skull (brachycephaly); a prominent forehead; a narrow bridge of the nose; a shortened distance between the nose and upper lip (a short philtrum); and a downturned mouth. Less commonly, Potocki–Shaffer syndrome causes vision problems, additional skeletal abnormalities, and defects in the heart, kidneys, and urinary tract.

== Genetics ==
Potocki–Shaffer syndrome follows an autosomal dominant inheritance pattern, which means a deletion of genetic material from one copy of chromosome 11 is sufficient to cause the disorder. In some cases, an affected person inherits the chromosome with a deleted segment from an affected parent. More commonly, the condition results from a deletion that occurs during the formation of reproductive cells (eggs and sperm) in a parent or in early fetal development. These cases occur in people with no history of the disorder in their family.

== Diagnosis ==
Potocki–Shaffer syndrome can be detected through array comparative genomic hybridization (aCGH).

== Management ==
Some symptoms can be managed with drug therapy, surgery and rehabilitation, genetic counselling, and palliative care.

== See also ==
- Chromosome nomenclature
