= Michael J. Reardon =

American cardiac surgeon and medical researcher

Michael J. Reardon is an American cardiac surgeon and medical researcher. He is known for his work in heart autotransplantation for malignant heart tumors, an operation in which the surgeon removes the patient's heart, cuts out the malignant tumor, and reimplants the heart back in the patient's chest. He performed the first successful heart autotransplantation for a cancerous heart tumor in 1998.

Dr. Reardon has served as a leading clinical investigator in the trans-catheter aortic valve replacement (TAVR) field. He serves as the national surgical principal investigator for the Evolut intermediate-risk trial (SURTAVI, NCT01586910), the Evolut low-risk trial (NCT02701283), the Evolut 34 mm trial (NCT02746809), the Evolut 2.0 trial (NCT02738853), the Reprise III Lotus high and extreme risk trial (NCT02202434), the Acurate trial (NCT03735667), the Portico NG trial (NCT04011722) and the Vantage trial (NCT04788888). He serves as a national study chair for the Reprove IV trial (NCT03618095) and the Evolut low-risk bicuspid trial (NCT03635424).

== Education ==
Reardon received his medical education from Baylor College of Medicine where he graduated with honors in 1978. He received his general surgery residency at Baylor College of Medicine in 1983 working under Dr. Michael E. DeBakey, and completed a thoracic surgery fellowship training at Texas Heart Institute in 1985 under the tutelage of Dr. Denton Cooley.

== Career ==
Reardon's career includes accomplishments as an attending physician and medical school professor in Houston, Texas. He joined the staff of the Houston Methodist Hospital in 1985 following his cardiac fellowship. He became a faculty member of Baylor College of Medicine in 1993 and served as the first chief of cardiothoracic surgery at Baylor after the retirement of Dr. Michael DeBakey. After Baylor College of Medicine left the Houston Methodist Hospital, he became the first chief of cardiac surgery at the Houston Methodist Hospital. He was appointed as Chief of Cardiac Surgery and Professor of Cardiothoracic Surgery of Weill Cornell Medical College and Houston Methodist Hospital in 1995. He currently also holds the position of Allison Family Chair of Cardiovascular Research at the Houston Methodist Hospital and Clinical Professor of Cardiothoracic Surgery at MD Anderson Cancer Center and created the multi-institution, multidisciplinary cardiac tumor team with Houston Methodist Hospital and MD Anderson Cancer Center.

== Honors and awards ==
Reardon has received numerous awards including the Overstreet Award and Noon Award. He currently holds the Allison Family Distinguished Chair of Cardiovascular Research and divides his time between building innovative clinical, research and educational programs.

== Research interests and contributions ==
Reardon's research interests have focused on aortic surgery, cardiac valve surgery and cardiac tumors. He has served on the national steering committee for the CoreValve, SurTAVI and reprise III TAVR trials and as national surgical principal investigator on the SurTAVI trial, reprise III trial and the Gore type A dissection trial.

He has given numerous research presentations and published extensively in areas including cardiac tumor treatment, catheter-based approaches to structural heart disease, catheter-based and open aortic disease treatment. He has published more than 1,000 articles and abstracts, and also serves as a reviewer for journals including the Annals of Thoracic Surgery, Journal of Thoracic and Cardiovascular Surgery, JACC, American Heart Journal, New Rngland Journal of Medicine and Circulation. He is the associate editor of surgery for the Methodist DeBakey Cardiovascular Journal.
