= Janet S. Butel =

American virologist

Janet S Butel
- Education: B.S. Kansas State University (1963) Ph.D. Baylor College of Medicine (1966)
- Known for: Study of SV40 in humans through animal model in golden hamsters.
- Awards: American Association for the Advancement of Science Fellow (1988)
- Scientific career
- Fields: Virology, molecular virology, immunology, microbiology
- Institutions: Baylor College of Medicine

Janet S Butel is the Chairman and Distinguished Service Professor in the molecular virology and microbiology department at Baylor College of Medicine. Her area of expertise is on polyomavirus pathogenesis of infections and disease. She has more than 120 publications on PubMed. She also has 6 publications in Nature, which is considered one of the most prestigious science journals. She is a member of 9 different organizations and has 13 honors and awards.

== Education ==
Butel received her Bachelor of Science degree from Kansas State University in June 1963. She then went on to get her Ph.D. in virology at Baylor College of Medicine in June 1966. After she received her PhD she did a Post-Doctoral Fellowship in virology at Baylor College of Medicine.

== Research contributions ==
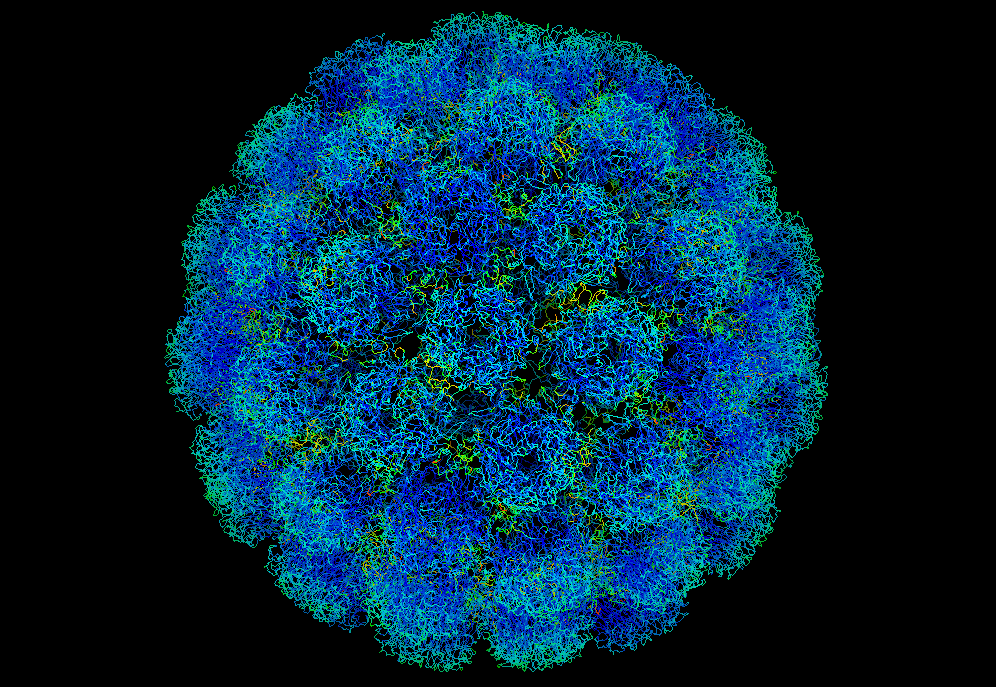
Simian virus 40

Butel has studied polyomavirus SV40 infection in humans and animals for most of her career. She has published studies on the mechanism of SV40 entry into human cells, the role of SV40 in cancer and SV40 genetics. In addition, Butel published an article in 2014 on the use of microRNA and SV40 in golden hamsters. The golden hamster is the animal model that SV40 has been studied in and has provided evidence of its pathogenesis in tumor forming cancer. The animal model has been used to research the development of this virus in humans, but can not conclude any definitive pathogenesis of SV40 in humans. Thus there is controversy over the exact impact of SV40 on human health. Butel's research indicates that SV40 may play a role in some human cancers, such as brain tumors and non-Hodgkin lymphoma.

In the 1990s Dr. Butel discovered the role of P53 in the pathogenesis of SV40 and oncogenesis. By discovering the role of P53 in SV40 she was able to support the research being conducted on P53 as a tumor-suppressor gene. This was perhaps the most important research of her career.

Dr. Butel has also studied the role of the polio vaccine and in human SV40 infection and integration of SV40 into our DNA. It was found that some vaccines contained pieces of SV40 genes. It is suspected that by incorporating SV40 into the vaccine allowed it to enter into our own DNA. Butel has published studies on topics other than SV40. She has studied the immunology of women going into spaceflight, specifically cytokines and antibodies. Butel also researched hepatitis B and the role it plays in DNA repair. Dr. Butel has also contributed to higher education and is a coauthor of a medical microbiology textbook that has been used for over 50 years and in medical colleges around the world. Dr. Butel has over 120 publications with over 10,000 citations, according to Google scholar.

== Honors and awards ==
- American Association for the Advancement of Science Fellow in 1988.
- Distinguished Service Professor at Baylor College of Medicine
- In 1997 she was in the Texas A&M University Press as a Women Pioneer in Texas Medicine
- Recipient of the Distinguished Alumnus of the Graduate School of Biomedical Sciences Award in 2002
- Kansas State University Alumni Fellow
- Recipient of the American Association for Cancer Research-Women in Cancer Research-Charlotte Friend Memorial Lectureship
- Kyle and Josephine Morrow Chair in Molecular Virology and Microbiology at Baylor College of Medicine
- BioHouston Women in Science Award
- Honoree at the Hearts of Gold: Honoring Women in Health and Medical Science Gala
- The Joseph L. Melnick Professor of Virology at Baylor College of Medicine
