= Sharmila M. Mukhopadhyay =

Materials scientist

- Education: Indian Institute of Technology; Cornell University
- Awards: Jefferson Science Fellow (2016)
- Scientific career
- Workplaces: Wright State University; Polytechnic University, Brooklyn; Rutgers University

Sharmila Mitra Mukhopadhyay is a professor of materials science and Director of the Center for Nanoscale Multifunctional Materials at Wright State University. In 2016 she was elected as a Jefferson Science Fellow, working as a science advisor to the United States Department of State.

== Early life and education ==
Mukhopadhyay studied engineering at the Indian Institutes of Technology, where she earned her Bachelor's and master's degrees in 1983. Mukhopadhyay moved to Cornell University for her graduate studies. After earning her PhD in 1989, she joined Rutgers University as a postdoctoral fellow. She was appointed to the Polytechnic University, Brooklyn in 1990, where she worked in the metallurgy and materials science department.

== Research and career ==
Mukhopadhyay initially worked on superconductive materials such as yttrium barium copper oxide, which can be used in jet engines and medical devices. Her recent research considers nanotechnology and its applications in the biosciences. She is interested in safe and sustainable materials that can be used for energy storage, in biomedicine and to protect the environment. Her work has involved a range of graphene base structures, including carbon nanotubes for the development of biomimetic hierarchical structures. Mukhopadhyay uses precursor layers of reactive oxides that are created in a plasma, which allows nanotubes to attach onto uneven porous materials. In 2007 Mukhopadhyay became the Founding Director of the Center for Nanoscale Multifunctional Materials at Wright State University.

Mukopadhyay demonstrated that carbon nanotubes can be used to clean water, creating molecular sized brushes that contain "jellyfish-like" strands covered in nanocatalysts that can kill bacteria and remove dangerous pollutants. The strands increase the surface area of the chemical reaction, increasing the extent to which they can clean the water. To realise the invention, Mukhopadhyay worked in collaboration with Buckeye Composites and MetaMaterial Technologies. She grew the carbon nanotubes onto porous substrates to ensure that they could not escape into the environment and contribute to the pollution. She found that purifiers that were 8 mm^{2} made using her carbon nanotubes could purify a few gallons of water at a time. Her recent work considers the creation of high charge density capacitors, high thermal dissipation electronic materials and hand-held pathogen sensors.

Mukhopadhyay was the Founding Director of the Wright State University National Academy of Engineering Grand Challenge Scholars program in 2018. The program will support scholars in becoming future leaders across four themes; sustainability, health, security and joy of living. Mukhopadhyay is incorporating the Grand Challenges into the Wright State curriculum.

Mukhopadhyay was selected as a Jefferson Science Fellow in 2016. She serves as a Senior Scientific Advisor for the Bureau of Economic and Business Affairs. In this capacity, she advises the government on nanotechnology, and how it may impact biotechnology, pharmaceuticals, communication, infrastructure, energy and the environment. Within the United States Department of State Mukhopadhyay has built a working group on high-tech innovation, forming hubs that link industry and academia. She is involved with the Global Entrepreneurship Program within the Federal government of the United States.

=== Awards and honours ===
- 2003 Who's Who of America
- 2016 Jefferson Science Fellow

=== Selected publications ===
- Contributed to Sample Preparation Techniques in Analytical Chemistry Sample Preparation for Microscopic and Spectroscopic Characterization of Solid Surfaces and Films
- Mukhopadhyay, Sharmila M. (2011). Nanoscale Multifunctional Materials Science and Applications. Wiley-Blackwell. ISBN 9780470508916.
- Mukhopadhyay, Sharmila M. (1996). "A systems approach to flame retardancy and comments on modes of action". Polymer Degradation and Stability. 54.
- Mukhopadhyay, Sharmila M. (1990). "Surface studies of TiO2- SiO2 glasses by X-ray photoelectron spectroscopy". Journal of Non-Crystalline Solids. 126. doi:10.1016/0022-3093(90)90820-C.
