= Michael E. DeBakey Veterans Affairs Medical Center =

Coordinates: 29°42′00″N 95°23′20″W

- Veterans Health Administration
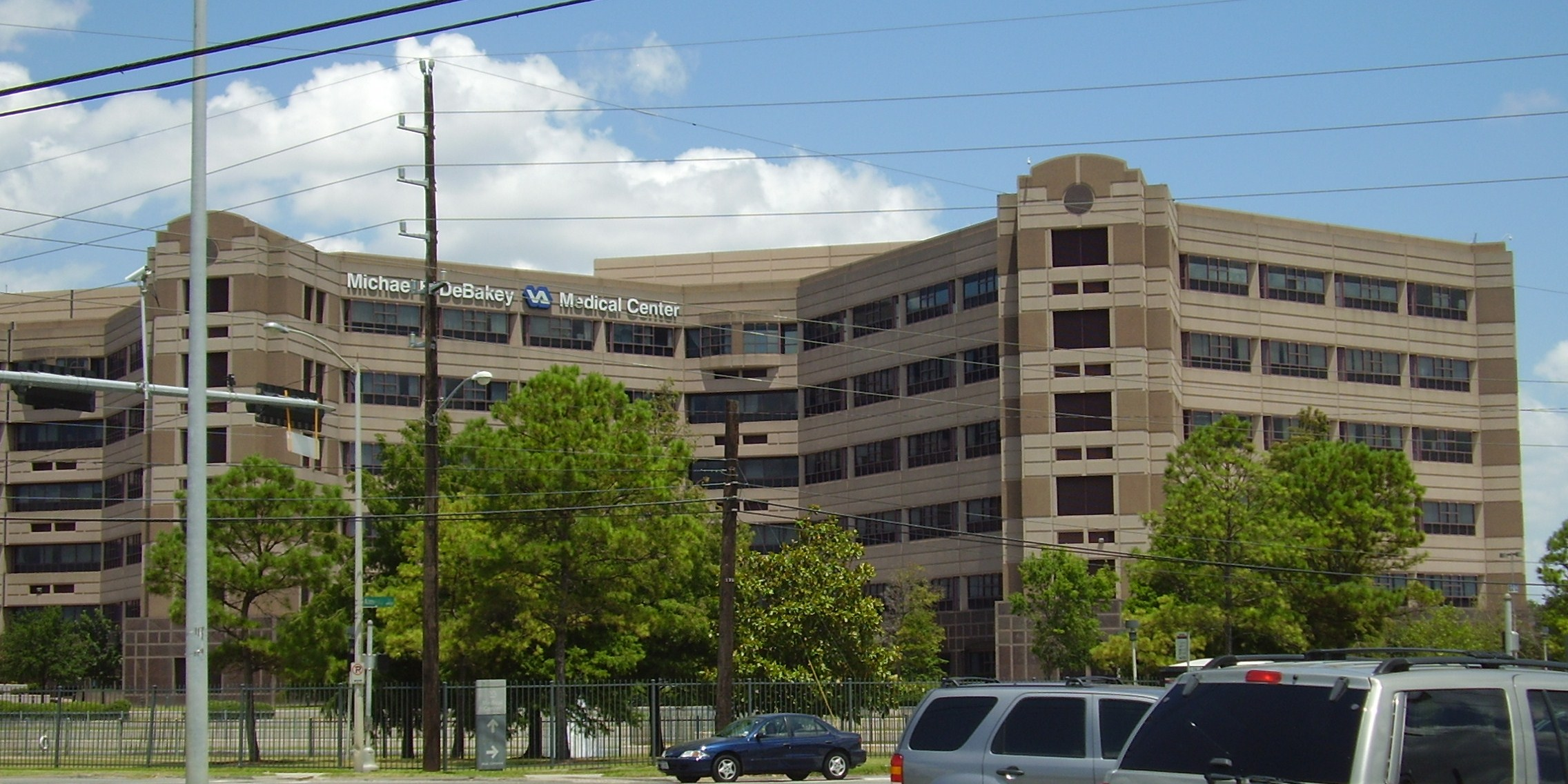

Geography
- Location: Texas Medical Center, Houston, Texas, United States

Organization
- Care system: Veterans' Affairs
- Type: General and teaching
- Affiliated university: Baylor College of Medicine

Services
- Emergency department: Comprehensive Emergency Center
- Beds: 535

History
- Opened: 1945

Links
- Website: www.houston.va.gov
- Lists: Hospitals in Texas

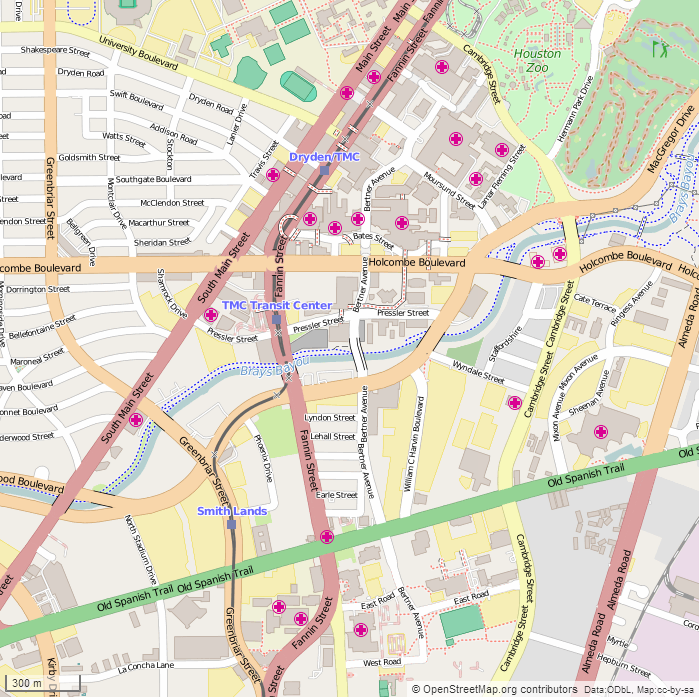
Location within Texas Medical Center

Michael E. DeBakey Veterans Affairs Medical Center (MEDVAMC) is a hospital affiliated with and operated by the United States Department of Veterans Affairs in the Texas Medical Center in Houston, Texas. It is one of the department's largest hospitals, serving Harris County, Texas and 27 surrounding counties. It is named for Michael E. DeBakey, a renowned surgeon and president of Baylor College of Medicine.

The hospital is on a 118-acre (48 ha) campus on Old Spanish Trail and Almeda, just on the edge of the Texas Medical Center. It is accredited by the Joint Commission, and has 343 hospital beds, a 40-bed Spinal Cord Injury Center, and a 120-bed transitional care unit for long-term care. The hospital is staffed by Baylor College of Medicine and The University of Texas Health Science Center at Houston faculty, residents, and students. Baylor College of Medicine has been affiliated with the hospital since 1949. The facility also takes students and residents from the University of Texas at Austin College of Pharmacy.

== History ==
The center was constructed in 1992 by JW Bateson and Centex Construction (later purchased by Balfour Beatty Construction).
