= James R. Lupski =

American geneticist

James R. Lupski (born February 22, 1957) is the Cullen Endowed Chair in Molecular Genetics and Professor in the Department of Pediatrics at Baylor College of Medicine. Lupski obtained his BA degree from New York University in 1979 and his PhD and MD degrees in 1984 and 1985, respectively, from the same institution. He later moved for his Residency in Pediatrics to Baylor College of Medicine, where he has stayed since. Lupski is affected by a genetic disease called Charcot-Marie-Tooth (CMT) and has studied the condition throughout his entire research career. He has also contributed to the discovery and definition of other genomic disorders caused by chromosomal copy number changes and several genetic diseases including Potocki-Lupski syndrome.

== See also ==
- Potocki–Lupski syndrome
