= J. Morgan Micheletti =

American ophthalmologist

- Citizenship: American
- Education: University of Texas; Baylor College of Medicine; Emory University School of Medicine
- Medical career
- Profession: Ophthalmologist
- Sub-specialties: Cataract surgery, refractive surgery, intraocular lens techniques

J. Morgan Micheletti, is an American ophthalmologist specializing in cataract surgery, refractive surgery, glaucoma surgery and complex anterior segment surgery. He is a partner, fellowship director, and research director at Berkeley Eye Center.

== Education ==
Micheletti completed his undergraduate studies at the University of Texas at Austin, where he received a bachelor of science degree in Cellular and Molecular Biology. Micheletti received his medical degree from the Baylor College of Medicine in Houston, Texas. He then completed his ophthalmology residency at Emory University in Atlanta, Georgia, focusing on advanced surgical techniques and innovations in eye care.

== Career ==
Micheletti is a partner, fellowship director, and research director at Berkeley Eye Center, where he specializes in cataract surgery, refractive surgery, and glaucoma surgery. He has developed a number of surgical instruments and techniques, including the Micheletti Intraocular Trephine, used for salvaging and relocating a lens through a novel "punch and rescue" technique. He developed a modified version of the twist and out technique which allows for two-handed control, which improves surgeon control when explanting an IOL.

In 2024, Micheletti described a new clinical finding termed "Capsular Waves," which serves as a warning indicator for potentially malpositioned intraocular lenses during surgery so that surgeons can determine whether an IOL is in the correct place prior to performing an Nd:YAG laser capsulotomy. He also developed ICLCalc, an online calculator designed to assist surgeons in determining the appropriate lens size for Implantable Collamer Lenses (ICLs).

Micheletti led the Joint Assessment of Material Exposure in Space (JAMES) project, which studies the effects of space environments factors on IOLs as part of Materials International Space Station Experiment 20. Under his supervision, surgical instruments were launched to the ISS aboard a Falcon 9 rocket as part of CRS SpX-31.

=== Fellowships and committees ===
Micheletti is a diplomate of the American Board of Ophthalmology, and a fellow of the American Academy of Ophthalmology, and the American College of Surgeons. He is chair of the Research Committee for the American-European Congress of Ophthalmic Surgery (AECOS), the Texas Ophthalmological Association, and the Houston Ophthalmological Society. He has also served on the AAO ONE Network Cataract Committee, the Young Eye Surgeons committee for the American Society of Cataract and Refractive Surgery, and the board of directors and Health Policy Committee for the Society for Excellence in Eyecare.

== Awards and recognitions ==
Micheletti was the AAO Video Competition Winner in 2021 and 2022. He has been ranked as a Castle Connolly Top Doctor since 2022. That year, he was also included on Ophthalmology Management's 40 Under 40 list of ophthalmologists in the United States. In 2024, Micheletti received the IIRSI Gold Medal from the Intraocular Implant & Refractive Society of India (IIRSI) for significant contributions to ophthalmic surgery and participation in international conferences. He also received the 2024 Outstanding Young Texas Ex Award from the Texas Exes for significant career achievements and service to the University.

== Selected articles ==
- Micheletti, J. Morgan; Hall, Brad (February 2025). "Assessment of measurement variability across automated biometry devices". Journal of Cataract & Refractive Surgery. 51 (2): 156. doi:10.1097/j.jcrs.0000000000001583. ISSN 0886-3350. PMID 39602354.
- Micheletti, J. Morgan; McCauley, Matthew B.; Duncan, Nicole; Hall, Brad (7 December 2023). "Biometric Indicators for Maximizing Intermediate Vision". Clinical Ophthalmology. 17: 3739–3746. doi:10.2147/OPTH.S441172. PMC 10712349. PMID 38089648.
- Micheletti, J.; Wang, Kendrick; Ton, Khanh; Bonem, Karlie (2024). "Capsular Waves: A Warning Indicator for Potentially Malpositioned Intraocular Lenses". Clinical Ophthalmology. 18: 2461–2466. doi:10.2147/OPTH.S474591. PMC 11379029. PMID 39246552.
- Micheletti, J. Morgan; Duncan, Nicole B.; Hall, Brad (21 December 2023). "Comparison of intermediate vision of two monofocal IOLs". Clinical Ophthalmology. 17: 3983–3990. doi:10.2147/OPTH.S444696. PMC 10749565.
- Micheletti, J. Morgan; Weber, Nicole; McCauley, Matthew B.; Doe, Erin A.; Coffee, Robert E.; Caplan, Michael B. (February 2022). "Punch and rescue technique for scleral fixation of dislocated single-piece intraocular lenses". Journal of Cataract & Refractive Surgery. 48 (2): 247–250. doi:10.1097/j.jcrs.0000000000000845. ISSN 0886-3350. PMID 34670946.
- Duncan, Nicole B.; Micheletti, J. Morgan (1 December 2022). "Modified adaptation of the twist-and-out technique for intraocular lens exchange". Journal of Cataract and Refractive Surgery. 48 (12): 1469–1471. doi:10.1097/j.jcrs.0000000000001047. PMID 36026711.
- Micheletti, J. Morgan; Brink, Matthew; Brubaker, Jacob W.; Ristvedt, Deborah; Sarkisian, Steven R. (December 2024). "Standalone interventional glaucoma: evolution from the combination-cataract paradigm". Journal of Cataract & Refractive Surgery. 50 (12): 1284–1290. doi:10.1097/j.jcrs.0000000000001537. ISSN 0886-3350. PMC 11556803.
- Micheletti, J. Morgan; Shultz, Mitchell; Singh, Inder Paul; Samuelson, Thomas W. (January 2021). "An Emerging Multi-mechanism and Multi-modal Approach in Interventional Glaucoma Therapy". Ophthalmology and Therapy. 14 (1): 13–22. doi:10.1007/s40123-024-01073-z. ISSN 2193-8245. PMC 11724811.
- Micheletti, J. Morgan; Lockwood, James C.; Rali, Aditya; Khalifa, Yousuf M. (September 2019). "Motor Vehicle–Associated Traumatic Ocular Injuries Secondary to External Rear-Facing Sideview Mirrors". JAMA Ophthalmology. 137 (9): 1067–1071. doi:10.1001/jamaophthalmol.2019.2513. PMC 6646990. PMID 31318406.
