= Smith–Magenis syndrome =

Human disease

- Other names: 17p11.2 microdeletion syndrome
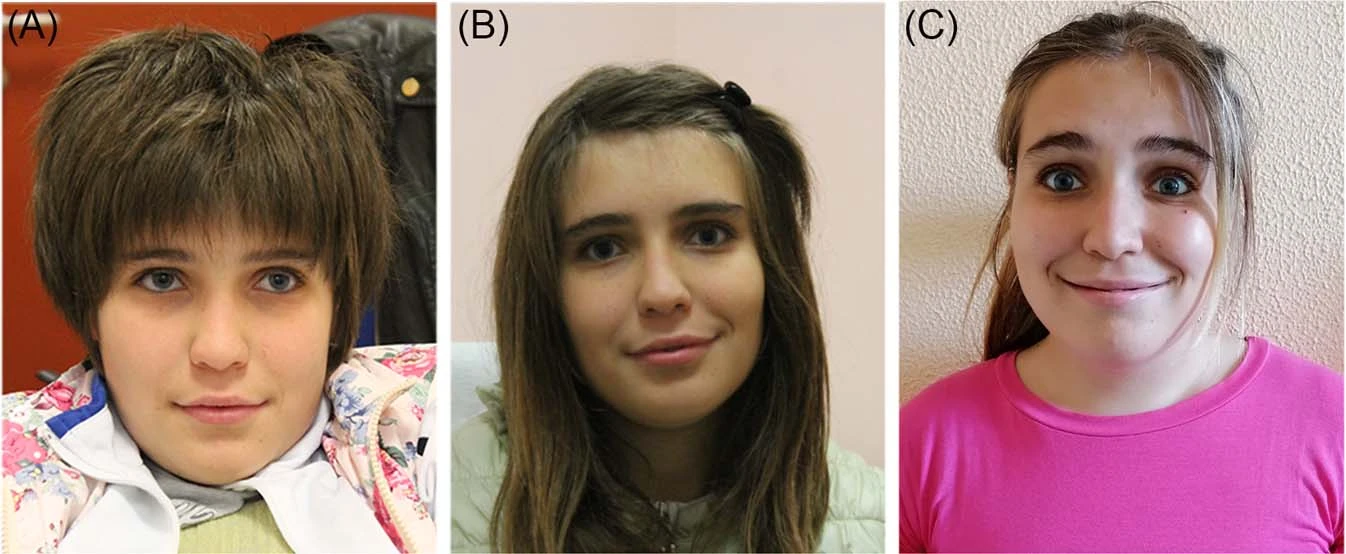
- This photo shows a patient with Smith–Magenis syndrome, who has typical facial features of that syndrome, such as a broad skull and face shape, hypoplasia of the midface, and dense eyebrows.
- Pronunciation: Smith- maga(e)nis
- Specialty: Genetic
- Symptoms: Dysmorphic facial features, intellectual disability, self harm, sleep disturbances, scoliosis, reduced sensitivity to pain and temperature
- Duration: Lifelong
- Causes: Microdeletion in the 17p11.2 region of chromosome 17
- Risk factors: Genetic
- Diagnostic method: Genetic testing
- Differential diagnosis: Autism (often mistaken at first but fixed later)
- Prevention: No prevention found
- Medication: Melatonin
- Frequency: 0.005%
- Deaths: (Unknown)

Smith–Magenis syndrome (SMS), also known as 17p-microdeletion syndrome, is a microdeletion syndrome characterized by an abnormality in the short (p) arm of chromosome 17. It has features including intellectual disability, facial abnormalities, difficulty sleeping, and numerous behavioral problems such as self-harm. Smith–Magenis syndrome affects an estimated between 1 in 15,000 to 1 in 25,000 individuals.

== Signs and symptoms ==
Facial features of children with Smith–Magenis syndrome include a broad and square face, deep-set eyes, large cheeks, and a prominent jaw, as well as a flat nose bridge (in the young child; as the child ages it becomes more ski-jump shaped). Eyes tend to be deep-set, close together, and slanted upwards. Eyebrows are heavy with lateral extension. The mouth is the most noticeable feature; both upper and lower lips are full, and the mouth is wide. The mouth curves downwards and the upper lip curves outwards, due to a fleshy philtrum. These facial features become more noticeable as the individual ages, as mandible growth outstrips that of the maxilla leading to a clear midface hypoplasia. There is also a mild brachycephaly.

Disrupted sleep patterns are characteristic of Smith–Magenis syndrome, typically beginning early in life. Affected individuals may be very sleepy during the day, but have trouble falling asleep and awaken several times each night due to an inverted circadian rhythm of melatonin.

Those affected by Smith–Magenis typically have behavioral problems, which include frequent temper tantrums, meltdowns and outbursts, aggression, anger, fidgeting, compulsive behavior, anxiety, impulsiveness, and difficulty paying attention. Self-harm behaviours, including biting, hitting, head banging, and skin picking, are very common. Behavioral complications in Smith–Magenis syndrome are thought to be worsened by issues with sleeping. Repetitive self-hugging is a behavioral trait that may be unique to Smith–Magenis syndrome. People with this condition may also compulsively lick their fingers and flip pages of books and magazines (a behavior known as "lick and flip"), as well as possessing an impressive ability to recall a wide range of small details about people or subject-specific trivia.

Other symptoms can include short stature, abnormal curvature of the spine (scoliosis), reduced sensitivity to pain and temperature, and a hoarse voice. Some people with this disorder have ear abnormalities that lead to hearing loss. Affected individuals may have eye abnormalities that cause nearsightedness (myopia), strabismus, and other problems with vision. Heart and kidney defects also have been reported in people with Smith–Magenis syndrome, though they are less common.

== Cause ==
Smith–Magenis syndrome is a chromosomal condition related to low copy repeats of specific segments of chromosome 17. Most people with SMS have a deletion of genetic material from a specific region of chromosome 17 (17p11.2). Although this region contains multiple genes, recently researchers discovered that the loss of one particular gene, the retinoic acid induced 1 or RAI1, is responsible for most of the characteristic features of this condition. Also, other genes within the chromosome 17 contribute to the variability and severity of the clinical features. The loss of other genes in the deleted region may help explain why the features of Smith–Magenis syndrome vary among affected individuals. A small percentage of people with Smith–Magenis syndrome have a mutation in the RAI1 gene instead of a chromosomal deletion.

These deletions and mutations lead to the production of an abnormal or nonfunctional version of the RAI1 protein. RAI1 is a transcription factor that regulates the expression of multiple genes, including several that are involved in controlling circadian rhythm, such as CLOCK. The groups led by James Lupski (Baylor College of Medicine) and Sarah Elsea (Virginia Commonwealth University) are in the process of studying the exact function of this gene in relation to Smith–Magenis syndrome.

SMS is typically not inherited. This condition usually results from a genetic change that occurs during the formation of reproductive cells (eggs or sperm) or in early fetal development. People with Smith–Magenis syndrome most often have no history of the condition in their family.

== Diagnosis ==
SMS is usually confirmed by blood tests called chromosome (cytogenetic) analysis and utilize a technique called FISH (fluorescent in situ hybridization). The characteristic micro-deletion was sometimes overlooked in a standard FISH test, leading to a number of people with the symptoms of SMS with negative results.

The recent development of the FISH for 17p11.2 deletion test has allowed more accurate detection of this deletion. However, further testing is required for variations of Smith–Magenis syndrome that are caused by a mutation of the RAI1 gene as opposed to a deletion.

Children with SMS are often given psychiatric diagnoses such as autism, attention deficit/hyperactivity disorder (ADHD), obsessive–compulsive disorder (OCD), attention deficit disorder (ADD), and/or mood disorders.

== Treatment ==
Treatment for Smith–Magenis syndrome relies on managing its symptoms. Children with SMS often require several forms of support, including physical therapy, behaviour therapy, occupational therapy, and speech therapy. Support is often required throughout an affected person's lifetime.

Medication is often used to address some symptoms. Melatonin supplements and trazodone are commonly used to regulate sleep disturbances. In combination with exogenous melatonin, blockade of endogenous melatonin production during the day by the adrenergic antagonist acebutolol can increase concentration, improve sleep and sleep timing and aid in improvement of behaviour. Other medications (such as risperidone) are sometimes used to regulate violent behavior.

== Eponym ==
The eponym Smith–Magenis refers to two scientists who described the condition in 1986, namely, Ann C. M. Smith, a genetic counselor at the National Institutes of Health, and R. Ellen Magenis, a pediatrician, medical geneticist, and cytogeneticist at the Oregon Health Sciences University.

== See also ==
- Serine hydroxymethyltransferase
- Charcot–Marie–Tooth disease
- Potocki–Lupski syndrome
- Prader–Willi syndrome
