= Nathan Bryan (scientist) =

American biochemist and author

Nathan Bryan is an American biochemist, entrepreneur, and author specializing in nitric oxide.

== Education ==
According to the American Academy of Anti-Aging Medicine, Bryan earned his Bachelor of Science degree in biochemistry from the University of Texas at Austin. He obtained a Doctor of Philosophy from the Louisiana State University School of Medicine in Shreveport, during which he was recognized by the Academy with the Dean's Award for Excellence in Research.

== Career ==
Bryan received post-doctoral training as a Kirschstein Fellow at Boston University School of Medicine within the Whitaker Cardiovascular Institute. His skills led to his recruitment in 2006 by Ferid Murad, a Nobel Laureate in Medicine or Physiology, to join the faculty at the University of Texas Health Science Center at Houston.

Throughout the past two decades, Bryan has conducted nitric oxide research, resulting in numerous seminal discoveries. His work has translated into the issuance of dozens of patents in the United States and internationally.

== Books ==
Bryan has co-edited or written three books: Food, Nutrition & The Nitric Oxide Pathway, Nitrates and Nitrites in Human Health and Disease, and Blood & Tissue Nitric Oxide Products.
