= Fan (person) =

Enthusiastically devoted person

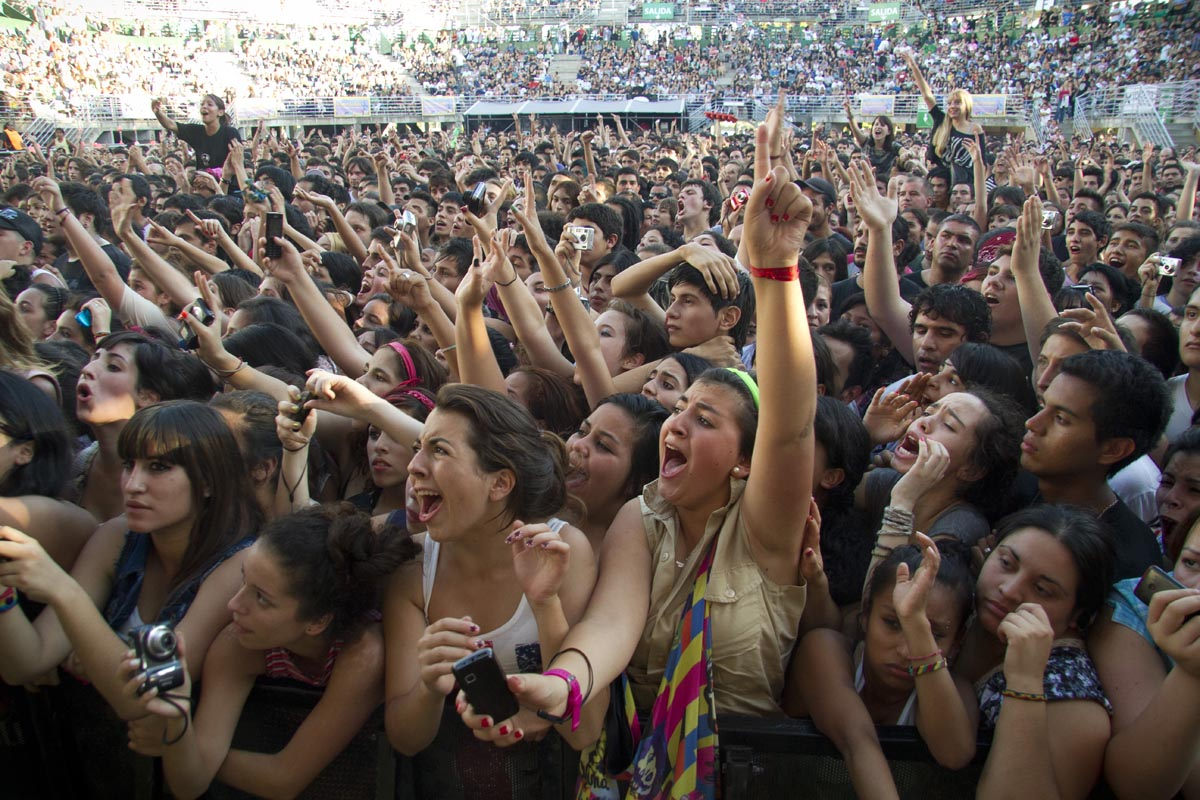
Fans at a recital in Buenos Aires, Argentina

A fan or fanatic, sometimes also termed an aficionado or enthusiast, is a person who exhibits strong interest or admiration for something or somebody, such as a celebrity, a sport, a sports team, a genre, a politician, a book, a television show, a movie, a video game or an entertainer. Collectively, the fans of a particular object or person constitute its fanbase or fandom. They may show their enthusiasm in a variety of ways, such as by promoting the object of their interest, being members of a related fan club, holding or participating in fan conventions or writing fan mail. They may also engage in creative activities ("fan labor") such as creating fanzines, writing fan fiction, making memes, drawing fan art, or developing fan games. Some excessively avid fans are called "stans".

== Etymology ==
Merriam-Webster, the Oxford dictionary and other sources define "fan" as a shortened version of the word fanatic. Fanatic itself, introduced into English around 1550, means "marked by excessive enthusiasm and often intense uncritical devotion". It comes from the Modern Latin fanaticus, meaning "insanely but divinely inspired". The word originally pertained to a temple or sacred place [Latin fanum, poetic English fane]. The modern sense of "extremely zealous" dates from around 1647; the use of fanatic as a noun dates from 1650. However, the term "fancy" for an intense liking of something (a usage attested by 1545), while being of a different etymology, coincidentally carries a less intense but somewhat similar connotation to "fanatic".

Use of "the fancy" to mean avid sports enthusiasts emerged as an Americanism in the mid-19th century. The Dickson Baseball Dictionary cites William Henry Nugent's work asserting that it was derived from the fancy, a term referring to the fans of a specific hobby or sport from the early 18th century to the 19th, especially to the followers of boxing. According to that theory, it was originally shortened to fance then just to the homonym fans. The Great American Baseball Scrapbook attributes the term to Chris von der Ahe, owner of the Saint Louis Brown Stockings in 1882. Von der Ahe sold tickets for 25 cents, hoping the many patrons would purchase his beer; the low ticket price helped him lead the stats in attendance. He called the fanatics filling his stands "fans".

Supporter is a synonym for "fan" that predates the latter term and is still commonly used in British English, especially to denote fans of sports teams. However, the term "fan" has become popular throughout the English-speaking world, including the United Kingdom. The term supporter is also used in a political sense in the United States, for a fan of a politician, a political party and a controversial issue.

== Characteristics ==
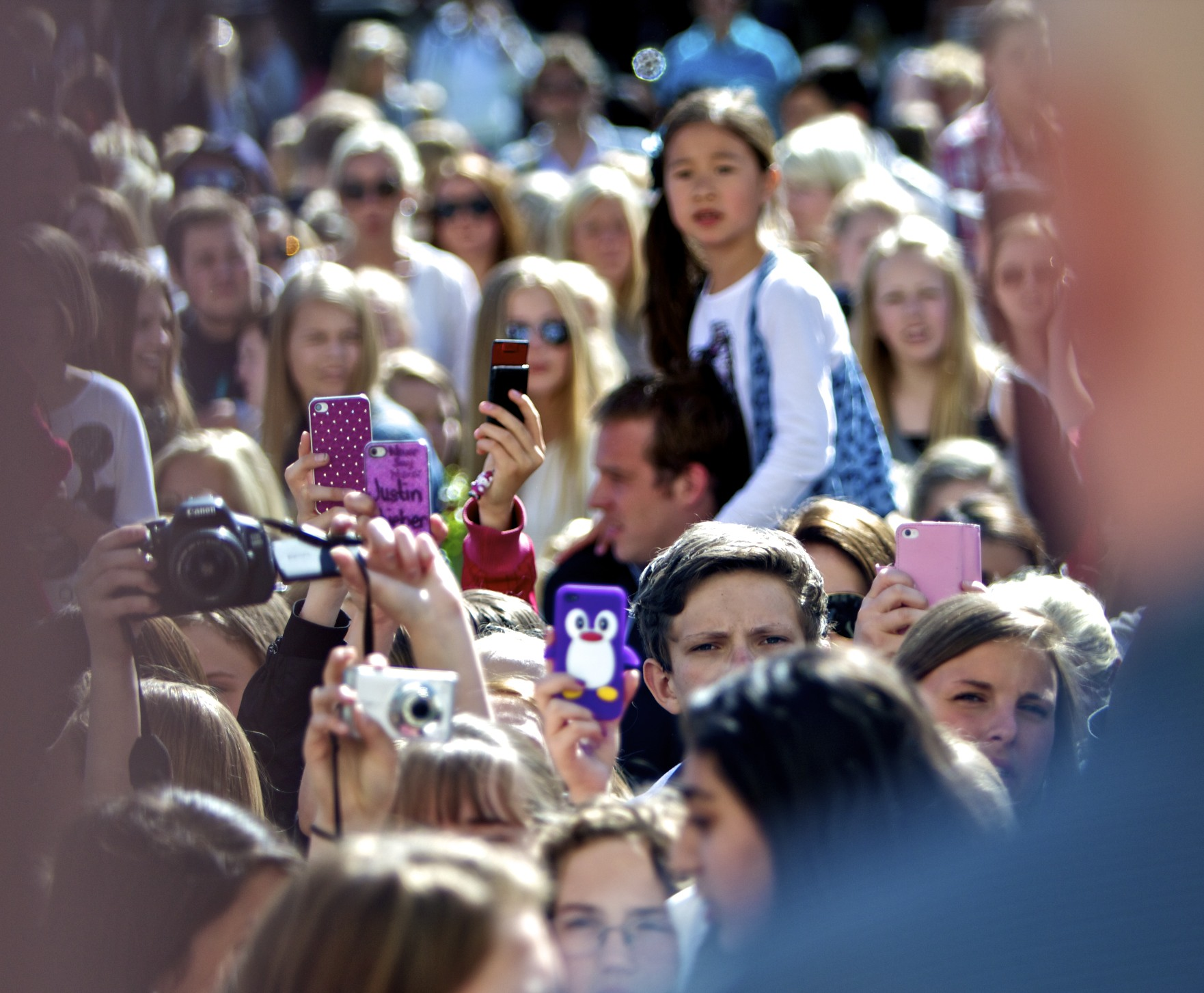
"Beliebers", the fans of Justin Bieber, gathering around the hotel where Bieber is supposed to be inside in Oslo, Norway on 30 May 2012.

Fans usually have a strong enough interest that some even go as far as to make severe changes in their lifestyles in order to accommodate devotion to the focal object. Fans have a desire for external involvement – they are motivated to demonstrate their involvement with the area of interest through certain behaviors (attending conventions, posting online, displaying team banners outside their homes, etc.). Fans often have a "wish to acquire" material objects related to the area of interest, such as a baseball hit by a famous slugger or a used guitar pick from their musical hero. As well, some fans have a desire for social interaction with other fans. This again may take many forms, from casual conversation, e-mail, chat rooms, and electronic mailing lists to regular face-to-face meetings such as fan club meetings and organized conventions.

There are several groups of fans that can be differentiated by the intensity level of their level of involvement or interest in the hobby (level of fanaticism). The likelihood for a subject of interest to be elevated to the level of fandom appears to be dictated by its complexity. Complexity allows further involvement of fans for a longer period of time because of the time needed to work the subject of interest 'out.' It also contributes to a greater sense of belonging because of the mental effort invested in the subject.

== Types ==
=== Celebrities ===
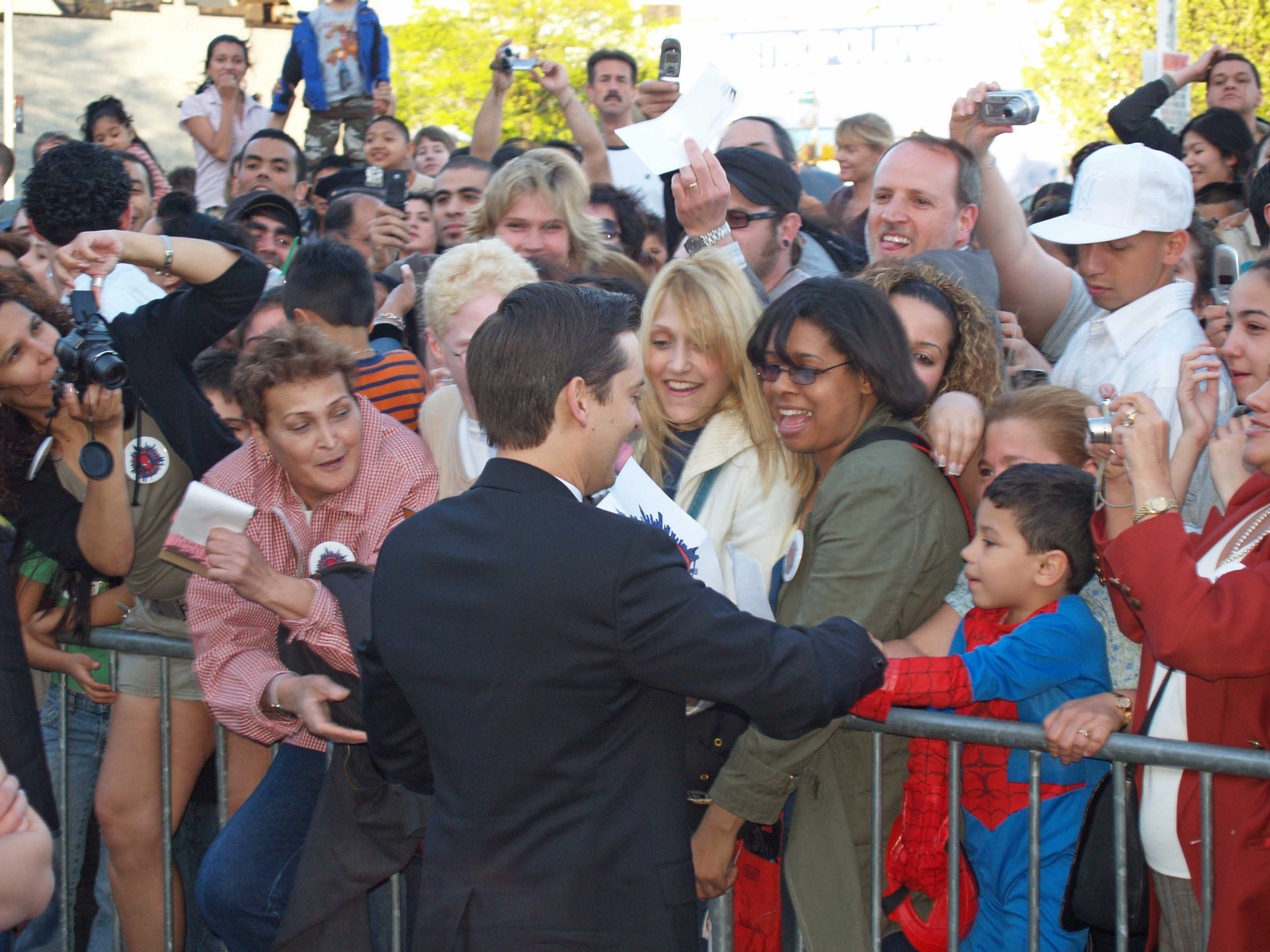
Tobey Maguire greets fans at Spider-Man 3 premiere.

These fans will often hold a crush on a major movie star, pop star, athlete or celebrity (see teen idol). The groupie is an example, a fan of a particular band or musician, who will follow them on concert tours. The degree of devotion to celebrities can range from a simple crush to the deluded belief that they have a special relationship with the star which does not exist. In extreme cases, this can lead to celebrity worship syndrome or stalking behavior. This can easily switch to hatred of the previously loved celebrity, and result in attempts at violent attacks; one notable incident being the death of Rebecca Schaeffer by a stalking fan, Robert John Bardo, in 1989.

The latter is somewhat related to the concept of parasocial interaction where audiences develop one-sided relationships with media personalities and celebrities.

Not all fans have a crush on their idols. There are also fans who want to become their friends or respect an idol's relationship. In fact, there are fans who idolize celebrity couples.

=== Gaming ===
Gaming fans, or "gamers", are fans focused on playing non-sport games, usually role-playing games, board games, miniature wargames, collectible card games or video games.

=== Music ===
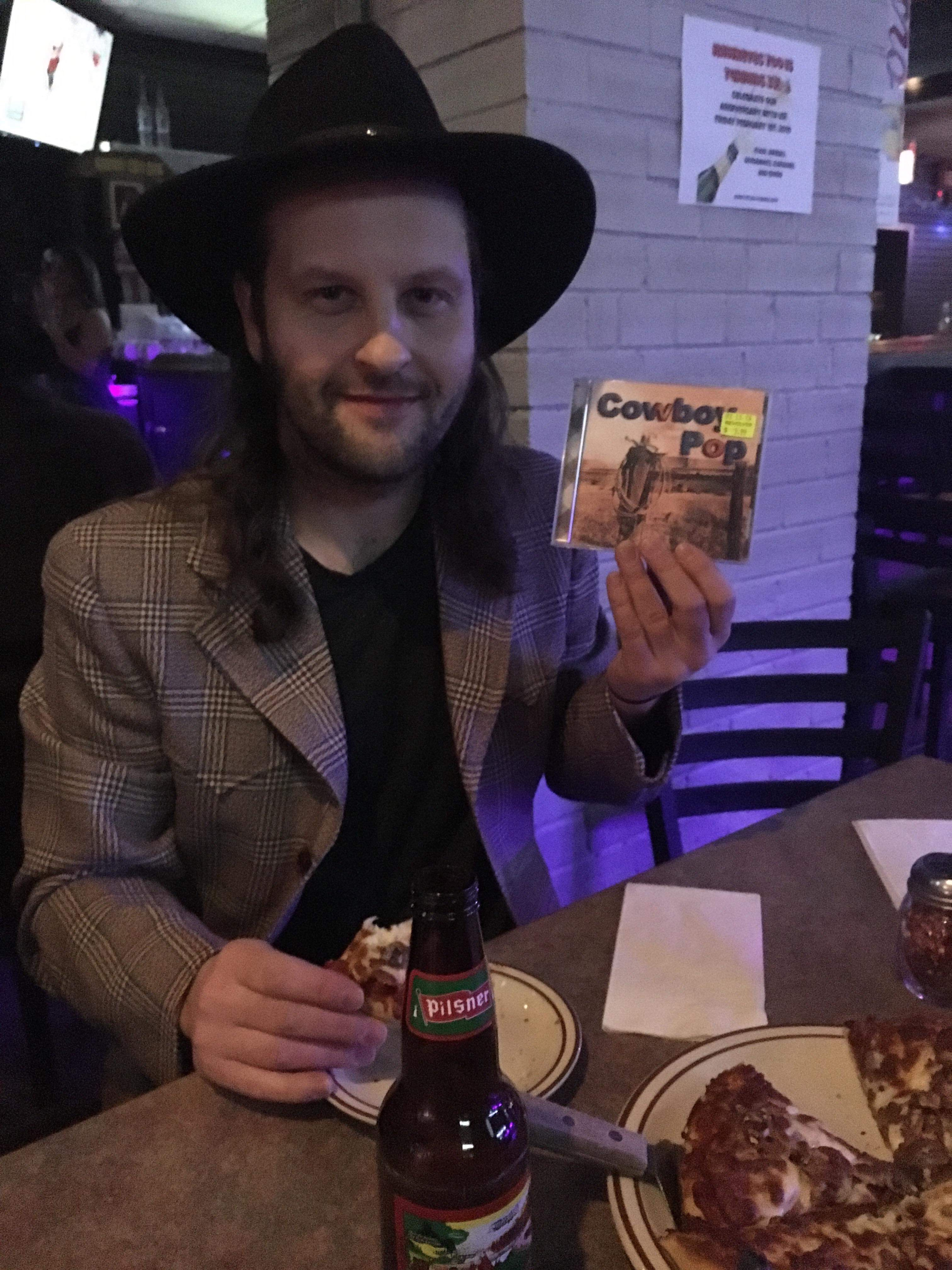
A cowboy pop fan shows off a rare CD at a music festival.

Music fans can differ somewhat from fans of particular musicians, in that they may focus on a genre of music. Many of the trade journals around music, such as Rolling Stone, were created by music fans. A notable music fan was groupie Cynthia Plaster Caster, famous for making numerous plaster casts of rock stars' penises. Another was Pamela Des Barres, author of the book I'm With The Band. In the 1960s, the extreme frenzy of music fans surrounding the Beatles became known as Beatlemania. In 2019, Billboard observed that popular musicians such as Tyler, the Creator had leveraged the power of fans to drive digital downloads using merchandise bundles. Similarly, GQ recognized Vampire Weekend for their commitment to extensive band merchandising for dedicated fans.

==== Musicals ====
Popular musicals have their own particular sets of fans. Rent has boasted a sizable number of 'Rentheads' since its Broadway debut. Similarly, fans devoted to The Phantom of the Opera have been dubbed 'Phans'. In 2018, Playbill included The Phantom of the Opera in its list of the "Top 10 Musical Fandoms" of the year.

=== Otaku ===
Otaku is a Japanese term for people with obsessive interests. In Japan, the term is normally derogatory, a connotation lacking in English, where it generally refers to people in the anime and manga fandom.

=== Politics ===
People who approve of or associate themselves with certain politicians or political groups are generally called "supporters" rather than "fans", although there are politicians with official or unofficial "fan clubs". Intense and organized support for a politician may be referred to as a personality cult, particularly in authoritarian or totalitarian regimes.

=== Professional wrestling ===
Fans of professional wrestling can be divided into two groups: marks and smarks. Derived from the same term for the prey of conmen, a mark is a fan who believes that everything associated with professional wrestling is real. In contrast, a "smark" is a fan who recognizes that they are witnessing a stage-managed work ("kayfabe"), but appreciates it nonetheless, including its backstage aspects.

=== Science fiction ===
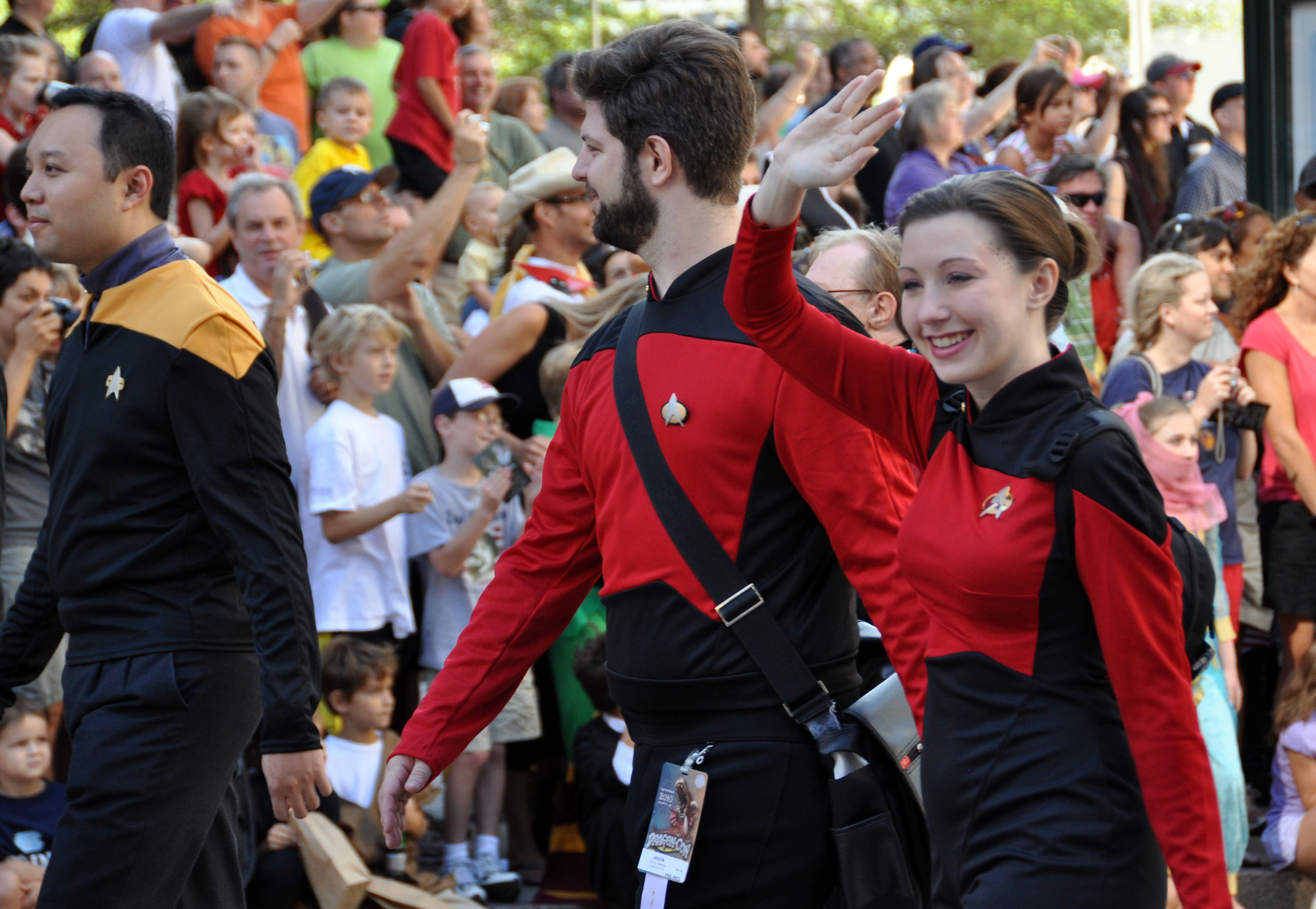
Star Trek fans cosplaying at Atlanta Dragon Con 2010

Since the 1920s, an increasingly elaborate sub-culture of organized science fiction fandom has arisen, initially among correspondents to the letter columns of science fiction magazines. This non-centralized movement has given birth to science fiction fanzines (and amateur press associations), science fiction conventions, the Hugo Awards (and various imitators/derivatives), filk music, "fan funds" such as the Trans Atlantic Fan Fund, and a variety of other institutions, jargon and customs. It has nurtured writers and artists such as Ray Bradbury, Roger Ebert, Lenny Kaye, Michael Moorcock and Trina Robbins; and has generated such spin-offs as comic book fandom, media fandom, the Society for Creative Anachronism, gaming fandom, and furry fandom, sometimes collectively referred to as "fringe fandoms".

Science fiction fandom developed its own slang, known as fanspeak after the "Newspeak" of the novel Nineteen Eighty-four. Fanspeak is made up of acronyms, blended words, obscure in-jokes, puns, coinages from science fiction novels or films, and archaic or standard English words used in specific ways relevant or amusing to the science fiction community. Some fanspeak terms, like fanzine have become standard English. Some fanspeak terms relate to fans themselves:

- An Actifan is a fan involved in "fanac" (fan activity), such as producing a fanzine or running a convention. The opposite is a Passifan, who enjoys the subject of the fandom and is not directly involved in the fandom.
- A Big Name Fan (BNF) is a fan who has become well known within fandom for their contributions of various sorts, such as chairing a Worldcon or contributing to the genre itself.
- Fanne was used in early fandom as a feminine equivalent to "fan".
- Fen was used within fandom as the plural of the word "fan", by analogy with "men" as the plural of "man". This extended to other fanspeak terms, resulting in actifen, passifen, trufen, and so forth.
- A Trufan is a very active and dedicated fan.

Specific sub-groups of science fiction fandom are often known by a collection term. For example:

- Trekkies are fans focused on the Star Trek science fiction franchise. Arising out of science fiction fandom they, to some extent, have served as a template for other organized fandoms in the science fiction television and film genres. Some "Trekkies" prefer to be referred to as "Trekkers" as they feel the term "Trekkies" was used in the past as a derogatory name for them and they hope to avoid the traditional stigma sometimes associated with being known as a "Trekkie". Many "old school" fans of the Star Trek universe defiantly, and proudly, refer to themselves, and other Star Trek fans, as "Trekkies" rather than the kinder, gentler "Trekkers" name used by many of the newer generations of Star Trek fans.
- Whovians are fans of the BBC series Doctor Who.

=== Sports ===
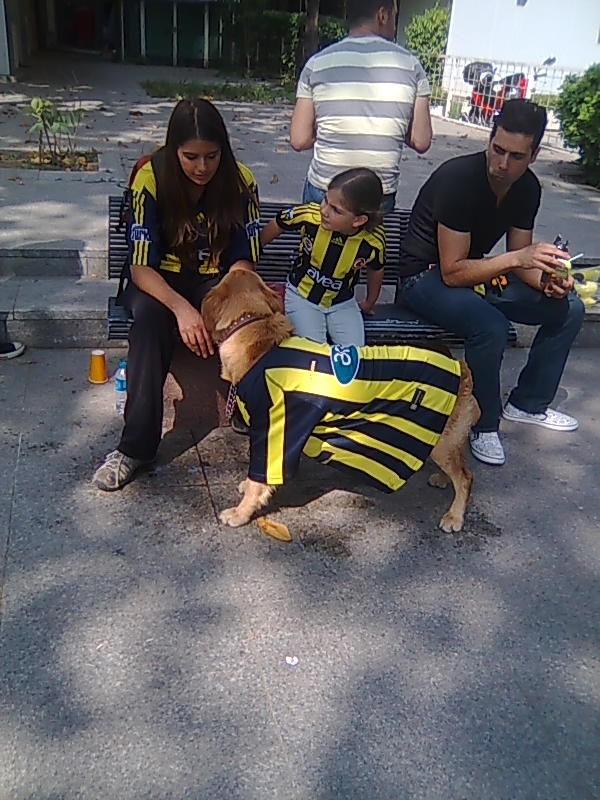
A family of Fenerbahçe S.K. supporters.

A sports fan can be an enthusiast for a particular athlete, team, sport, or all of organized sports as a whole. Sports fans often attend sporting events in stadiums, in sports bars, or watch them at home on television, and follow news through newspapers, websites, and social media.

The mentality of the sports fan is often such that they will experience a game, or event while living vicariously through players or teams whom the fan favors. This behavior manifests itself in a number of different ways, depending on the venue. At a stadium or arena, sports fans will voice their pleasure with a particular incident, player, or team by cheering, which consists of clapping, fist-pumping, or shouting positive exclamations toward the field of play and ultimately, the favorable object. Likewise, displeasure toward a particular incident, player, or team may be met by fans with booing, shouting of expletives, and sometimes throwing of objects onto the field. This violent type of fan reaction is often called hooliganism.

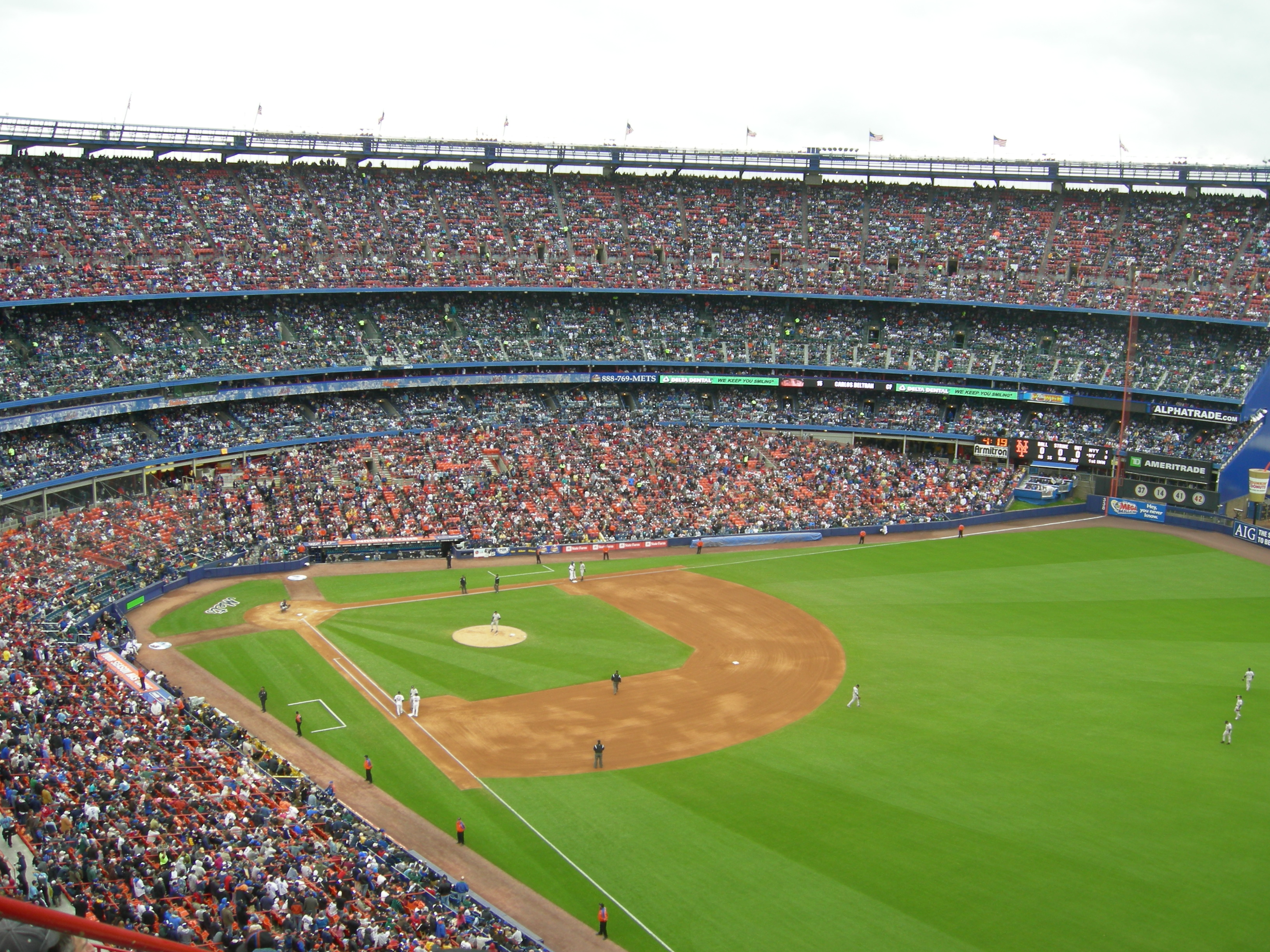
Shea Stadium filled with fans prior to the start of a New York Mets game in 2008. The stadium had the best attendance in the National League that year, garnering over 53,000 fans per game on average.

Lighter, more harmless objects are also occasionally thrown onto certain fields of play as a form of celebration of a favorable sports feat. This is most common when a member of the home team scores a hat trick in hockey. Other, more mild forms of displeasure shown by sports fans at sporting events involve simple groans of disappointment, and silence. These actions often denote that the favored home team is being outperformed by, or has lost to the much less-favored road team.

In North America, extremely enthusiastic fans are often called "superfans": fans who dress up in outrageous and ostentatious costumes or outfits showing their devotion. Fanbases well known for their tenacious love and undying support are called rabid fans or fanatics. These fans often congregate hours before kickoff in what is known as a tailgation or tailgating.

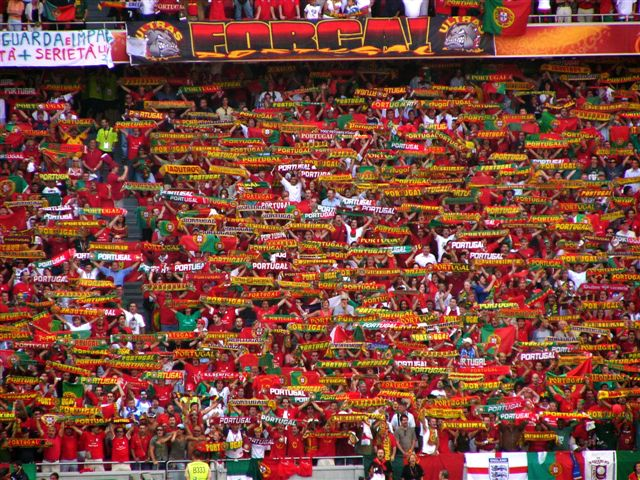
Fans of the Portugal national football team at the 2004 European Championship

At sports bars, sports fans will gather together, often while consuming food and alcoholic beverages, with the purpose of following a particular sporting event on television as a group. Sports bars often advertise in hopes of drawing fans of a particular player or team to watch together to increase bonds between fans and prevent fights. This can create the sense of unity in a sports bar as all cheers and boos will appear to be synchronized due to similar feelings and reactions by nearly all fans at the fortunes and misfortunes of the favored team or athlete. Due to the level of devotion and intensity of feeling towards the favored team or athlete by sports bar patrons, as well as partially due to the alcohol being served, behavior that would be seen as unruly or fanatical outside a sports bar is generally more common inside of one. The intensity of cheering and jeering at a sports bar by sports fans can often range from equal to stronger than that of fans actually at the sporting event for particularly significant games and matches.

At home, sports fans may have few fellow fans but also more freedom. This is sometimes where the most intense cheering or jeering will take place. In the fan's own home, unbridled and lengthy screaming, crying, acts of destruction to household objects, and other manifestations of joy or anguish, are perhaps seen as more acceptable in comparison to the sports bar or a sporting venue simply because such acts taken to such an extreme can be seen as disruptive to a large number of fellow fans even if they share the same sentiment if it is of less intensity. The greatest variables of the reaction of a sports fan in their own home are the intensity of the fan's desire to see their team win or perform well, and the presence of another: often a wife, children, or friends who may be significantly less ardent sports fans or not sports fans at all, which may significantly temper the fan's reaction to a highly positive or negative moment due to the fear of causing a scene or scaring those close to the fan, or alienating themselves from said others. Often sports fans will invite other fans of relatively similar rooting intensity over to their house to experience a sporting event together so that all involved can voice pleasure or displeasure to their heart's content and increase shared bonds in the process. It is becoming common for this type of bonding to take place over sports-related social networks.

== Fan psychology and motives ==
=== Sports ===
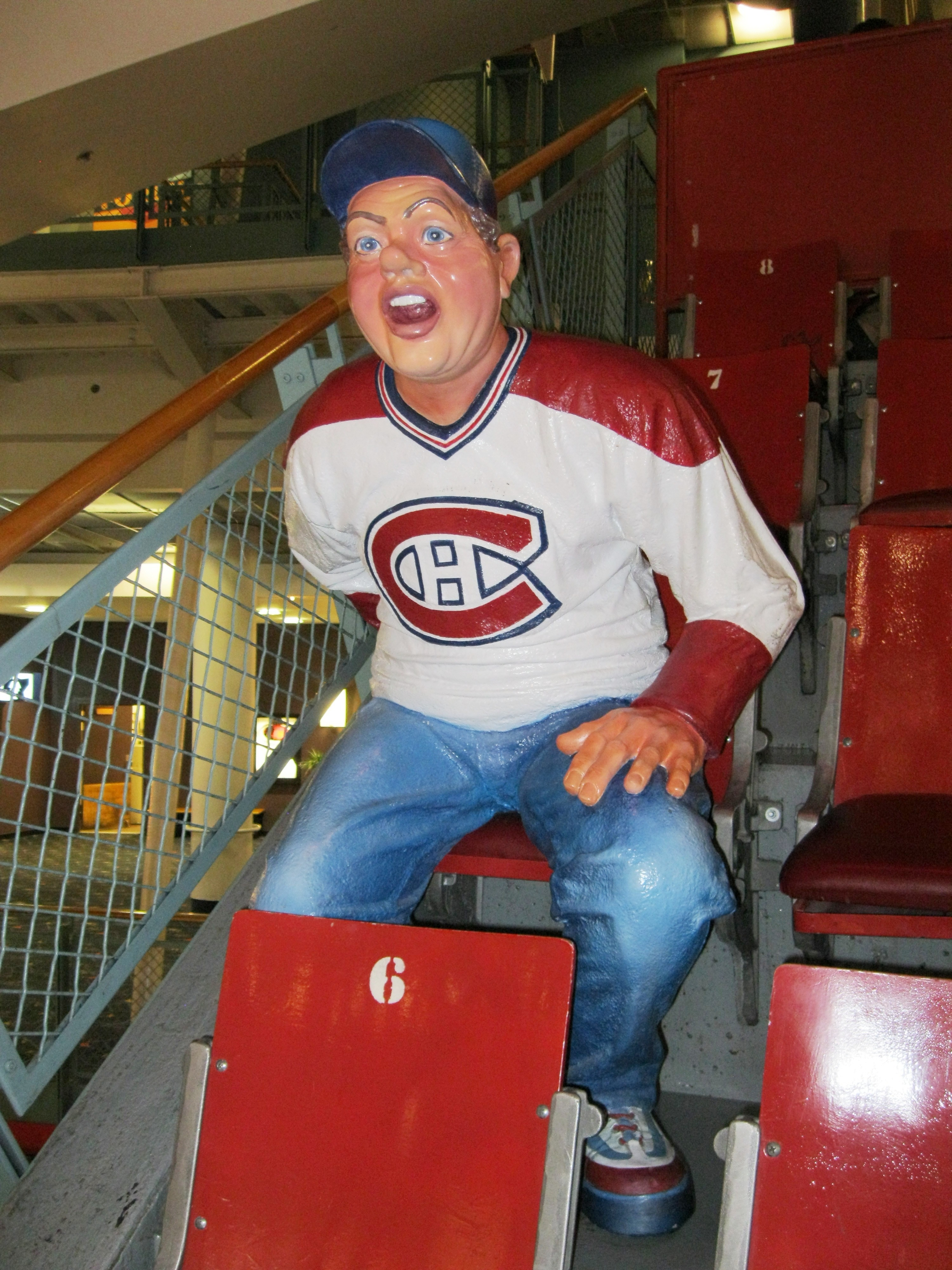
Representation of a hockey fan

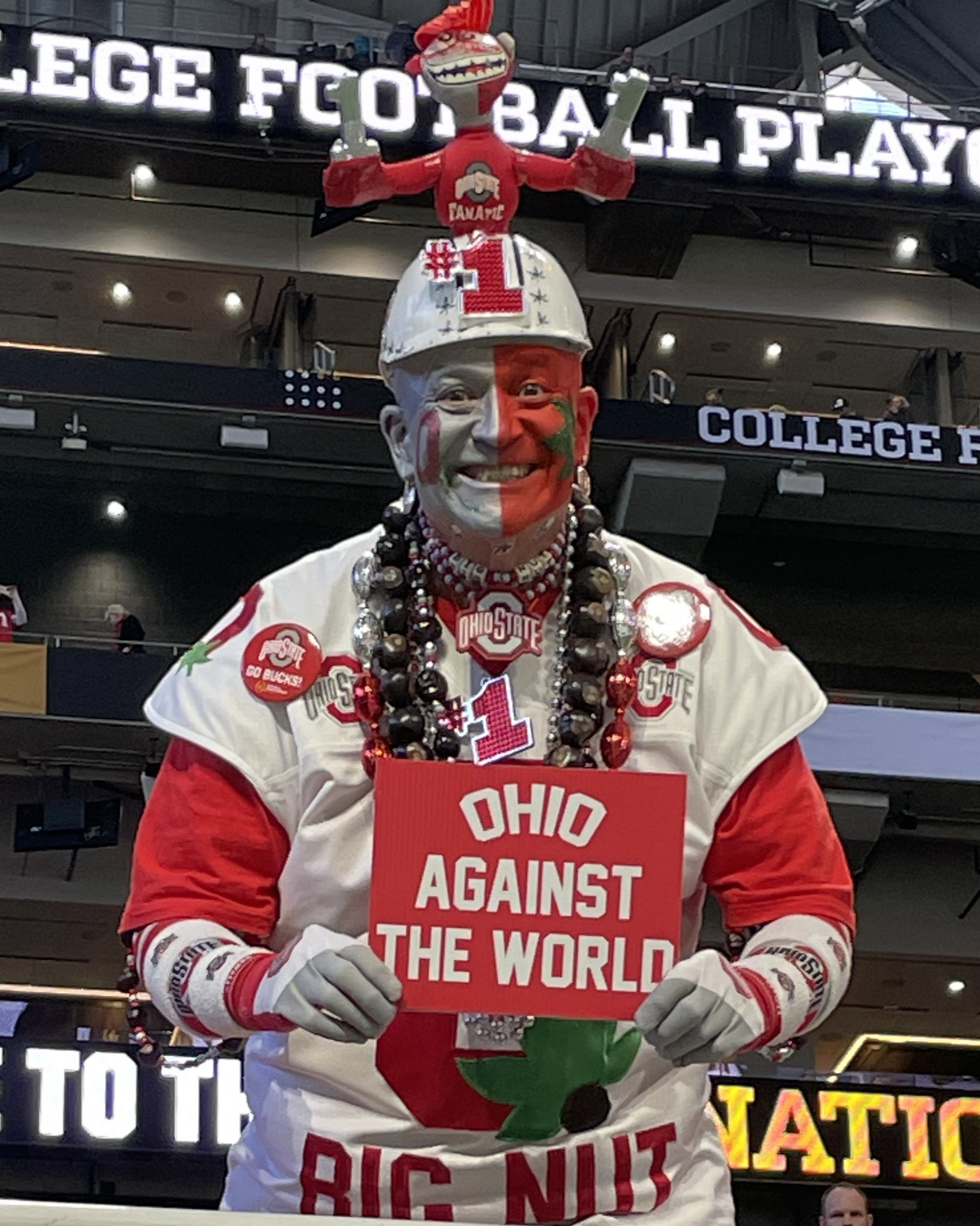
"Big Nut" is a noted fan of the Ohio State Buckeyes sports teams.

The drivers that make people fans, and in particular sports fans, have been studied by psychologists, such as Dan Wann at Murray State University, and communication scholars, such as Adam Earnheardt at Youngstown State University.

They attribute people becoming fans to the following factors: One element is entertainment, because sports spectatorship is a form of leisure. Sports is also a form of escapism, and being a fan gives one an excuse to yell at something, an activity that may be constrained in other areas of one's life. Fan activities give participants a combination of euphoria and stress (about the potential for their team to lose) for which they coin the name "eustress". Fans experience euphoria during moments when play is going well for their team, and stress when play is going against their team. This tension between the two emotions generates an unusual sense of pleasure or heightened sensations.

Aesthetics are another draw for some fans, who appreciate the precision or skill of play, or of the coordinated movement of the players during a pre-planned "play". Family bonding is a reason for some fan activities. Some families watch televised sports on a regular basis and go to sports games as a family outing to watch events and form a psychological bond with one another and as a family. Others with no biological relations may view the team and fanbase as their family as Arsenal fan Maria Petri stated. Going to sports events can create a borrowed sense of self-esteem if fans identify with their teams to the extent that they consider themselves to be successful when their teams have been successful (e.g., as seen in the phrase "we have won"). If a fan identifies strongly with a favorite team, they will respond to the performance of the team as if team success were a personal success and team failure a personal failure.

=== Loyalty ===
Fan loyalty is the loyalty felt and expressed by a fan towards the object of their fanaticism. Allegiances can be strong or weak. The loyalties of sports fans have been studied by psychologists and have often been reviewed.

Fangirls and fanboys in fandoms sometimes, with various meanings, consider their fandom to be their "family", and feel very loyal to it, usually.

According to a study by psychologists from Cambridge University, the more that people publicly express admiration for a public figure, the more likely it is that the fans' faith in the public figure will remain unaffected following "moral violations" by the adored person.

=== "Stan" fans ===
A stan is an excessively avid fan and supporter of a celebrity, television show, group, musical artist, film or film series. The object of the stan's affection is often called "bias" or "fave". The term comes from the 2000 song "Stan" by American rapper Eminem, which tells the story of an obsessive and delusional fan. The term has frequently been used to describe artist devotees whose fanaticism matches the severity of the obsessive character in the song. The word is sometimes described as a portmanteau of "stalker" and "fan", but this has never been confirmed. A website known as "Stan Wars" or "stanipedia" sprouted up to host discussions and flame wars between rival fanbases. Stan culture has been criticized for being toxic and parasocial. In South Korea, obsessive fans are known as sasaengs.

==== Usage ====
Colloquially, the term can be used as both a noun or a verb. Stans of a particular artist are often given more detailed names, such as "Arianators" for fans of Ariana Grande, "Directioner" for fans of One Direction, "Katycats" for fans of Katy Perry, and "Swifties" for fans of Taylor Swift. Some artists, however, do not have specific titles attributed to their stans; fans of Kylie Minogue have been called Kylie Stans. Even for fandoms with specific titles, the "artist stan" formula still applies.

Some of these monikers are almost universally known and used by fans of the artists as well as outsiders. Other nicknames are not commonly used, neither by outsiders nor by the concerning fan-base, such as Kylie Minogue's "Kylie Stans", Madonna's "Madonna Fans", Maroon 5's "Maroon 5 Stans" or Nick Jonas's so called "Nick Jonas Fans", usually appearing on social media networks such as Twitter and Tumblr, The term "stan" is also used to describe fans of K-pop. The term is not to be confused with Sasaeng fans, which are overly obsessed fans who stalk and sometimes bring harm to idols.

The term was added to the Oxford English Dictionary in 2017.

==== Celebrity reaction ====
Celebrities have positively reacted to their "stan" followings. Notably, English singer-songwriter Jessie J had this to say about her stans, "They support me and buy my albums and singles, and they stand outside hotels, and they come to shows, and they get tattoos of my lyrics and they cut their hair like me. You have to love your fans. That's why I call them my Heartbeats, because without them I wouldn't be here". In 2012, after Jessie J broke her leg, a stan broke her own leg to emulate the injury. The fan tracked down Jessie J's personal address and sent her a photograph of the self-inflicted injury. The singer was horrified and decided to increase her security.

Singer-songwriter Lorde has a different opinion on the matter of giving her followers a nickname. She discouraged it by saying "I find it grating to lump everyone into a really awkward, pun-centric name" and affirmed she will never name her fanbase.

== Gender stereotypes ==
=== Societal gender roles ===
==== Discrimination against women ====
Women tend to be "more restricted in their leisure choices and opportunities than men," and their experiences within fandoms are typically demeaned to a more sexualized, emotional, or bodily experience, as opposed to intellectual interests. For example, in music, women are more predominant, and accepted, within pop music fandoms, which Diane Railton describes as evoking an emotional and physical response, in contrast with the 'masculine' rock music, which is defined as 'serious' music with a 'meaning', focusing on political, cultural, and psychological discussion. Due to this, women are rarely given space or voice within the intellectual realm of music. According to Frank Zappa, "men come to hear the music and chicks come for the sex thrills," implying that women's involvement in fan communities is purely sexual, and that they are incapable of displaying intellectual or artistic interest in the music itself. Those who do manage to become involved within the world of 'serious' music are often relegated to the realm of a 'groupie'. A groupie, according to Cheryl Cline, is

[A] person (a woman, usually), who 'chases after' rock stars, as my mother would say. But 'groupie' is also used more or less synonymously with 'girl Rock fan', 'female journalist', and 'woman Rock musician'; it's used to mean anyone working in the music field who isn't actually a Rock musician; it's used as an all-purpose insult and a slut on one's professionalism; it's used as a cute term for 'hero worship'; and it's used interchangeably with 'fan'.

In other words, the term 'groupie' (used synonymously with the term 'fan' or 'fangirl') is frequently used to shame women involved within the music community, restricting their involvement to sexual relations with band members or worshipping male rock stars.

This trend can also be observed within other fan communities, such as comic book fandoms, where women are frequently portrayed as "Fake Geek Girls", only interested in comic books to impress guys or to view the attractive men present within their content, or sports communities, where women are often made uncomfortable at live sporting events due to the overt sexism and aggressive masculinity displayed by male spectators, and then labelled as 'inauthentic' for viewing the games via television instead. Within hockey, female fans are often called "Puck Bunnies", defined as,

[S]omeone who hangs around the players, always on the lookout for the chance to get that autograph / photograph / quick pint [drink] / quick knee trem-bler round the back of the Arena from the player or players (or even coach) of their choice, heck let's face it even the water carrier is in with a chance here.

Such discrimination against female fans can become violent at times in an effort to police "authenticity". The recent events known as GamerGate provide a good example of such attacks, whereby multiple women working within the gaming industry were victims of sexual harassment and violent threats, some even forced to leave their homes for fear of a physical confrontation.

The fangirls', often stereotyped as female, so-called 'hysteria' is described as the product of sexual repression. However, while it is expected for women to be involved in certain fandoms for physical or sexual reasons, this is also viewed as undesirable and driven by hormonal changes.

These acts of adoration are societally limited to adolescent youth or menopausal women, in both instances blaming "these two periods of hormonal lunacy" for the irrational, overtly sexual behaviour. For instance, Cheryl Cline, in her text entitled "Essays from Bitch: The Women's Rock Newsletter with Bite", discusses how women need to keep their interests hidden once they pass adolescence. In her own words, "[i]t's a sign of maturity to pack up all the posters, photos, magazines, scrapbooks, and unauthorized biographies you so lovingly collected and shove them in the back of the closet."

These conflicting accounts of fangirl behaviour are due to the belief that women are not supposed to express such sexual fantasies unless influenced by some hormonal induced craziness, while for men it is normal to be sexual regardless of age. As Cheryl Cline summarizes,

It's much easier for a man to be indulgent about the crushes of teenage girls than it is for him to be fair-minded about the sexual fantasies of the woman he loves when they're about someone else. And the same guy who'll leave Penthouse in the bathroom will yell, 'No woman of mine is gonna hang a poster of Prince naked to the waist on the inside of the closet of the spare room where no one will see it!' […] [U]ntil you reach the age when everybody thinks you're crazy anyway, so why not admit to an intense hankering to run your fingers through Willie Nelson's whiskers?

==== Discrimination against males ====
According to Jackson Katz in the documentary Tough Guise 2, boys are taught early on that to be "real men" they need to be tough and not to show their feelings.

[Men] can't show any emotion except anger. We can't think too much or seem too intellectual. We can't back down when someone disrespects us. We have to show we're tough enough to inflict physical pain and take it in turn. We're supposed to be sexually aggressive with women. And then we're taught that if we step out of this box, we risk being seen as soft, weak, feminine, or gay.

He later elaborates, stating that,

Qualities like compassion, caring, empathy, intellectual curiosity, fear, vulnerability, even love – basic human qualities that boys have inside them every bit as much as girls do – get methodically driven out of them by a sexist and homophobic culture that labels these things as 'unmanly,' 'feminine,' 'womanly,' and 'gay,' and teaches boys to avoid them at all costs. And, most importantly, they're taught that real men turn to violence not as a last resort, but as the go-to method of resolving disputes – and also as a primary means of winning respect and establishing masculine credibility.

In the predecessor to this documentary, Tough Guise, Katz also addresses the issue of body image, using multiple movies, such as Terminator and Rambo, as well as action figures like G.I. Joe, to illustrate how 'real men' are defined as big, strong, and muscular.

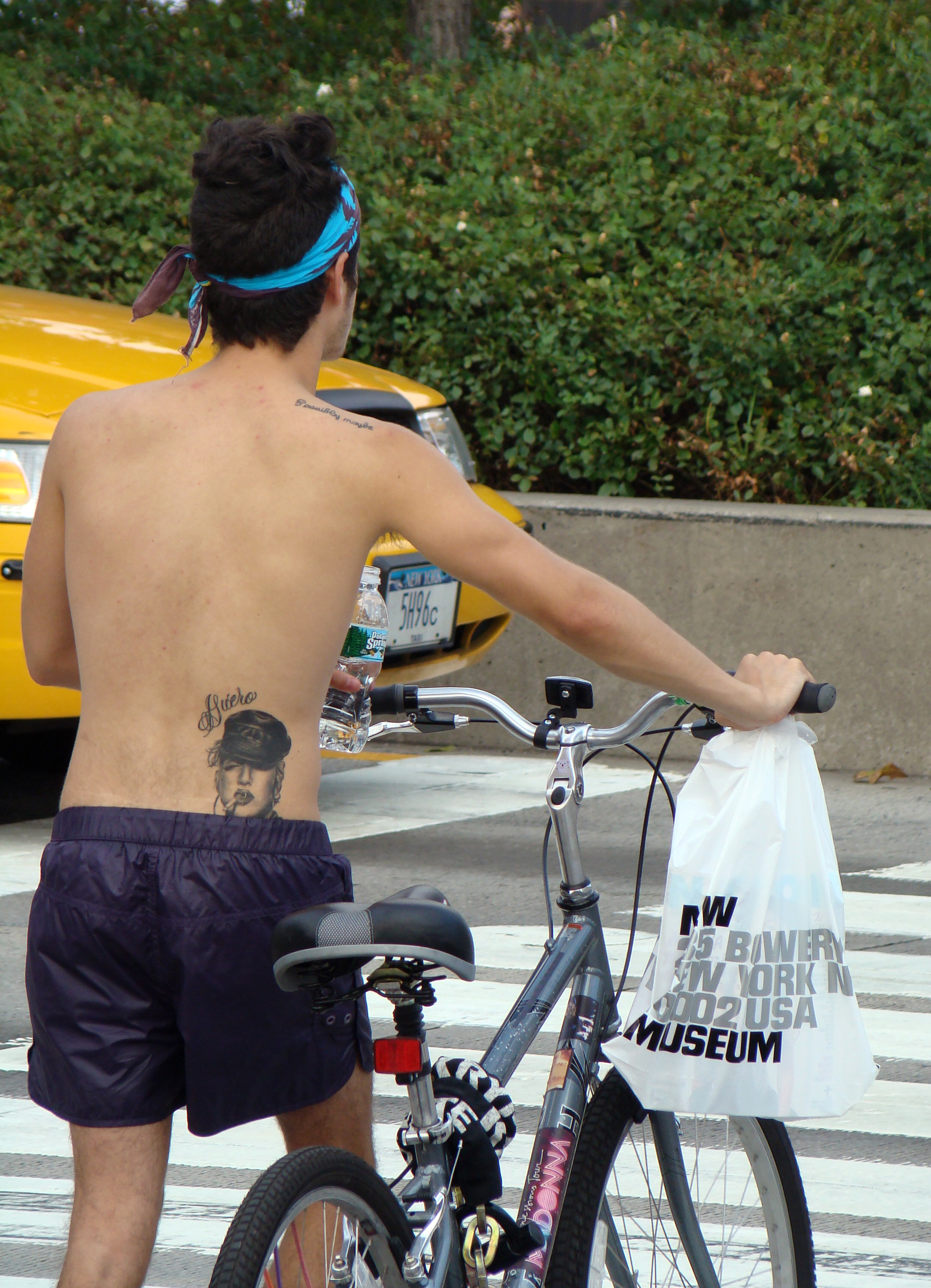
A man with a tattoo of Madonna on his back pushing a bicycle with a "Madonna" sticker. On his shoulder is a tattoo of the words "possibly maybe", which is the title of a song by Björk.

Fanboy portrayals, by definition, do not fit into this mold of a 'real man', with the exception of sports fans. In a study by Gerard Jones on comic book fans, he described the comic book fanboys as "small, anxious, withdrawn, and terrified of the opposite sex." Quite the opposite of the 'real man' previously described by Katz. Their interests may also be considered as a deviation from societal gender roles, according to Noah Berlastsky, such as playing Dungeons & Dragons instead of football. This lack of traditional masculine traits warrants them much teasing from peers, parental figures, coaches, or older male role models for not conforming to these ideas of masculinity. A popular example of such treatment in mainstream media is shown on the sitcom The Big Bang Theory, where, multiple times throughout the show's run, the four main characters, portrayed as 'nerdy fanboys', are humiliated by larger 'real men'. For instance, in the show pilot, the two main characters, Leonard and Sheldon, get their pants taken by the main female character's ex-boyfriend, who is portrayed as big, strong, tough, confident, and successful with women.

Furthermore, fanboys also deal with issues of gender discrimination in relation to their fandom interests. For example, Bronies, a group of young men enthralled by the television show My Little Pony: Friendship Is Magic, a show typically geared towards young girls, are often the target of ridicule. Their interest in a 'feminine' media item can be the cause of great shame, causing many to become 'private' bronies, enjoying the show in secret out of fear.

=== Fangirl ===
In English, the term "fangirl" typically implies a young female fan. The term is often used in a demeaning, derogatory fashion and is said to describe the fans that give "normal" fans a bad name. In fact, the term "fangirling" is used to describe anyone who obsessively follows a certain fandom to the point where it interferes with their daily lives. Such a trend of 'authentic' versus 'inauthentic' fan is common within fan communities, and is particularly pertinent to gender discrimination and misogynistic ideals. However, on the other hand of the spectrum, some fangirls have embraced the title, considering it a compliment rather than a derogatory term.

==== Immaturity in fangirls ====
In terms of their involvement within fandoms, fangirls are typically portrayed as losing all control, fainting, sobbing, and dashing about in mobs. For instance, while describing the phenomenon of Beatlemania, fan activity is described by stating that:

The appropriate reaction to contact with [the Beatles] – such as occupying the same auditorium or city block – was to sob uncontrollably while screaming, 'I'm gonna die, I'm gonna die,' or, more optimistically, the name of a favorite Beatle, until the onset of either unconsciousness or laryngitis. Girls peed in their pants, fainted, or simply collapsed from the emotional strain.

Furthermore, while discussing Beatlemania and the crazed Beatles fangirl behaviour, Barbara Ehrenreich, Elizabeth Heiss, and Gloria Jacobs mention how the 'only cure' for what was at the time considered an affliction was age, and that similarly to "the girls who had screamed for Frank Sinatra," the Beatles fangirls would "[grow] up to be responsible, settled" individuals.

=== Fanboy ===
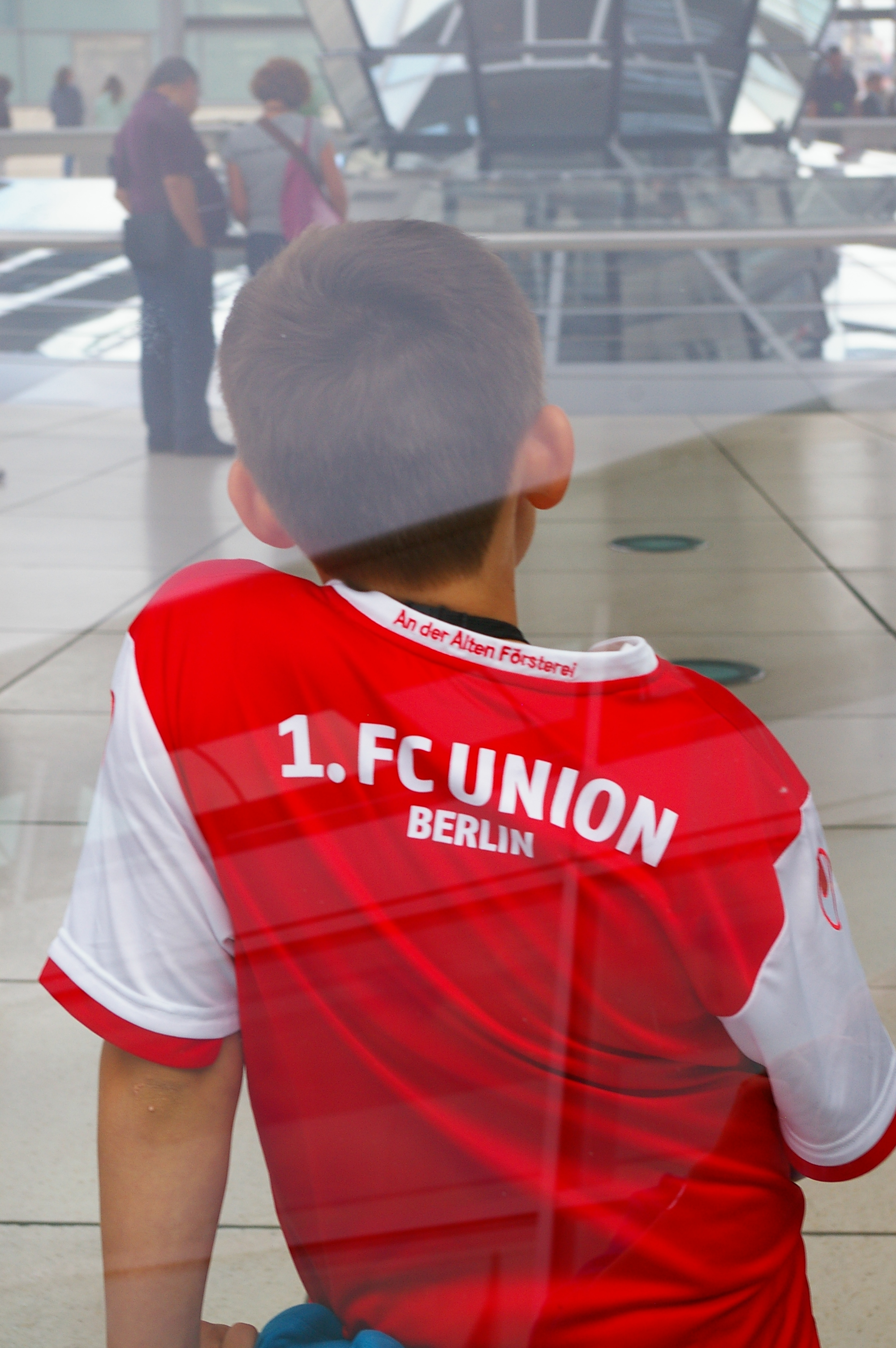
Young 1. FC Union Berlin supporter

Fanboys are frequently portrayed as "angry nerds", over-aggressive, derogatory, and protective of the object of their obsession, or as bespectacled, geekish, obsessive fans. The term nerd, defined as "[an] insignificant, foolish, or socially inept person; a person who is boringly conventional or studious; a person who pursues an unfashionable or highly technical interest with obsessive or exclusive dedication," as well as the term geek, defined as "[a] person […] who is regarded as foolish, offensive, worthless; an overly diligent, unsociable student; any unsociable person obsessively devoted to a particular pursuit," are often used to describe stereotypical fanboys. In regards to chosen fandoms, they are typically associated with comic books, video games, science fiction movies or television series, or technology (such as computer or smartphone brands).

An exception to this portrayal is the sports fan, who is expected to be overtly sexual, and aggressive. This portrayal is particularly dominant within the sports arena, which provides a legitimate site for people to act in hypermasculinized ways. According to Williams, "Many [men] want to be overtly sexist and racist. They need to have this exaggerated sense of their sexuality to defend themselves from potential accusations that they are not real men."

==== Immaturity in fanboys ====
Fanboys are often portrayed as quite angry, violent, and offensive while defending the objects of their affection, such as the smartphone fanboys who frequently verbally attack anybody saying anything the slightest bit offensive about their chosen technological product through online anonymous sites.

== See also ==
- Fan activism
- Fan art
- Fan club
- Fansite
- Fan studies
- Cult of personality
- Hooliganism
