= Laurence Jalbert =

Musical artist (born 1959)

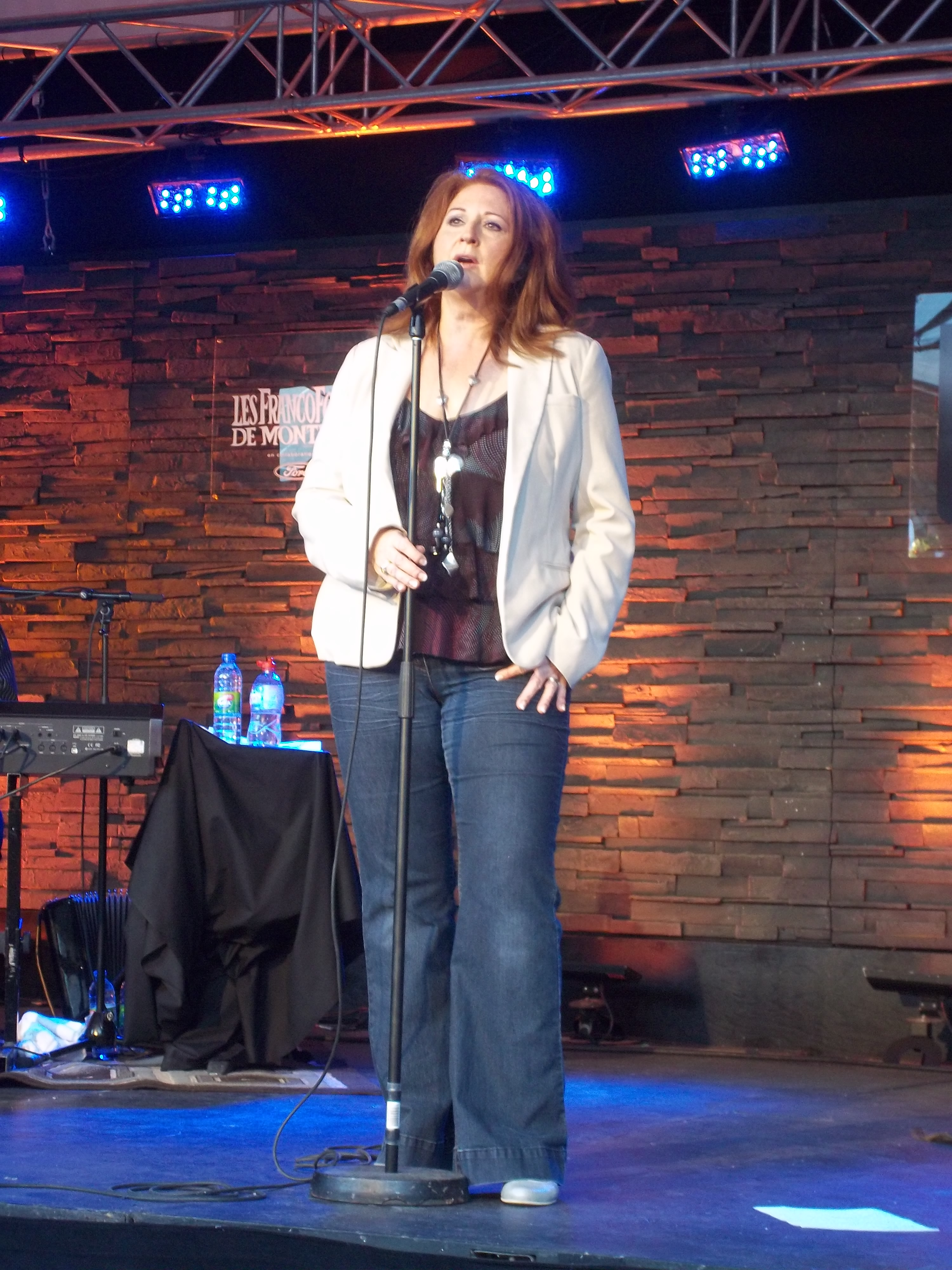
- Laurence Jalbert

Background information
- Born: Lise Jalbert; 18 August 1959 (age 66); Rivière-au-Renard, Quebec, Canada
- Genres: Pop, rock
- Instrument: Vocals
- Years active: 1985–present
- Labels: Audiogram
- Website: www.laurencejalbert.com

Laurence Jalbert (born Lise Jalbert, 18 August 1959 in Rivière-au-Renard, Quebec) is a pop and rock singer-songwriter from Quebec.

== Background ==
She began her career with the band Volt in 1985. The band won CKOI-FM's L'Empire des futures stars competition in 1987, but recorded only one single, "Nobody Knows", before breaking up in 1988. Jalbert went on to a solo career, choosing to use the stage name Laurence over her birth name Lise because she felt it better suited the strong and independent image she wanted her music to project.

== Career ==
She released her self-titled debut album in 1990. Supported by the hit single "Tomber", the album sold 26,000 copies in its first two weeks of release, and was certified platinum by 1991. In addition to her own material, her concerts in this era frequently included live covers of songs such as Jefferson Airplane's "White Rabbit", Patti Smith's "Because the Night", Kate Bush's "Wuthering Heights", and Janis Joplin's "Take Another Little Piece of My Heart".

At the Gala de l'ADISQ in September 1990, Jalbert won two Prix Félix, for Best Newcomer and Best Video for "Tomber". In 1992, she was again a Félix nominee for Best Song, for the single "À toi".

In 1993, Jalbert released her second album Corridors. Certified platinum, Corridors won two Prix Félix in 1994, for Best Pop/Rock Album and Song of the Year for "Encore et encore", and was a Juno Award nominee for Francophone Album of the Year at the Juno Awards of 1994.

She released her third album Avant le squall in 1998. At the Prix Félix that year, she again garnered three nominations for Best Female Singer, Best Pop/Rock Album and Best Song ("Pour toi"). The following year, she was again nominated for Best Female Singer.

Through 1999 and 2000, Jalbert undertook an extended concert tour in collaboration with Dan Bigras. In 2000, they released the live album Communio, which was recorded live at the Spectrum in Montreal, Quebec.

Her fifth album, ...et j'espère, was released in 2001. The album included the single "Jeter un sort", a French-language version of Michel Pagliaro's 1975 hit "What the Hell I Got", and was a Félix nominee for Pop/Rock Album of the Year in 2002.

In 2004, Audiogram released a hits compilation (Ses plus grands succès), followed by the Christmas album Noël des anges.

In 2006, she released another live album from her Évidemment tour, followed by the further studio albums Tout porte à croire (2007), Une Lettre (2011) and Ma route (2016).

In March 2019, she was one of 11 singers from Quebec, alongside Ginette Reno, Diane Dufresne, Céline Dion, Isabelle Boulay, Luce Dufault, Louise Forestier, Catherine Major, Ariane Moffatt, Marie Denise Pelletier and Marie-Élaine Thibert, who participated in a supergroup recording of Renée Claude's 1971 single "Tu trouveras la paix" after Claude's diagnosis with Alzheimer's disease was announced.

== Discography ==
- Laurence Jalbert (1990)
- Corridors (1993)
- Avant le squall (1997)
- Communio (2000, with Dan Bigras)
- ...et j'espère (2001)
- Ses plus grands succès (2004, greatest hits)
- Noël des anges (2004)
- Sur la route... Évidemment (2006, live double disc)
- Tout porte à croire (2007)
- Une lettre (2011)
- Femmes de Feu – Hommage à Pauline Julien (2013) avec Luce Dufault, Jorane et Marie-Jo Thério
- Ma route (2016)
- Au pays de Nana Mouskouri (2019) – No. 35 Canada

== Bibliography ==
- À la vie, à la mer (biography with Claude André, 2015) ISBN 978-2-89225-868-4
