= I'm with the Band =

I'm with the Band may refer to:

- I'm with the Band: Confessions of a Groupie, a 1987 book by Pamela Des Barres
- I'm with the Band: Nasty Cherry, a 2019 TV series
- "I'm with the Band", a song by Little Big Town from their album A Place to Land

== See also ==
- I'm in the Band, a 2009 TV series
