= The Mascara Snake =

American painter and musician (1948-2018)

Victor Hayden
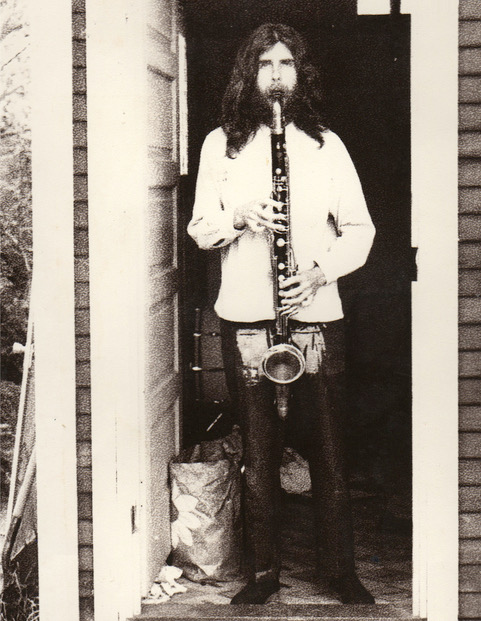
- Hayden at the house where Trout Mask Replica was rehearsed and recorded in 1968
- Born: August 16, 1948
- Died: December 7, 2018 (aged 70)
- Other name: The Mascara Snake
- Occupations: Musician, painter
- Relatives: Captain Beefheart (cousin)
- Musical career
- Instrument: Bass clarinet
- Formerly of: The Magic Band

Victor Hayden (August 16, 1948 – December 7, 2018), also known by his stage name the Mascara Snake, was an American painter and musician.

== The Magic Band ==
Hayden was a cousin of Don Van Vliet, better known as Captain Beefheart. Hayden joined Beefheart's Magic Band as guest bass clarinet player in 1968, but is heard only on the 1969 album Trout Mask Replica. He can also be heard on one of the sections of dialogue interpolated between the album's tracks, in which he and Beefheart agree that some unknown thing is "fast and bulbous". He appeared on stage with the band at the Amougies Festival in Mont-de-l'Enclus, Belgium, in October 1969, where they were recorded playing two compositions in the film Music Power.

In Pamela Des Barres' memoir I'm with the Band, she mentions that Hayden befriended her while she was in high school, introducing her to his cousin Beefheart and asking her to be the president of the local chapter of the Beefheart fan club. Also, Des Barres and Hayden worked together at a factory in Van Nuys, California, to support their love of rock music (especially the Rolling Stones, whom they eventually met). Des Barres described Hayden as "living among the Redwoods", dropping out of mainstream society completely, while also citing him as an important influence on her life.

== Later works ==
Hayden co-founded Alchemy Records in 1986 with Mark Deutrom, and worked there through 1991. From 2007 to 2018, he was the A&R Director for PIG Records. He produced records for Ever Rat Records, Subcore Records, and PIG records. While holding these positions, Hayden also created cover art for Melvins, Poison Idea, Potbelly, and the Senseless Death Compilation. As well as helping to sign Potbelly to P.I.G. Records. After having met the Mascara Snake, John Frusciante named a track "Mascara" on his first album, Niandra LaDes and Usually Just a T-Shirt. Hayden produced the painting that was used as cover art for the 1974 Beefheart album Bluejeans & Moonbeams.

After designing an advertisement for Absolut Vodka in 1991, Hayden exhibited his paintings periodically. His most notable shows were in New York City, New York in 2001; Seattle, Washington in 2004; Austin, Texas in 2011 (as part of the SXSW festival); and a show curated by Anthony Ausgang in 2019 at Lisa Derrick Fine Arts in Los Angeles.

== Death ==
Hayden died on December 7, 2018, from complications after being struck by a van.

== Discography ==
=== With the Magic Band ===
==== Studio albums ====
| Year | Title | Notes | Magic Band personnel |
|---|---|---|---|
| 1968 | Strictly Personal | Released in October 1968; Label: Blue Thumb (US), Liberty (UK) | John French; Alex St. Clair; Jeff Cotton; Jerry Handley |
| 1969 | Trout Mask Replica | Released on June 16, 1969; Label: Straight | John French; Jeff Cotton; Bill Harkleroad; Mark Boston; Victor Hayden |

==== Singles ====
| Year | Single |
|---|---|
| 1970 | "Pachuco Cadaver" / "Wild Life" |
