= Ruben De Fuentes =

American musician

- Also known as: Ruben Raven
- Born: March 15, 1953 (age 72)
- Genres: Hard rock, Heavy metal
- Occupation(s): Musician; Songwriter
- Instrument: Guitar
- Member of: Hollywood After Dark
- Formerly of: Steppenwolf; Blue Cheer; The Hollywood Stars
- Website: rubendefuentes.com

Ruben De Fuentes (also known as Ruben Raven, born March 15, 1953) is an American musician best known as a replacement guitarist for Steppenwolf from 1979–1980 and Blue Cheer. With the Hollywood Stars, he also recorded the original versions of "King of the Night time World" and "Escape", later released by Kiss and Alice Cooper, respectively.
