= Adrian Flatt hand collection =

Collection of casts of hands

The Adrian Flatt hand collection is a collection of plaster and bronze casts of human hands on display at the Baylor University Medical Center in Dallas, Texas. The casts were created by orthopedic surgeon Dr. Adrian Flatt (1921—2017), and the collection features the hands of various former United States presidents, actors, athletes, scientists, musicians, artists, astronauts, and other celebrities.

== History ==
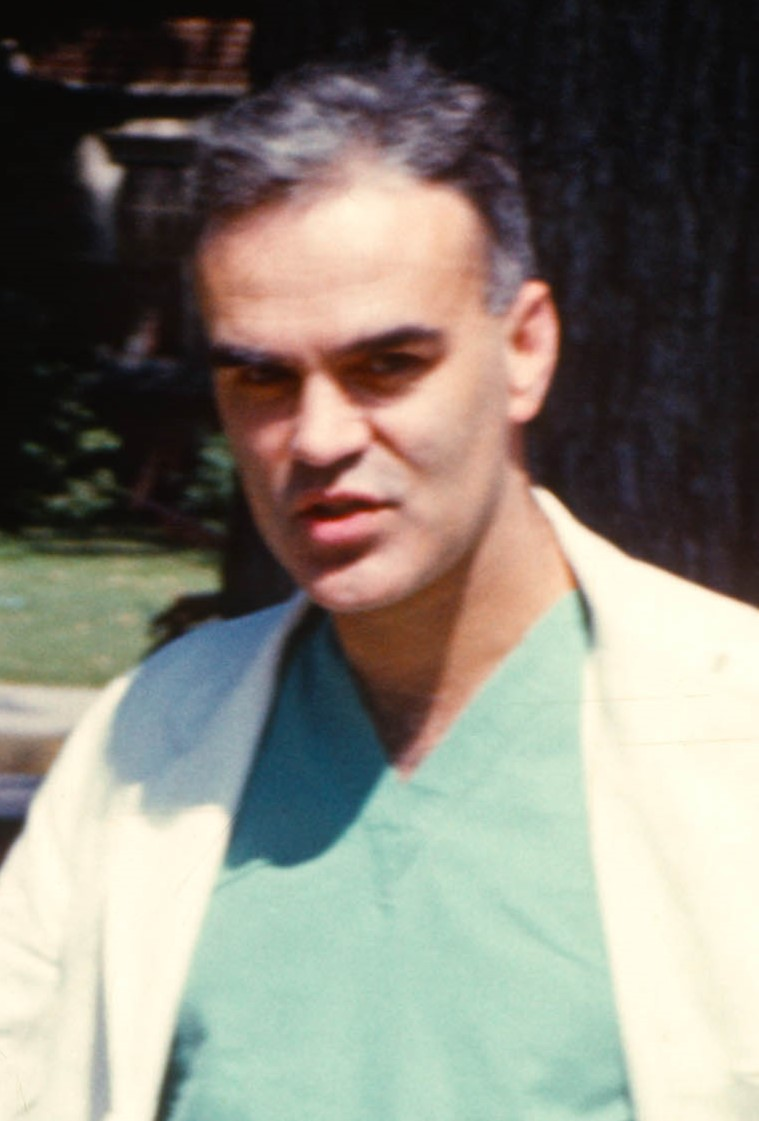
Dr. Adrian Flatt in 1961

Dr. Adrian Flatt began his collection in the late 1950s when he cast the hands of infants with congenital hand deformities in order to study them and plan his surgical procedures. He eventually cast the hands of 24 surgeons working at the medical center. He began casting hands of well-known individuals in 1962. His first celebrity hand casts were those of United States presidents Dwight D. Eisenhower and Harry S. Truman, and the collection grew to include the cast hands of over 120 individuals.

Dr. Flatt created the molds using the same type of resin used in the creation of dental composites. The hands were placed in a shoe box which he would fill with resin, although in the case of André the Giant he used much larger hat boxes. The collection has been on display at the Baylor University Medical Center since 1982, when Dr. Flatt began working there. The collection also includes historical hand casts of Abraham Lincoln, which were created in 1860.

== Reception ==
According to Dr. Jay Mabrey, the collection is the most popular site on the Baylor University campus. SFGate described the collection as "humaniz[ing] the people attached to the hands", stating that the exhibit invites viewers to contemplate what the hands have accomplished. The collection was described by the Dallas Observer as "the best place to look at a bunch of hands", and the Houston Chronicle called the collection "a must-see". The casts have been praised as "life-like and precise" by Atlas Obscura, which noted that the attention to detail showcases Dr. Flatt's "fascination with the unique size, shape, and signature of each mitt". The collection also featured in an episode of The Texas Bucket List, in which it was described as "hands down, quite a handful".

== See also ==
- Cynthia Plaster Caster
