= Take Another Little Piece of My Heart =

1993 non-fiction book by Pamela Des Barres

Take Another Little Piece of My Heart: A Groupie Grows Up is a non-fiction 1993 work by former groupie Pamela Des Barres. Continuing where I'm with the Band: Confessions of a Groupie left off, this book chronicles her life after being a groupie including the ups and downs of her turbulent marriage to actor/singer Michael Des Barres. Much of the book is about the couple's divorce in 1991 and the effects of the family dysfunction on their son, Nicholas Dean Des Barres.

It also includes brief tales of Pamela's friendships with other celebrities, including Frank Zappa, Sandra Bernhard, and Jaid Barrymore and some jokes called 'If you cried with the book read this and feel better' and 'Guide to a successful divorce'.

== Reception ==
Reviewing this book in The New York Times, Janet Maslin described the book as "a memoir, but it reads like a novel", "a chatty, entertaining account" of her life, written in "a funny and fearless conversational style." Publishers Weekly found the book somewhat less exciting than its predecessor, but called it "indisputably juicy, thanks to Des Barres's effervescence and no-holds-barred approach to celebrity gossip." Kirkus Reviews was less enthusiastic, describing the book as a "[g]ushing, not to say ecstatic, exercise in groupiespeak" that amounted to "[d]umbfoundingly overripe musk, but just right for the right ears."
