= Hollywood Stars (band) =

American rock band from Los Angeles

The Hollywood Stars
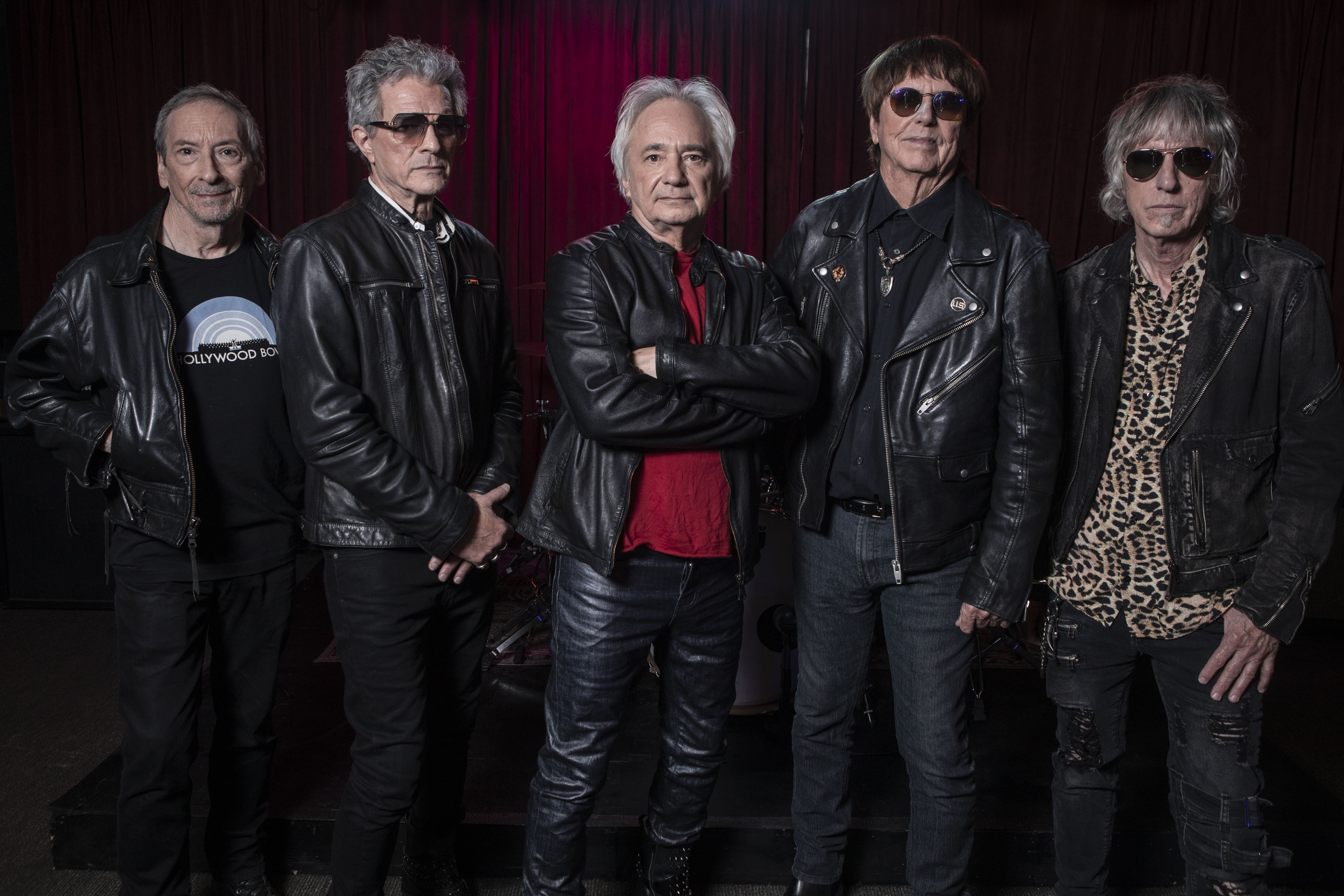
- The Hollywood Stars, 2024. left to right: Michael Rummans, Jeff Jourard, Scott Phares, Terry Rae, George Keller.

Background information
- Origin: Los Angeles, United States
- Genres: Rock, Pop, Glam rock, Power pop
- Years active: 1973–1974, 1975–1978, 2013, 2018–present
- Labels: Columbia, Arista, Last Summer Records, Burger Records, Blank Records, Golden Robot Records
- Members: Scott Phares; Terry Rae; Michael Rummans; George Keller; Jeff Jourard
- Past members: Mark Anthony; Ruben De Fuentes; Gary Van Dyke; Kevin Barnhill; Bobby Drier; Al Austin; Bryce Mobrae; Chezz Monroe; Nigel Taylor; John Schayer
- Website: The Hollywood Stars official website

The Hollywood Stars are an American rock band formed in Los Angeles, California in late 1973 by manager/impresario Kim Fowley. The band was created as a West Coast answer to the New York Dolls during the height of the popularity of the glam rock genre. The band signed with Columbia Records in 1974 and with Arista Records in 1976, releasing one self-titled LP with the latter label in 1977 and opening for The Kinks on their Sleepwalker tour the same year. The band's song "Escape" was recorded by Alice Cooper and released on the album Welcome to my Nightmare (1975), while their song "King of the Night Time World" was recorded by Kiss and released on the album Destroyer (1976). Two archive albums recorded in 1974 and 1976 were released in 2013 and 2019 to critical acclaim, prompting the band to reform in 2018.

While the band was active, they were regular performers at the Whisky a Go Go and the Starwood on West Hollywood's Sunset Strip. The group performed at the Hollywood Palladium in 1974 between sets by the New York Dolls and Iggy and the Stooges. Journey, The Runaways, Quiet Riot and Elliott Murphy opened for them, and they opened for the Ramones, Bo Diddley, the James Gang, Roy Buchanan, Brian Auger's Oblivion Express, Caravan, Sylvester and Fanny in addition to The Kinks. Angela Bowie and John Lennon attended their performances, and Iggy Pop performed as an on-stage guest with the band at the Whisky a Go Go. Members of the Hollywood Stars performed with Blue Cheer and Steppenwolf after the group disbanded.

== History ==
=== 1973–1974: Formation ===
The Hollywood Stars were the first "conceptual band" that Kim Fowley assembled, predating Fowley's groups The Runaways, Venus and the Razorblades, and The Orchids.

In the early 1970s, Fowley was a regular at Rodney Bingenheimer's English Disco, a Los Angeles-based club that specialized in British glam rock and occasionally featured live acts such as Iggy and the Stooges and Zolar X, the latter being Los Angeles' first glam rock band. During this period, he saw a need for a West Coast rock band that would fill the same void as the New York Dolls. Musician, songwriter and future Hollywood Stars member Mark Anthony was working as Fowley's chauffeur at the time. At one point, Anthony spoke to New York Dolls manager Marty Thau at a party, and asked him how the New York Dolls were formed. Thau stated that the members were "a bunch of broke street kids hanging around." Upon hearing this, Fowley decided to create a West Coast answer to the New York Dolls in a similar manner, taking the band name from the now-defunct minor league baseball team of the same name.

In November 1973, Fowley approached singer Scott Phares at Rodney Bingenheimer's English Disco about being the group's vocalist, having seen him perform a year prior at a swinger's ball with his previous band, the Boston-based group Adrian. He also approached drummer Terry Rae, who at the time was working with San Francisco-based rock band Flamin' Groovies. Rae had also worked with The Palace Guard, Strawberry Alarm Clock and the psych rock act Jamme, whose sole LP was produced by John Phillips (The Mamas & the Papas). Both musicians agreed to join the group. Terry Rae recommended guitarist Ruben De Fuentes, who had played in a band with Rae previously. De Fuentes was initially hesitant to join due to his preference for hard rock, but Fowley convinced him to join. They next added Gary Van Dyke on bass. Mark Anthony was added last due to Fowley's wish to give the group more of a Beatles-like sound.

Fowley rented a studio in the San Fernando Valley and put the band on a rigorous rehearsal schedule, using songs written by Mark Anthony and himself, as well as by songwriters Mars Bonfire and Peter Lion. The band played an invitation-only concert at Studio Instrument Rentals in Hollywood, which brought a crowd of 380 people, including representatives of the labels Liberty Records, A&M Records and Columbia Records. A&M and Columbia began bidding against each other to sign the band.

The Hollywood Stars played their first public show headlining the Whisky a Go Go on December 17, 1973. The club invited them back for a run of shows on December 26–31, opening for all-female rock band Fanny. Angela Bowie attended their December 28 appearance and John Lennon attended their December 29 appearance, both at Fowley's invitation. Angela Bowie spoke favorably of the band's song "Shine Like a Radio" (written by Fowley and Lion), calling the song a "#1 record."

On December 19, the Hollywood Stars went into the studio with Bob Ezrin producing. Ezrin worked with the band on arrangements for their song "Escape." Although Ezrin initially passed on working with the band further, he expressed interest in using two of the band's songs.

Fowley sent the Hollywood Stars to Boulder, Colorado in February 1974 in an effort to galvanize the band. There they opened for the James Gang and Roy Buchanan. On March 22, they opened for Brian Auger's Oblivion Express at Los Angeles' Embassy Concert Hall, and returned to the Whisky a Go Go on March 27 with Elliott Murphy opening.

=== 1974: Columbia Records period and first breakup ===
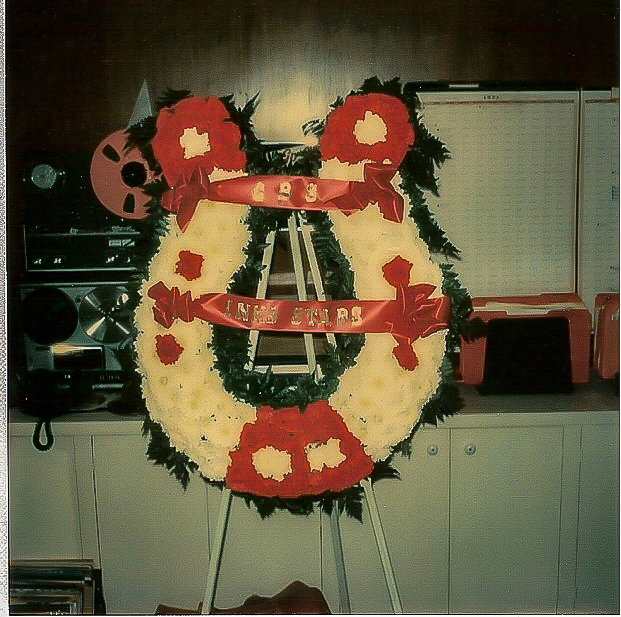
Columbia Records signs The Hollywood Stars, March 1974

Columbia Records signed The Hollywood Stars on March 28, 1974. By this time, Kevin Barnhill had replaced Gary Van Dyke on bass. Bill Szymczyk was brought in to produce the band's debut album, which was recorded at The Record Plant over the course of 34 days. Early in the recording process, Szymczyk abandoned the project, leaving the engineer to produce the album. Soon afterward, Columbia dismissed The Hollywood Stars' A&R representative in an internal staffing change, decided not to release the album and dropped the group from the label. A 1/4" tape containing a rough mix of the sessions survived.

The band headlined the Whisky a Go Go July 29–31 with Journey as opening act. On one occasion, Iggy Pop introduced the band to the audience, stating, "I didn't useta like the Hollywood Stars, I useta like the New York Dolls. Then I heard [The Hollywood Stars] play 'Satisfaction,' now I wanna [expletive] 'em." Pop also performed as an impromptu guest during the band's set. On August 24, the band played The Graffiti Jam at the Orange County Raceway in Irvine, California, supporting Bo Diddley.

On October 11, The Hollywood Stars performed at the Hollywood Street Revival and Trash Dance, a glam rock concert organized by Kim Fowley and held at the Hollywood Palladium. Writer Greg Shaw described the band's performance as "tight, flashy rock & roll, direct and satisfying." The Hollywood Stars' set was sandwiched between performances by Iggy and The Stooges and headliners the New York Dolls. Other performers included Michael Des Barres of the British glam rock act Silverhead, The GTOs, Peter Ivers, and Zolar X, with Kim Fowley announcing and Rodney Bingenheimer DJ'ing between sets.

Despite the band's local popularity, internal tensions and industry stigma from the failure of the Columbia Records deal led to the decision to break up the band. The group played the Whisky a Go Go November 5–6 opening for Caravan, and then played their final performance at the Whisky a Go Go on November 10. This final show received a highly favorable review from writer Lisa Fancher, who would go on to found the punk rock label Frontier Records.

Just before the band's breakup, Fowley went back to Bob Ezrin and offered him the songs "Escape" and "King of the Night Time World." Ezrin took "Escape" to Alice Cooper. Cooper made changes to the lyrics and included the song on Welcome to My Nightmare (1975). Similarly, Ezrin took "King of the Night Time World" to Kiss, who altered the lyrics slightly and recorded the song for the album Destroyer (1976). Bachman–Turner Overdrive's non-LP Single "Down to the Line" (1975) lifted the melody and riff from "Escape," prompting a lawsuit from Mark Anthony and Kim Fowley that was settled out of court.

After the breakup of the Hollywood Stars, Terry Rae and Ruben De Fuentes joined Blue Cheer, who had reformed earlier in 1974. In 1974, Blue Cheer worked with Kim Fowley on an album project that was ultimately abandoned. Sessions from the period ended up on the Captain Trip Records album Unreleased '69/'74 (1995). Scott Phares joined the band Hero, who released the albums Hero (1977) with Mercury Records and Boys Will be Boys (1978) with 20th Century Fox Records. Both albums were produced by Michael Lloyd.

=== 1975–1978: Reformation and Arista Records period ===
Alice Cooper's Welcome to My Nightmare LP was released in March 1975, debuting at No. 63 on the Billboard 200 chart on March 23 and working its way up to No. 5 on June 21. The inclusion of "Escape" on the album encouraged The Hollywood Stars to reform. The new lineup featured original members Mark Anthony (lead vocals and rhythm guitar), Reuben De Fuentes (lead guitar) and Terry Rae (drums), along with new members Michael Rummans (bass, previously with The Sloths) and second drummer Bobby Drier. Dubbed "The Stars," the band played the Whisky a Go Go September 28–29 with The Runaways opening, followed by the Starwood October 20–21 as opening act for disco singer Sylvester.

In February 1976, Phonograph Record magazine reported on Los Angeles' then-emerging rock scene, describing what would later be considered proto-punk. The Stars were listed among the best of the upcoming groups, alongside Iggy Pop, The Runaways and The New Order (the latter featuring Ron Asheton of The Stooges and Dennis Thompson of the MC5). The article reported that the Stars "are currently at work on a demo."

In 1976, the band recorded a full-length album at Sound City Studios in Van Nuys with Neil Merryweather producing. The album was intended to be a finished project that could attract interest from major record companies. The band then signed a record deal with Clive Davis' Arista Records. Upon signing the band, Davis demanded that the band rerecord their album. These sessions would yield their debut album, The Hollywood Stars (1977). The Hollywood Stars was recorded at Cherokee Studios in Los Angeles with Harry Maslin producing. The album features appearances by studio musicians Nicky Hopkins (The Rolling Stones) and Oliver C. Brown (KC and the Sunshine Band).

The Hollywood Stars opened for the Ramones at La Paloma Theatre in Encinitas, California on March 10, 1977 and at The Backdoor, a venue located on the San Diego State University campus, on March 12. This was followed in April by a run of appearances on the West Coast and in Canada supporting The Kinks on their Sleepwalker tour. Arista released The Kinks' song "Sleepwalker" to radio as a yellow vinyl split single, with the Hollywood Stars' lead single "All the Kids on the Street" as its flip side. The Hollywood Stars played the Starwood July 5–6 with Quiet Riot opening.

Disagreements regarding the direction the band should take led to the dissolution of The Hollywood Stars in late 1977, with Mark Anthony opting to start a solo career. The band reformed in 1978 and played locally in Los Angeles with a new lineup featuring De Fuentes, Rummans, Drier, Al Austin (vocals) and Bryce Mobrae (guitar). After this lineup disbanded, Ruben De Fuentes joined Nick St. Nicholas' lineup of Steppenwolf in 1979–1980.

=== 2013: Shine Like a Radio release ===
In 2013, producer and musician Robin Wills (The Barracudas) connected with Hollywood Stars drummer Terry Rae via a UK power pop blog run by Wills. Upon learning that former vocalist Scott Phares possessed a 1/4" tape of the band's 1974 Columbia Records sessions, Wills booked studio time to clean up the tapes and released the album on his own label, Last Summer Records, with distribution from Light in the Attic Records. The album was released on vinyl LP in a limited edition of 1000 units. Record Collector magazine reviewed the album favorably, calling it "one of the most vital reissues of the year."

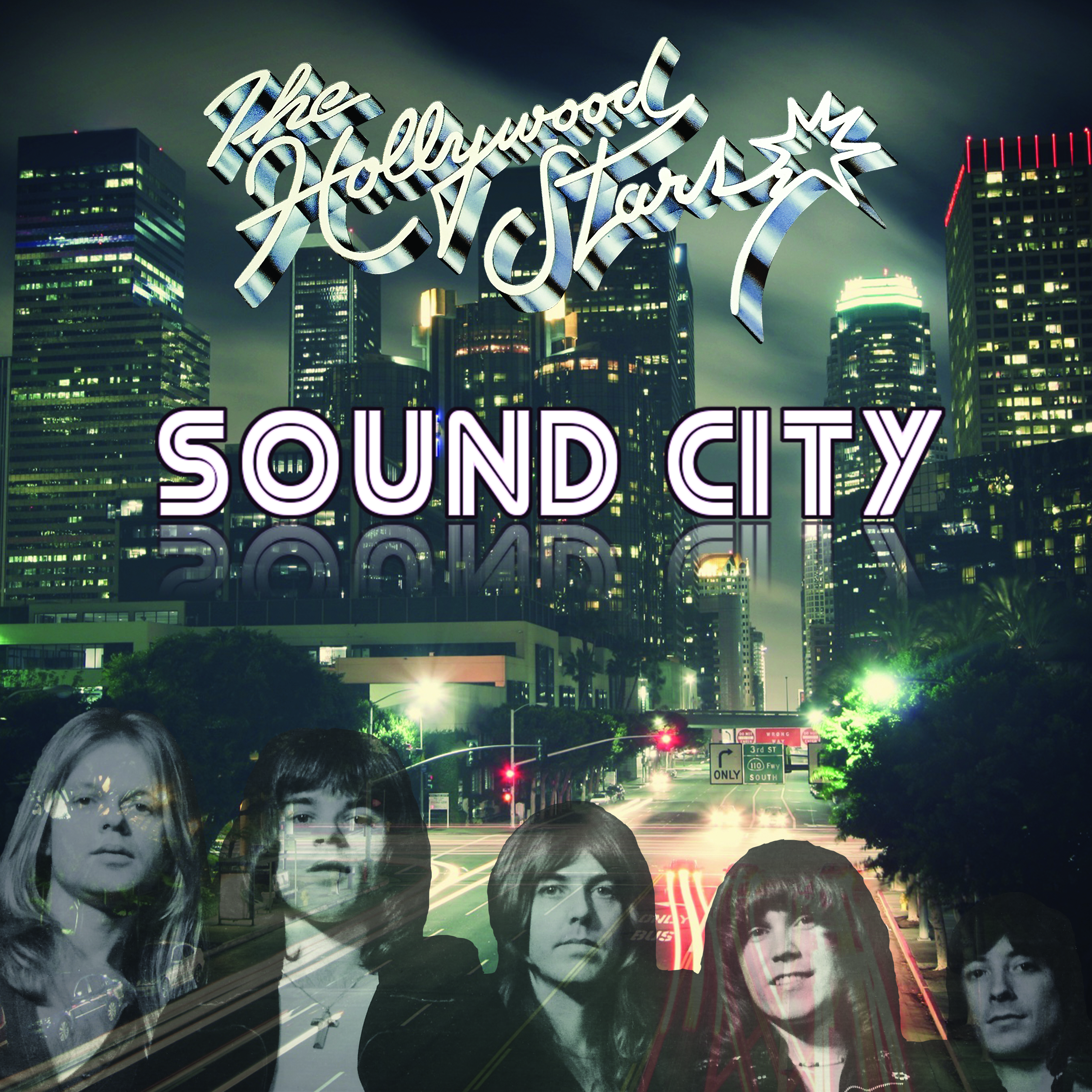
Sound City (2019) album cover

Soon after, Scott Phares' son wrote and directed a video for "King of the Night Time World" featuring original members of the band. Although the band discussed performing live, Phares was initially unable to rehearse with the band due to being located on the East Coast while the remaining members lived in Los Angeles.

=== 2018–present: Reformation and further releases ===
In the summer of 2018, original members Phares, Rae, De Fuentes and Rummans met at the Rainbow Bar and Grill to discuss the future of the band. It was agreed that the band would rehearse in Los Angeles, and Phares would rehearse with them when he was in town and fill in by rehearsing to tapes. The band added Chezz Monroe as second guitarist and played their first show at The Bootleg Theatre November 18.

The band signed to Burger Records in 2019. The label released Sound City, the original 1976 demo album produced by Neil Merryweather, on August 23. Shindig! rated Sound City 4 out of 5 stars and complimented the album's "raunchy rockers and crowd-pleasing anthems," while AllMusic rated the album 3 1/2 out of 5 stars and referred to the album as "top-notch power pop."

The band performed at the Whisky a Go Go on July 18, 2019, and recorded the show. Initially planning to release the Whisky a Go Go recording as a live album with Burger Records, the band ended their affiliation with the label upon learning of the scandal surrounding the label. The band signed with Golden Robot Records in mid-2020, who then released the Whisky a Go Go recording as Live at the Sunset Strip on October 29, 2021. They followed this in March 2023 with an EP of new material entitled Still Around.

In 2023, the band announced the addition of guitarists George Keller in April and Jeff Jourard, the latter formerly of The Motels, in June. The two guitarists replaced departing members Chezz Monroe and Ruben De Fuentes. The band played The Redwood Bar and Grill on June 21, and the show was reviewed favorably by the LA Weekly.

In June of 2024, the band released their first studio album of new material in 47 years, Starstruck. Shindig! magazine gave the album a 5-star review calling it "...the best powerpop album of the year to date." Musoscribe declared, "Thirteen songs (plus a couple of alt versions) are all killer and no filler."

== Band members ==
Member	Years active	Role
Mark Anthony	1973–1977	Vocals, rhythm guitar, songwriter
Ruben De Fuentes	1973–1978, 2013, 2018–2023	Lead guitar, songwriter
Terry Rae	1973–1977, 2013, 2018–present	Drums, vocals, songwriter
Scott Phares	1973–1974, 2013, 2018–present	Lead vocals, songwriter
Gary Van Dyke	1973–1974, 2013	Bass
Kevin Barnhill	1974	Bass
Michael Rummans	1975–1978, 2018–2019, 2023–present	Bass, vocals
Bobby Drier	1975–1978	Drums
Al Austin	1978	Vocals
Bryce Mobrae	1978	Bass
Chezz Monroe	2018–2023	Rhythm guitar, vocals, songwriter
Nigel Taylor	2019-2020	Bass, vocals
John Schayer	2021–2022	Bass, vocals
George Keller	2023–present	Lead guitar
Jeff Jourard	2023–present	Rhythm guitar

== Discography ==
Format	Title	Label	Year recorded	Year released
LP, Cassette, 8-track	The Hollywood Stars	Arista	1976	1977
7" Single	"All The Kids on the Street" b/w "All For Love"	Arista	1976	1977
7" Single (Yellow vinyl, promo)	The Kinks "Sleepwalker" b/w The Hollywood Stars "All The Kids on the Street"	Arista	1976	1977
7" Single	"Stay The Way You Are" b/w "All For Love"	Arista	1976	1977
LP	Shine Like A Radio: The Great Lost Album Of 1974	Last Summer	1974	2013
7" EP	King of the Night Time World	Blank Records	1974, 1976	2017
CD, LP	Sound City	Burger Records	1976	2019
CD	Live on the Sunset Strip: July 18, 2019	Golden Robot Records	2019	2021
EP (Digital)	Still Around	Golden Robot Records	2022	2023
CD	Starstruck	RumBar	2023	2024
LP	Starstruck	Sioux	2023	2024
CD	Hey!LA!	Sioux	2026	2026
