= Baylor University Medical Center =

Hospital in Dallas, Texas

- Baylor Scott & White Health

Geography
- Location: 3500 Gaston Avenue, Dallas, Texas, Dallas County, Texas, United States
- Coordinates: 32.7903°N 96.7809°W

Organization
- Affiliated university: Texas A&M College of Medicine

Services
- Emergency department: Level I trauma center
- Beds: 1200

History
- Founded: 1903

Links
- Website: www.bswhealth.com/locations/hospital/dallas
- Lists: Hospitals in Texas

Baylor University Medical Center (Baylor Dallas or BUMC), part of Baylor Scott & White Health, is a not-for-profit hospital in Dallas, Texas. It has 1,200 licensed beds and is one of the major centers for patient care, medical training and research in North Texas.

In 2013, Scott & White merged with Baylor Health Care System to form Baylor Scott & White Health. The medical center is affiliated with the Texas A&M Health Science Center College of Medicine.

== History ==
In 1903, the hospital opened as Texas Baptist Memorial Sanitarium in a 14-room renovated house with 25 beds. It received its charter from the state government in October 1903 and had financial support from the Baptist General Convention of Texas. The nursing school was established in 1918. The hospital was renamed Baylor Hospital in 1921 and then Baylor University Hospital in 1936 to emphasize its relationship with the Baptist-affiliated Baylor University in Waco, Texas. The Baylor College of Medicine, College of Dentistry, and School of Pharmacy were co-located with the hospital. The Florence Nightingale Maternity Hospital opened in 1937 on the same grounds. Financial difficulties due to the ongoing World War II forced the College of Medicine to move to Houston. The hospital faced an uncertain future since it no longer had the support of an affiliated medical school and its buildings were in need of renovation. Some of the physicians at the hospital who were also professors at the College of Medicine chose to stay with the hospital instead of moving to Houston.

The 1950s signaled a milestone in the development of the hospital. With the construction of the seven-story, 436-bed George W. Truett Memorial Hospital in 1950, Baylor became the fifth-largest general hospital in the country. In 1959, Florence Nightingale Maternity Hospital was replaced with a newly expanded Women's and Children's Hospital, later renamed Karl and Esther Hoblitzelle Memorial Hospital. At this point, "medical center" was accordingly added to the hospital name.

Baylor Health Care System was formally established in 1981 with Baylor University Medical Center at Dallas as its flagship hospital and corporate headquarters.

Since 1982, the Baylor University Medical Center has displayed the Adrian Flatt hand collection, which, according to Dr. Jay Mabrey, is the most popular site on the Baylor University campus.
