= The GTOs =

American pop band (1968–1970)

- The GTOs in 1969. Left to right: Miss Christine, Miss Cynderella, Miss Sandra, Miss Mercy, and Miss Pamela.

Background information
- Origin: Los Angeles, California, United States
- Genres: Psychedelic pop; spoken word
- Years active: 1968–1970 (one off reunion: 1974)
- Labels: Straight; Reprise
- Past members: Miss Pamela; Miss Mercy; Miss Cynderella; Miss Christine; Miss Lucy; Miss Sandra; Miss Sparky

The GTOs (Girls Together Outrageously) were an all-girl group from the Los Angeles area, specifically the Sunset Strip scene. The group was active for two and a half years (1968–1970), followed by one reunion performance in 1974. Their only album, Permanent Damage, was produced by Frank Zappa and released in 1969. The group has been described as associated with the Los Angeles freak scene.

== Personnel ==
- Miss Pamela, born Pamela Ann Miller (later Pamela Des Barres) on September 9, 1948, in Reseda, California, is the most commercially successful of the GTOs.
- Miss Mercy, a.k.a. Mercy Fontenot, was born Judith Edra Peters in Burbank, California on February 15 or 16, 1949. After the breakup of the GTOs in 1971, Fontenot married the guitarist Shuggie Otis. They divorced, and their son Lucky Otis (also a musician) was raised by his grandparents, the R&B musician Johnny Otis and his wife Phyllis. Miss Mercy died on July 27, 2020.
- Miss Cynderella (also spelled Miss Cinderella) was born Cynthia Sue Wells (later Cynthia Cale-Binion) on January 26, 1952, in Los Angeles, California. Wells married John Cale of The Velvet Underground in 1971, but the marriage was rocky, and they divorced in 1975. Cale's song "Guts" opens with the line "The bugger in the short sleeves fucked my wife" (referring to Kevin Ayers' sleeping with Wells in 1974).
- Miss Christine (sometimes known as Miss Crispy), born Christine Ann Frka on November 27, 1949, in San Pedro, California, was the first babysitter for Moon Unit Zappa, Frank Zappa's first daughter. She is shown on the front cover of Frank Zappa's 1969 album Hot Rats emerging from an empty swimming pool on Errol Flynn's former estate in the Hollywood Hills. She dated rock musician Alice Cooper and is credited with creating his stage persona. Frka also dated Todd Rundgren and Russell Mael; Frka died on November 6, 1972, of a barbiturate overdose in a house in Cohasset, Massachusetts, which at the time was being rented by Jonathan Richman and The Modern Lovers. She overdosed shortly before her 23rd birthday.
- Miss Lucy was born Luz Selenia Offerrall in Puerto Rico. After moving to Los Angeles, she met two of her future bandmates, Miss Pamela and Miss Sparky, at the house belonging to Vito Paulekas. Miss Lucy was not an original member of The GTOs; she joined the group after the recording of Permanent Damage. She later left the group, claiming they were becoming too commercial. She was married to the late Gordon McLaren (bassist for a New York City band The Groupies) from 1975 to 1981. As an actress, Miss Lucy appeared in 200 Motels (1971), Video from Hell (1985), and Uncle Meat (1987). She died in 1991 of complications from AIDS.
- Miss Sandra was born Sandra Lynn Rowe (later Sandra Leano and Sandra Lynn Harris) on January 18, 1949, in San Pedro, Los Angeles. She was in the group only a short while before becoming pregnant by Cal Schenkel, Frank Zappa's official artist-in-residence. In publicity photos for the band, she is shown late in her pregnancy, with a big star painted on her stomach. She moved back to San Pedro with her infant daughter, Raven, and, after the GTOs broke up, married Bradley Harris. They had three children together. Sandra died of cancer in Albion, California, on April 23, 1991, at age 42.
- Miss Sparky was born Linda Sue Parker in 1948 and was renowned for driving a Hudson Hornet in the late 1960s on the Sunset Strip. She and Pamela Des Barres attended Cleveland High School together. She recorded a vocal track on the song "Disco Boy" on Frank Zappa's album Zoot Allures (1976) and was once employed by Universal Studios and Disney's Hollywood Studios. After leaving The GTOs she moved to New York and married an actor.

== History ==
Pamela Miller and Linda Parker met around 1966 while attending Cleveland High School in Los Angeles. Christine Frka traveled to Los Angeles from San Pedro with Sandra Rowe, and both lived in the basement of Frank Zappa's Log Cabin at 2401 Laurel Canyon Boulevard in the Hollywood Hills in 1968. Frka was the live-in nanny for Zappa's eldest child Moon Unit before Miller took over the following year. Judith Peters had emigrated from the Haight Ashbury to Los Angeles due to "boredom", alleging she "couldn't be a hippie forever." Cynthia Wells was brought into the group by Peters after the nucleus of the group had been formed. This accounts for Miss Cynderella's presence in some, but not all, of the GTOs' publicity shots. Lucy Offerall also was not an original member but joined after the recording of Permanent Damage.

The group initially called themselves the Cherry Sisters but soon changed to the Laurel Canyon Ballet Company. Frank Zappa later changed their name to the GTOs, which he described as "an acronym which, as Stanley Booth wrote, could mean Girls Together Outrageously, Orally, or anything else starting with O." On their album's inner sleeve, the acronym is also defined as "Girls Together Occasionally", "Girls Together Often", and "Girls Together Only". Miss Lucy stated in an interview that the latter name is what it stood for, though it is understood by most that the name on the album, Girls Together Outrageously, is the name of the group.

The members were connected by their association with Zappa, who encouraged their artistic endeavors despite their limited vocal skills. The group performed live "only 4 or 5 times", although they created a strong impression at their December 1968 performance at the Shrine Auditorium opening for The Mothers of Invention, Alice Cooper and Wild Man Fischer. A mix of theatrics, singing, dancing, wild costumes, and unusual lyrical content were staples of their act. Their only album, Permanent Damage (Straight Records), was produced in 1969 by Zappa with the assistance of Lowell George and Russ Titelman on tracks 7 and 11. The latter track also features Titelman's brother-in-law, guitarist Ry Cooder, and both Cooder and Titelman appear on Captain Beefheart's Safe as Milk album. Track 5 "The Captain's Fat Theresa Shoes" is a GTO comment on Beefheart's taste in footwear (his cousin Victor Hayden had introduced him to Pamela Des Barres). The songs are mixed with conversations among the members of the group, friends, and others, including Cynthia Plaster Caster and Rodney Bingenheimer. The album features songwriting contributions from Lowell George, Jeff Beck, Craig Doerge, and Davy Jones. A young Rod Stewart is featured on track 14. Permanent Damage was re-issued on CD in 1989 by Enigma Retro.

The initial sessions leading to the performance and album were coached and rehearsed by Pauline Butcher, who lived in the 'log cabin' rented by the Zappas in the late 1960s and that had been owned by silent film star Tom Mix. She met Zappa in London when he needed a typist/secretary to type out the lyrics to "Absolutely Free". They hit it off and he offered her a job as his secretary.

The GTOs performed a one-off reunion show on October 11, 1974 at the Hollywood Street Revival and Trash Dance, a glam rock concert organized by Kim Fowley and held at the Hollywood Palladium in Los Angeles. The lineup featured Miss Pamela, Miss Sparky, and Mackenzie Phillips (who played Carol Morrison in American Graffiti and was a regular in the Los Angeles glam rock scene). The trio sang the song "Mr. Sandman," and then stayed on stage to perform as backing vocalists for Michael Des Barres (formerly of Silverhead), who performed immediately afterward. Miss Mercy and Miss Cynderella showed up unannounced the day of the show and were onstage with the other members, but were not involved in the rehearsals. Other performers included headliners the New York Dolls, the Hollywood Stars, Iggy and the Stooges (with Ray Manzarek of The Doors in the band), Peter Ivers, and Zolar X, with Kim Fowley announcing and Rodney Bingenheimer DJ'ing between sets.

The group is referenced in the 2022 song "Eddie", by the Red Hot Chili Peppers. ("Cut my teeth down at the Whisky, GTOs tried to kiss me").

== Influence ==
Rowan Miles of English pop duo the Femcels formed in 2024 and cited the GTOs as an influence.

== Discography ==
- Permanent Damage (Straight Records, 1969)

=== Other releases ===
Four tracks from Permanent Damage also were released on Warner/Reprise Loss Leaders compilation albums:

- "Do Me in Once and I'll Be Sad, Do Me in Twice and I'll Know Better (Circular Circulation)" – on Zappéd (1969);
- "Kansas and the BTOs"; "The Captain's Fat Theresa Shoes"; and "The Original GTOs" – on The Big Ball (1970).

== See also ==
- Pennie Lane Trumbull
