= Permanent Damage (The GTOs album) =

Studio album by the GTOs
- Released: 1969
- Recorded: 1969
- Genre: Experimental rock; psychedelic rock; spoken word
- Length: 31:39
- Label: Straight; Reprise
- Producer: Frank Zappa; Russ Titelman; Lowell George

Professional ratings
Review scores
Source	Rating
AllMusic	4.5/5 stars

Permanent Damage is the only studio album by the GTOs. The album was released in 1969 on Straight Records.

== Track listing ==
All tracks composed by Davy Jones (not to be confused with Davy Jones from The Monkees) and Miss Sparky; lyrics by GTOs (Girls Together Outrageously); except where indicated

No.	Title	Writer(s)	Length
1.	"The Eureka Springs Garbage Lady"	Craig Doerge, Cynthia Sue Wells, Nick St. Nicholas	3:47
2.	"Miss Pamela and Miss Sparky discuss stuffed bras and some of their early gym class experiences"		2:10
3.	"Who's Jim Sox?"		0:18
4.	"Kansas and the BTO's"		1:12
5.	"The Captain's Fat Theresa Shoes"	Christine Frka, Cynthia Sue Wells, Pamela Ann Miller, Sandra Lynn Rowe, Davy Jones, Sparkie Parker	1:56
6.	"Wouldn't It Be Sad if There Were No Cones?"		1:11
7.	"Do Me in Once and I'll Be Sad, Do Me in Twice and I'll Know Better (Circular Circulation)"		2:19
8.	"The Moche Monster Review"		1:46
9.	"TV Lives"	Christine Frka, Don Preston	1:03
10.	"Rodney"		3:42
11.	"I Have a Paintbrush in My Hand to Color a Triangle (Mercy's Tune)"	Judith Edra Peters, Lowell George	2:11
12.	"Miss Christine's First Conversation With the Plaster Casters of Chicago"		0:57
13.	"The Original GTOs"		1:05
14.	"The Ghost Chained to the Past, Present, and Future (Shock Treatment)"	Cynthia Sue Wells, Judith Edra Peters	1:45
15.	"Love on an Eleven Year Old Level"		1:18
16.	"Miss Pamela's First Conversation With the Plaster Casters of Chicago"		1:31
17.	"I'm in Love with the Ooo-Ooo Man"	Davy Jones, Pamela Ann Miller	3:27

== Personnel ==
The GTOs

- Miss Christine - vocals
- Miss Mercy - vocals
- Miss Cinderella - vocals
- Miss Pamela - vocals
- Miss Sandra - vocals
- Miss Sparky - vocals (she left before the album was released and, according to Miss Pamela, "... Frank had to delete her from the album cover."

Musicians

- Jeff Beck, Lowell George, Ry Cooder - guitar
- Roy Estrada - bass guitar
- Craig Doerge, Ian Underwood, Nicky Hopkins - keyboards
- Don Preston - synthesizer
- Jimmy Carl Black - drums
- Frank Zappa - tambourine
- Rod Stewart - vocals on "The Ghost Chained to the Past, Present, and Future (Shock Treatment)"
- Cynthia Albritton - voice on telephone connection on "Miss Christine's First Conversation With the Plaster Casters of Chicago"
