= Big Name Fan =

Member of a fandom who is particularly well-known

Among science fiction and fantasy, comic book, and media fans, a Big Name Fan (BNF) is a member of a fandom who is particularly well-known and celebrated for their writings in fanzines, semi-professional magazines and (more recently) blogs; or for other contributions such as art and (in some communities) fanfiction. Some BNFs have also contributed to the franchise itself (Doctor Who is noted for being primarily written and produced by people who were BNFs of the series before it was brought back in 2005). They may have fans of their own, who praise them and seek out their work.

BNFs may have their autographs requested at conventions; they are often invited as Guests of Honor at conventions, and in some fandoms may be paid to speak as guests at commercial shows which pay for appearances. The term originated in science fiction fandom, and dates to 1955 or earlier. It was recorded in 1955, in Bob Tucker's The Neo-Fan Guide; other early references include 1959's Fancyclopedia II and Donald Franson's 1962 work A Key to the Terminology of Science-Fiction Fandom. In its original sense, 'BNF' referred to "one well known within the world of science-fiction fandom".

== Discontinued Hugo Award ==
When the Hugo Awards were instituted in 1953, one of the categories was "#1 Fan Personality", which has also been referred to as the "BNF Award." This award, which was not revived when the Hugos became institutionalized in 1955, was given to Forrest J Ackerman. (According to an interim report issued by the Philcon II convention committee while voting was still going on, the next most popular candidate at the time was Harlan Ellison; but at the time Ackerman was given the award, he actually physically declined it in favor of Ken Slater, to whom the trophy was later forwarded.)

== Connotations and usage ==
Fans report ambivalent feelings towards BNFs. The title BNF also carries a negative connotation of being arrogant and self-important. Accordingly, many people who are deemed BNFs resist being tagged with that designation.
