= Pamela Des Barres =

American rock and roll groupie, writer, musician, and actress

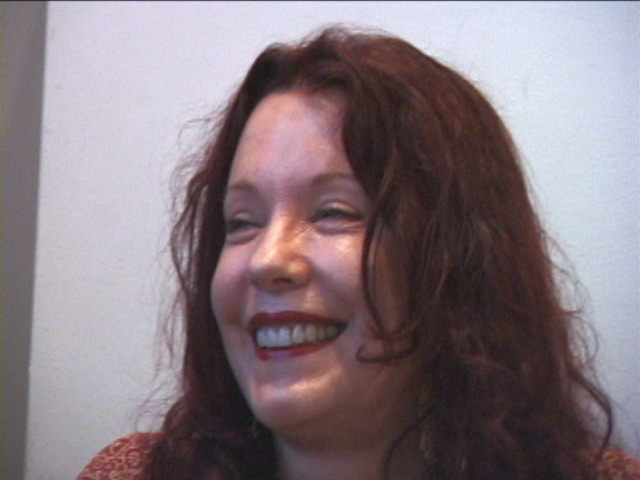
- Pamela Des Barres, July 2007
- Born: Pamela Ann Miller; September 9, 1948 (age 77); Los Angeles, California, U.S.
- Other name: Miss Pamela
- Occupations: Rock and roll groupie; author
- Spouse: Michael Des Barres (m. 1977; div. 1991)
- Children: 1

Pamela Des Barres (day-BAR; born Pamela Ann Miller; September 9, 1948) is an American rock and roll groupie, writer, musician, and actress. She is best known for her 1987 memoir, I'm with the Band: Confessions of a Groupie, which details her experiences in the Los Angeles rock music scene of the 1960s and 1970s. She is also a former member of the experimental Frank Zappa-produced music group the GTOs.

== Early life ==
Des Barres' parents were from Kentucky. Just before she was born, her father moved the family to the Los Angeles, California area, where Des Barres resides to this day. Her mother was a homemaker; her father worked for Anheuser-Busch and was occasionally a gold miner. Des Barres idolized Elvis Presley as a child and the Beatles as a teenager, and she fantasized about meeting and dating her favorite Beatle, Paul McCartney. Later, upon discovering the Rolling Stones, she daydreamed of Mick Jagger.

== Rock music groupie ==
A high school acquaintance, Victor Hayden, introduced Des Barres to his cousin Don Van Vliet, better known as Captain Beefheart, a musician and friend of Frank Zappa. Van Vliet, in turn, introduced her to Charlie Watts and Bill Wyman of the Rolling Stones, which drew her to the rock music scene on the Sunset Strip in Los Angeles. She started to spend her time with the Byrds and other bands, and when she graduated from high school in 1966, she took various jobs that would allow her to live near the Sunset Strip and take part in the rock music scene. She famously went on to form friendships with many of the great musical artists of that era, and became romantically linked with various notable artists such as Mick Jagger, Jimmy Page, Keith Moon, Noel Redding, Chris Hillman, Gram Parsons, Brandon deWilde, and Don Johnson.

== Music career ==
Des Barres was also a member of the GTOs, an all-female music and performance art group sponsored by Frank Zappa. The GTOs had only one performance under that name along with the Mothers of Invention, Alice Cooper, Wild Man Fischer and Easy Chair at the Shrine Auditorium in Los Angeles, on December 6–7, 1968. The entire concert lasted for six hours. The group dissolved just a month after the release of their first and only album, Permanent Damage, due to some of its other members being arrested and detained for drug possession.

== Acting career ==
During the 1970s, Des Barres pursued a career as an actress, appearing in movies (including Zappa's 200 Motels), doing commercials, and playing a recurring role on the soap opera Search for Tomorrow throughout 1974. She continued to work as a nanny/babysitter for Zappa, who urged her to continue writing the diary she had begun in high school, in which she had faithfully recorded the important details of her life. When her acting career stalled, she continued to work for the Zappa family as a nanny for Zappa's children, Dweezil and Moon Unit.

== Family life ==
On October 29, 1977, she married Michael Des Barres, who had been lead singer first with Silverhead (signed in 1972 to Deep Purple's record label Purple Records) and later for Detective (signed to Led Zeppelin's Swan Song Records label), and who, in 1985, was tour vocalist for the Power Station. They have a son, Nicholas Dean Des Barres (GameFan magazine's Nick Rox). The couple divorced in the summer of 1991.

== Memoirs and other endeavors ==
Des Barres wrote two memoirs about her experience as a groupie, I'm with the Band: Confessions of a Groupie (1987) and Take Another Little Piece of My Heart: A Groupie Grows Up (1993). It is widely believed that Cameron Crowe drew from these memoirs to create the groupie character Penny Lane for his film Almost Famous. Crowe has stated that the character was actually a composite of various women he knew during his time as a teenage rock journalist, including one named Pennie Trumbull who went by Pennie Lane. The memoirs by Des Barres have another connection to the film: actress Kate Hudson read them for inspiration as she portrayed Penny Lane.

The March 1989 issue of Playboy magazine featured Des Barres in a nude layout, published together with an article the author herself wrote for the magazine. In the captions, she was quoted as saying, "I wanted to be in Playboy when I was younger, but my breasts did not precede me. But now I have semicelebrity tits, so they don't have to be as big."

In addition to her memoirs, Des Barres has written three non-fiction books: Rock Bottom: Dark Moments in Music Babylon (1996); Let's Spend the Night Together: Backstage Secrets of Rock Muses and Supergroupies (2007); and Let It Bleed: How to Write a Rockin' Memoir (2017). An updated edition of I'm with the Band was released in 2005.

Today, Pamela Des Barres continues to author books, contribute to others' works as an editor and consultant, and pen articles for online and print publications. She writes a regular column for Please Kill Me, in which she confessed that she once kissed murderer and former Manson Family member Bobby Beausoleil in Golden Gate Park during his pre-Manson days. In addition to her work as a writer, Des Barres also teaches creative writing classes in Los Angeles, as well as in several other cities throughout the U.S. and internationally. She affectionately refers to her writing class members as her "dolls".

== Discography ==
- 1969 The GTOs - Permanent Damage (Bizarre/Straight)

== Bibliography ==
- 1987 I'm with the Band: Confessions of a Groupie
- 1992 Take Another Little Piece of My Heart: A Groupie Grows Up
- 1996 Rock Bottom: Dark Moments in Music Babylon
- 2007 Let's Spend the Night Together: Backstage Secrets of Rock Muses and Supergroupies
- 2012 One Night Bands
- 2017 Let It Bleed: How to Write a Rockin' Memoir

== Filmography ==
- 1971 200 Motels
- 1973 Slaughter's Big Rip-Off
- 1974 Arizona Slim
- 1975 Kitty Can't Help It
- 1978 Paradise Alley
- 1978 Human Feelings
- 2003 Mayor of the Sunset Strip
- 2015 Michael Des Barres: Who Do You Want Me to Be?

== Television ==
- 1974-5 Search for Tomorrow
- 2011 The Young and the Restless
