= Cynthia Plaster Caster =

American artist (1947–2022)

- Cynthia Plaster Caster in 2002, holding a cast of Jimi Hendrix's penis.
- Born: Cynthia Dorothy Albritton; May 24, 1947; Chicago, Illinois, U.S.
- Died: April 21, 2022 (aged 74); Chicago, Illinois, U.S.
- Education: University of Illinois Chicago
- Known for: Sculpting

Cynthia Dorothy Albritton (May 24, 1947 – April 21, 2022), better known by the pseudonym Cynthia Plaster Caster, was an American visual artist and self-described "recovering groupie" who gained fame for creating plaster casts of celebrities' erect penises. Albritton began her career in 1968 by casting penises of rock musicians. She later expanded her subjects to include filmmakers and other types of artists, eventually amassing a collection of over 70 plaster penises. In 2000, she began casting female artists' breasts.

== Biography ==
Albritton was born in Chicago. In the late 1960s, she became active in the free love and rock music subcultures. Albritton studied at the University of Illinois Chicago. In college, when her art teacher gave the class an assignment to "plaster cast something solid", she had the idea to create a lifecast of an erect penis, which would then become flaccid and exit the mold. She created molds using alginate. She stated that her hobby of casting penises began as a "shtick to get laid" but she soon began to enjoy the aspect of collecting, and she began to see it as art. She had cast a few non-celebrities before casting Jimi Hendrix as her first celebrity cast.

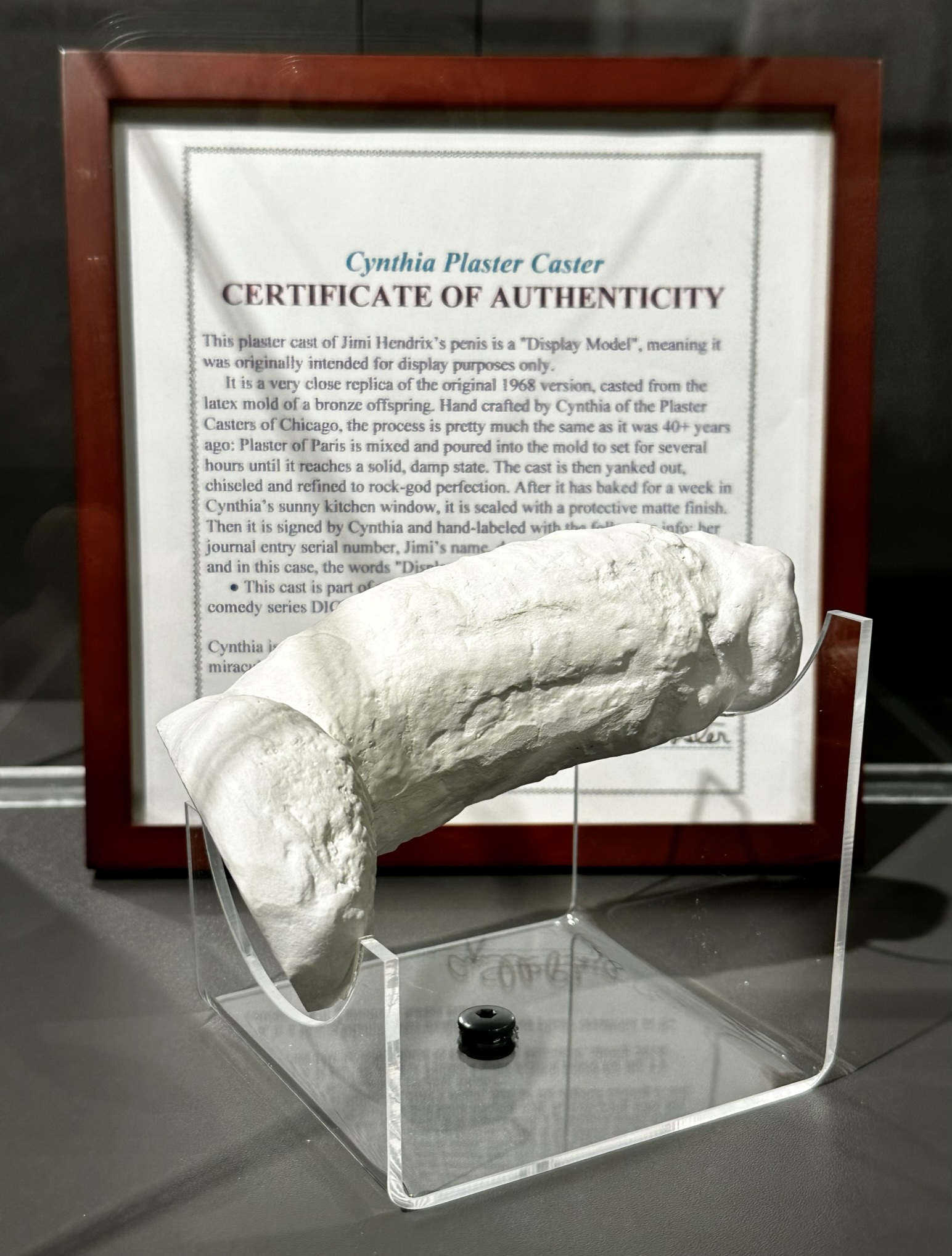
Albritton's plaster cast of Jimi Hendrix's penis on display at the Icelandic Phallological Museum.

Frank Zappa found the concept of her casts both humorous and creative, though he had no interest in having his own penis cast. Zappa became a patron of Albritton and moved her to Los Angeles. In 1971, after her apartment was burgled, Zappa and Albritton entrusted her casts to Herb Cohen for safekeeping. Albritton sought to create an art exhibition of her casts, but did not have enough participants. She made no new casts between 1971 and 1980. In 1993, Albritton filed a lawsuit against Cohen because he would not return the casts that she had given him for safekeeping; she later got all but three back. In 2000, Albritton exhibited the casts for the first time in New York City. She also decided to begin casting women's breasts that year. By 2014, she had cast over 70 penises.

In 2009, Albritton won the Rob Pruitt Award at the first annual Guggenheim Art Awards, held at the Solomon R. Guggenheim Museum. She was a candidate for mayor of Chicago in the 2011 election on the "Hard Party" ticket. Albritton died from cerebrovascular disease at a care facility in Chicago on April 21, 2022, at the age of 74. Shortly before her death, Albritton donated one of her casts of Jimi Hendrix's erect penis to the Icelandic Phallological Museum in Reykjavík. In 2023, the Kinsey Institute at Indiana University acquired a collection of her works, including casts, drawings, prints, diaries, and the suitcase she used to transport casting materials and tools.

== Legacy ==
Albritton's life has served as inspiration for multiple pieces of media, such as Good Girls Revolt, The Banger Sisters, and Drive-Away Dolls. In 2001, the documentary film Plaster Caster was made about her. She also contributed to the 2005 BBC Three documentary My Penis and I, made by British filmmaker Lawrence Barraclough about his anxiety over his penis size.

She inspired the songs "Five Short Minutes" by Jim Croce and "Plaster Caster" by Kiss. She is also mentioned in the Momus song "The Penis Song" and the Le Tigre song "Nanny Nanny Boo Boo". Albritton's voice is featured in a recorded telephone conversation in the album Permanent Damage by The GTOs.

== List of casts ==
=== Men ===
- 0002 Joel Coplon (February 16, 1968), friend
- 0003 Al Hernandez (February 18, 1968), friend
- 0004 Jimi Hendrix (February 25, 1968), guitarist – The Jimi Hendrix Experience
- 0005 Noel Redding (March 30, 1968), bass player – The Jimi Hendrix Experience
- 0006 Don Ogilvie (May 5, 1968), road manager – Mandala
- 0007 Bob Pridden (August 1, 1968), road manager and engineer – The Who
- 0008 Eric Burdon (September 3, 1969), singer – The Animals (mold failure, no cast)
- 0009 Richard Cole (November 26, 1968), tour manager – Led Zeppelin
- 0010 Dennis Thompson (February 26, 1969), drummer – MC5
- 0011 Wayne Kramer (February 26, 1969), guitarist – MC5
- 0012 Frank Cook (March 31, 1969), drummer – Pacific Gas & Electric
- 0013 Fritz Richmond (May 12, 1969), washtub bass player – Jim Kweskin Jug Band
- 0014 Michael Vestey (May 30, 1969), record producer
- 0015 Bob Grant (June 5, 1969), conservative radio host
- 0016 Anthony Newley (June 7, 1969), singer/songwriter
- 0017 Danay West (June 11, 1969), manager – Iron Butterfly (never returned by Cohen)
- 0018 Eddie Brigati (June 23, 1969), singer – The Rascals
- 0019 Barry Bono (June 23, 1969), road manager – The Rascals (never returned by Cohen)
- 0020 Harvey Mandel (July 10, 1969), guitarist
- 0021 Lee Mallory (July 22, 1969), singer/songwriter
- 0022 Doug Dillard (July 27, 1969), banjo player – The Dillards (mold failure, no cast)
- 0023 John Barr (July 30, 1969), bass player – The Churls
- 0024 Tony Stevens (September 7, 1969), bass player – Foghat, Savoy Brown (never returned by Cohen)
- 0025 Keef Hartley (September 8, 1969), drummer – Keef Hartley Band, others (mold failure, no cast)
- 0026 Keith Webb (September 9, 1969), drummer – Terry Reid
- 0027 Bob Henrit (April 30, 1970), drummer – Argent, The Kinks
- 0028 Zal Yanovsky (July 14, 1970), singer/guitarist – The Lovin' Spoonful
- 0032 Aynsley Dunbar (September 30, 1970), drummer – The Mothers of Invention, Journey, others
- 0033 Ricky Fataar (October 28, 1971), drummer – Beach Boys, Bonnie Raitt, The Rutles
- 0034 Smutty Smiff (Steven Douglas Smith) (October 12, 1980), bass player – Levi and the Rockats (mold failure, no cast)
- 0035 John Smothers (November 29, 1980), bodyguard – Frank Zappa
- 0036 Ivan Karamazov (Howard Jay Patterson) (June 11, 1981), juggler – The Flying Karamazov Brothers
- 0037 Shane Eason (January 22, 1982), drummer – Loverboy
- 0038 Mary Byker (Ian Garfield Hoxley) (April 16, 1988), singer – Gaye Bykers on Acid
- 0039 Jon Langford (June 29, 1988), singer/guitarist – The Mekons, The Three Johns
- 0040 Chris Connelly (September 8, 1988), singer – Revolting Cocks, Ministry
- 0043 Clint Poppie (Clint Mansell) (September 30, 1989) singer – Pop Will Eat Itself
- 0044 Terryll Loffler (June 30, 1990), filmmaker
- 0045 Brian St. Clair (February 19, 1991), drummer – Rights of the Accused, Triple Fast Action, Local H
- 0047 Jello Biafra (Eric Reed Boucher) (April 29, 1991), singer – Dead Kennedys
- 0048 Pete Shelley (Peter McNeish) (November 10, 1991), singer/songwriter/guitarist – Buzzcocks (mold failure, no cast)
- 0049 Bart Flores (August 8, 1993), drummer – Wreck, Pigface
- 0050 Ronnie Barnett (August 9, 1993) bass player – The Muffs
- 0051 Richard Lloyd (May 11, 1994), guitarist – Television, Matthew Sweet
- 0052 Mike Diana (March 3, 1995), cartoonist
- 0054 Martin Atkins (February 21, 1996), drummer – Public Image Limited, Killing Joke, Pigface, Ministry, Nine Inch Nails
- 0057 Russ Forster (September 29, 1997), filmmaker, fanzine writer, label owner Underdog Records, multi-instrumentalist with Spongetunnel, engineer for Screeching Weasel
- 0060 Momus (Nick Currie) (February 14, 1998), singer/songwriter
- 0062 Jake Shillingford (December 18, 1999), singer – My Life Story
- 0065 Danny Doll Rod (Dan Kroha) (March 15, 2000), guitarist – Demolition Doll Rods
- 0067 Billy Dolan (April 2, 2000), guitarist – Five Style
- 0069 David Yow (August 6, 2000), actor, singer/bassist – The Jesus Lizard, Scratch Acid
- 0071 Bobby Conn (Jeffrey Stafford) (January 18, 2001), singer/songwriter/guitarist
- 0073 Lawrence Barraclough (September 26, 2004), filmmaker (of My Penis and I)
- 0074 Lawrence Barraclough (September 26, 2004), filmmaker
- 0075 Ariel Pink (Ariel Marcus Rosenberg) (February 19, 2006), singer/songwriter
- 0077 Lias Kaci Saoudi (March 20, 2014), singer – Fat White Family
- 0078 Maubert Chang (April 1, 2018), runner, PEA Boys' Cross Country Ewald

=== Women ===
- 00001 Suzi Gardner (May 28, 2000), singer/guitarist – L7
- 00002 Suzi Gardner (May 28, 2000), singer/guitarist – L7
- 00003 Christine Doll Rod (Christine Gomoll) (August 26, 2000), drummer – Demolition Doll Rods
- 00004 Christine Doll Rod (Christine Gomoll) (August 26, 2000), drummer – Demolition Doll Rods
- 00005 Margaret Doll Rod (Margaret Gomoll) (August 26, 2000), singer/guitarist – Demolition Doll Rods
- 00006 Margaret Doll Rod (Margaret Gomoll) (August 26, 2000), singer/guitarist – Demolition Doll Rods
- 00007 Monica BouBou (January 18, 2001), singer/violinist – Wife of Bobby Conn
- 00008 Monica BouBou (January 18, 2001), singer/violinist – Wife of Bobby Conn
- 00009 Lætitia Sadier (January 28, 2001), singer/keyboardist – Stereolab
- 00010 Lætitia Sadier (January 28, 2001), singer/keyboardist – Stereolab
- 00011 Peaches (Merrill Beth Nisker) (May 9, 2001), singer
- 00012 Peaches (Merrill Beth Nisker) (May 9, 2001), singer
- 00013 Sally Timms (May 30, 2001), singer – The Mekons
- 00014 Sally Timms (May 30, 2001), singer – The Mekons
- 00023 Stephanie Barber (February 9, 2002), artist
- 00024 Stephanie Barber (February 9, 2002), artist
- 00027 Karen O (Karen Lee Orzolek) (May 1, 2003), singer – Yeah Yeah Yeahs
- 00028 Karen O (Karen Lee Orzolek) (May 1, 2003), singer – Yeah Yeah Yeahs
- 00029 Cynthia Plaster Caster (self) (May 26, 2013), artist
- 00030 Cynthia Plaster Caster (self) (May 26, 2013), artist
- 00031 Cynthia Plaster Caster (self) (May 26, 2013), artist
- 00032 Cynthia Plaster Caster (self) (May 26, 2013), artist
- 00033 Jan Terri (December 15, 2013), singer/songwriter
- 00034 Jan Terri (December 15, 2013), singer/songwriter

== See also ==
- Adrian Flatt hand collection
