= I'm with the Band: Confessions of a Groupie =

1987 memoir by Pamela Des Barres

- Cover of the first edition
- Author: Pamela Des Barres
- Language: English
- Genre: Memoir
- Publisher: William Morrow and Company
- Publication date: 1987
- Media type: Print (hardcover and paperback)
- Pages: 304
- ISBN: 068806602X

I'm with the Band: Confessions of a Groupie is a 1987 memoir by former groupie Pamela Des Barres. It was a New York Times best seller.

== Overview ==
The book tells the story of Pamela Ann Miller, a groupie who gained notoriety in the 1960s and 1970s through her association with prominent musicians and actors. Pictures of famous musicians and actors accompany the many stories of her time in Los Angeles. She recounts her involvement in the GTOs, a girl group made of groupies which was active on the Sunset Strip scene. She also discusses her time as the live-in nanny for Frank Zappa's children as well as her relationships with Jimmy Page and Don Johnson.

Her escapades include travels to England where she spends time with Mick Jagger and others. She also travels to France, Italy and Austria before coming back home. She later falls in love with Michael Des Barres, an English glam rocker. She ends the book with the story of their wedding and the birth of her son Nicholas Dean Des Barres.

== Publication history ==
After its publication in 1987, I'm with the Band was out of print until its republication in 2003. A 30th anniversary edition was released in May 2018.

In 1995, Des Barres released a CD, I'm with the Band, on which she reads excerpts from the book.

== Reception ==
I'm with the Band was described by Kirkus Reviews as "a classic account of rampant narcissism among guitar egomaniacs." The New York Times described I'm with the Band as "the brightest, sexiest, funniest of... the current outpouring of groupie literature." In The Wall Street Journal, Andrew Ferguson called the memoir a "vulgar kiss-and-tell". A Newsday reviewer said the memoir "is a deft mix of cultural history and gossip". In LA Weekly, Helen Knode observes that the book is "pretty overwrought, both in its emotionalism...and in its expression". Nearly twenty years after the book's initial publication, a reviewer in the Birmingham Post called it "the stuff of legend".

== Adaptation attempts ==
In 1988, Ally Sheedy optioned the rights to I'm with the Band, intending to play the role of Des Barres. In 1995, producer Beverly Camhe proposed to make a movie of I'm with the Band, starring Drew Barrymore, and directed by Tamra Davis.

In 2002, Des Barres and Allison Anders co-wrote a screenplay based on the memoir for the pay-TV network Starz.
