= Safety of emergency medical services flights =

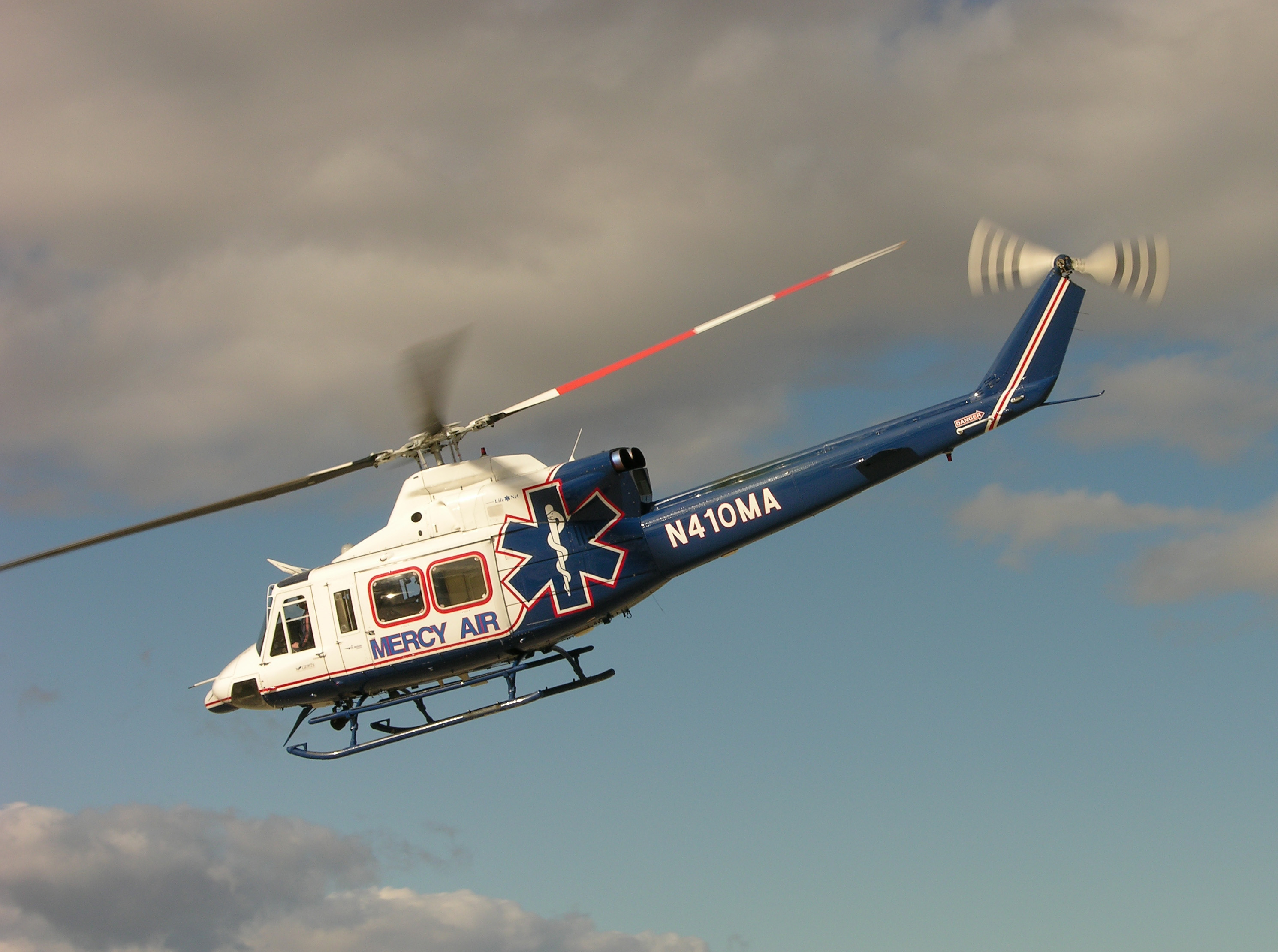
An air ambulance helicopter operated by Mercy Air Service, a private emergency medical services aviation company in the U.S.

The safety of emergency medical services flights has become a topic of public interest in the United States, with the expansion of emergency medical services aviation operations, such as air ambulance and MEDEVAC, and the increasing frequency of related accidents.

== Background ==
Emergency medical services (EMS) aviation operations (conducted with either helicopters or fixed-wing aircraft) provide an important service to the public by transporting seriously ill patients or donor organs to emergency care facilities. The pressure to quickly conduct these operations in various environmental conditions (for example, inclement weather, at night, and unfamiliar landing sites for helicopter operations) makes EMS operations inherently dangerous, and the hazards associated with EMS operations are resulting in an increasing number of accidents. The U.S. National Transportation Safety Board (NTSB) conducted a special investigation and issued a report on January 25, 2006 titled: "Special Investigation Report on Emergency Medical Services Operations". The report was not intended to burden operators with undue requirements or to handicap this vital function in any way; rather the purpose of the report was to identify and recommend operational strategies and technologies that will help ensure that these vital EMS flights arrive safely and continue to provide a valuable service to the public.

Between January 2002 and January 2005, 55 EMS aircraft accidents occurred in the United States^{1} (this number of EMS accidents had not been seen since the 1980s)^{2} these accidents resulted in 54 fatalities and 18 serious injuries (see appendix B of the report for more information). Although the number of flight hours flown by EMS helicopter operations in the United States has increased from about 162,000 in 1991 to an estimated 300,000 in 2005,^{3} the average accident rate has also increased from 3.53 accidents per 100,000 flight hours between 1992 and 2001 to 4.56 accidents per 100,000 flight hours between 1997 and 2001.^{4} As a result, the National Transportation Safety Board initiated a special investigation of these 55 accidents and identified the following recurring safety issues:

- less stringent requirements for EMS operations conducted without patients on board,
- a lack of aviation flight risk evaluation programs for EMS operations,
- a lack of consistent, comprehensive flight dispatch procedures for EMS operations, and
- no requirements to use technologies such as terrain awareness and warning systems (TAWS) to enhance EMS flight safety.

== Examples ==
Of the 55 accidents that occurred between January 2002 and January 2005, the following seven were considered by the NTSB to provide the best examples of the safety issues involved:

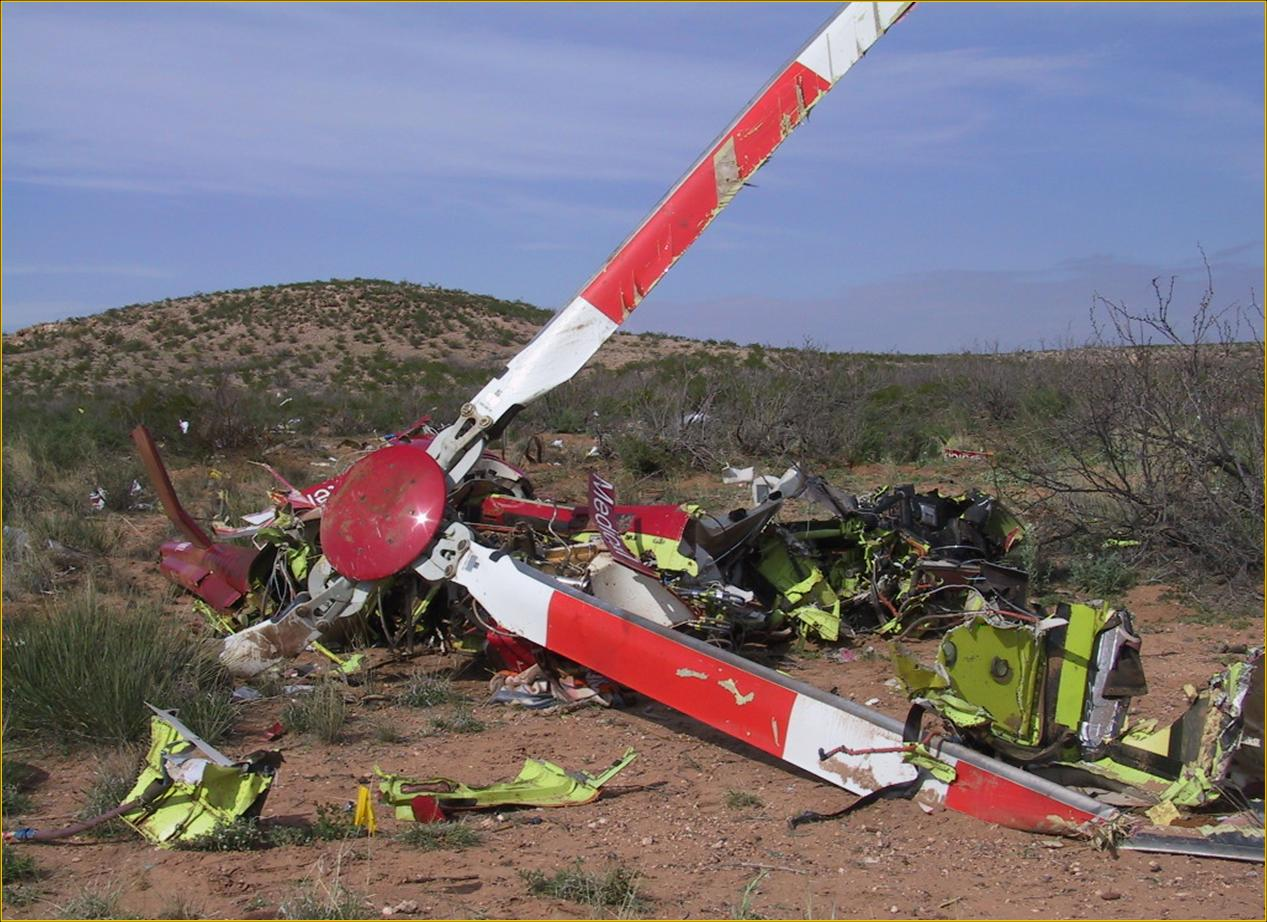
N502MT EMS helicopter wreckage, near Pyote, Texas

- Salt Lake City, Utah (FTW03FA082). On January 10, 2003, an EMS helicopter crashed into terrain while maneuvering in dense fog on an aborted mission to pick up a patient. The pilot and flight paramedic were killed, and the flight nurse was seriously injured. Another service had attempted the same mission, but aborted due to deteriorating weather.
- Redwood Valley, California (LAX04FA076). On December 23, 2003, an EMS helicopter was en route to pick up a patient when it collided with mountainous terrain while operating in high winds and heavy rain. The pilot, flight nurse, and paramedic were killed.
- Dodge City, Kansas (CHI04FA066). On February 17, 2004, an EMS airplane crashed about 5 miles beyond Dodge City Regional Airport while on a repositioning flight. The pilot, flight paramedic, and flight nurse, who were at the end of a 14-hour duty day, were killed.
- Pyote, Texas (FTW04FA097). On March 21, 2004, an EMS helicopter crashed into terrain while maneuvering in reduced visibility conditions while transporting a patient. The pilot, flight paramedic, patient, and patient’s mother were killed, and the flight nurse was seriously injured.
- Newberry, South Carolina (CHI04MA182). On July 13, 2004, an EMS helicopter collided with trees shortly after picking up a patient from an accident site on an interstate highway. The pilot, flight nurse, flight paramedic, and patient were killed. Three other flight crews previously turned down this mission due to unfavorable weather.
- Battle Mountain, Nevada (SEA04MA167). On August 21, 2004, an EMS helicopter crashed into mountainous terrain at night and in deteriorating weather conditions while transporting a patient along a direct route through mountainous terrain rather than taking an indirect route around the high terrain. The pilot, two medical crewmembers, patient, and patient’s mother were killed.
- Rawlins, Wyoming (DEN05FA051). On January 11, 2005, an EMS airplane that was operating in icing conditions crashed when it impacted terrain while en route to pick up a patient. The pilot and two medical crewmembers were killed, and a third medical crewmember sustained serious injuries.

These seven accidents were specifically cited, where applicable, in the report's discussion of each safety issue. More detailed flight histories, as well as probable cause statements for these accidents, were provided in appendix A of the report.

In 2008, midair collisions of emergency flights caused the deaths of 28 crew members and patients.

== Previous NTSB study ==
The Safety Board examined similar safety issues after the occurrence of 59 EMS accidents between May 1978 and December 1986 and concluded in a 1988 safety study^{5} that many areas of EMS operations needed improvement, including weather forecasting, operations during instrument meteorological conditions (IMC), personnel training requirements, design standards, crashworthiness, and EMS operations management. As a result of its findings, the Board issued 19 safety recommendations to the U.S. Federal Aviation Administration (FAA) and others, which have since been closed (see the report appendix G information about these recommendations and their classifications).

Most of the recommendations to the FAA were closed as a result of the June 20, 1991, issuance of Advisory Circular (AC) 135-14A, "Emergency Medical Services/Helicopter (EMS/H)," which addressed equipment, training, crew resource management (CRM), decision-making, flight-following procedures, weather minimums, and the development of safety programs for EMS helicopter flights operating under 14 Code of Federal Regulations (CFR) Part 135. Although the Safety Board expressed concern at the time that the FAA chose to issue an AC instead of regulations, the number of EMS accidents was decreasing, thus the recommendations were closed.^{6}

Despite the guidance provided in AC 135-14A and AC 135-15, EMS aircraft accidents have continued to occur in significant numbers (as shown in table 1 from the report below) for the 15-year period from 1990 to 2005.

Table 1. EMS Accidents in the U.S. From 1990 to 2005 (source: NTSB/SIR-06/01)
			Total Injuries		
Year	# of accidents	# of fatal accidents	Fatal	Serious	Minor
1990	1	0	0	0	0
1991	1	1	4	0	0
1992	3	2	3	4	0
1993	3	2	5	3	3
1994	4	2	6	0	3
1995	5	1	3	0	2
1996	5	3	9	1	0
1997	3	1	4	0	0
1998	11	2	8	5	5
1999	6	0	0	6	0
2000	6	2	7	0	4
2001	13	1	1	2	2
2002	13	6	14	8	4
2003	19	3	3	2	16
2004	19	9	29	7	3
2005	13	6	13	5	5

== Other studies ==
Recent industry publications regarding the safety of EMS aviation operations are consistent with the Safety Board's findings. For example, after an extensive 2-year safety review and risk assessment of helicopter EMS accidents, the Air Medical Physician Association (AMPA) reported in November 2002 that the time of day that flights occur could contribute to accidents.^{7} The report indicated that even though 38 percent of all helicopter EMS flights occur at night, 49 percent of accidents during a 20-year period occurred during nighttime hours. The report also cited controlled flight into terrain (CFIT), in particular during the takeoff or landing sequence, as a common problem, as well as collision with objects (wires were the most common obstacles for EMS helicopters); inaccurate weather forecasts (about 26 percent of helicopter EMS accidents were weather-related, with most occurring because of reduced visibility and IMC while the helicopter was en route); and communications problems with air traffic control (ATC) or a lack of communications due to remote locations and high terrain.

AMPA's report also cited time pressures related to the patient's condition, rapid mission preparation, flight to the patient pick-up location, and low fuel as frequent issues in EMS aircraft accidents. According to a query of the National Aeronautics and Space Administration’s Aviation Safety Reporting System, patient condition was cited in 44 percent of the EMS accidents or incidents reports as a contributor to time pressure leading to inaccurate or hurried preflight planning. In addition, the AMPA report stated that accidents occurred more often when flight crews were en route to pick up a patient than at any other time during flight. A white paper^{8} published by Helicopter Association International in August 2005 examined many of the same issues as AMPA.

== Steps taken ==
On October 7, 2010, the FAA proposed new warning systems and increased training for emergency medical flights to deal with the spate of recent crashes.

== See also ==
- 2006 Mercy Air helicopter accident
- Commission on Accreditation of Medical Transport Systems

== Notes ==
- ^1 Of these 55 EMS aircraft accidents, 41 were helicopter EMS accidents, 16 of which were fatal, resulting in a total of 39 fatalities and 13 serious injuries; 14 were airplane EMS accidents, 5 of which were fatal, resulting in 15 fatalities and 6 serious injuries. Since the initiation of this special investigation in January 2005, 9 additional EMS aircraft accidents have occurred, resulting in 8 fatalities.
- ^2 Comprehensive activity data regarding EMS operations (for example, exposure rates and missions flown) are limited because the sources for these data are generally poor. On May 12, 2005, the Safety Board issued Safety Recommendations A-05-11 through -13 to the Federal Aviation Administration to address the integrity of general aviation flight activity data. Information about these safety recommendations can be found at the Board’s Web site at www.ntsb.gov.
- ^3 "Improving Safety in Helicopter Emergency Medical Services (HEMS) Operations," Helicopter Association International (Alexandria, VA: August 2005).
- ^4 Ira J. Blumen, "A Safety Review and Risk Assessment in Air Medical Transport," Supplement to the Air Medical Physician Handbook, (November 2002): 35.
- ^5 National Transportation Safety Board, Commercial Emergency Medical Service Helicopter Operations, Safety Study NTSB/SS-88-01 (Washington, DC: NTSB, 1988).
- ^6 On November 19, 1990, the FAA issued AC 135-15, "Emergency Medical Services/Airplane," which contained guidance information similar to AC 135-14A. However, the recommendations from the 1988 study focused on EMS helicopter operations, so the closure of these recommendations was based on the issuance of AC 135-14A.
- ^7 Ira J. Blumen, MD, and the UCAN Safety Committee, "A Safety Review and Risk Assessment in Air Medical Transport." Supplement to the Air Medical Physician Handbook, (November 2002): 2.
- ^8 "Improving Safety in Helicopter Emergency Medical Services (HEMS) Operations," Helicopter Association International (Alexandria, VA: August 2005). The Safety Board has reviewed this white paper and determined that this special investigation report further amplifies many of the issues mentioned in the white paper.
