= Shock Trauma =

Shock Trauma may refer to:

- A trauma center
- CALSTAR (California Shock Trauma Air Rescue)
- R Adams Cowley Shock Trauma Center, Baltimore, Maryland
- Shock Trauma Air Rescue Service, Calgary, Alberta

== See also ==
- Shocktrauma, a 1982 Canadian television film
