= ARCH Air Medical Service =

Air ambulance service

ARCH Air Medical Service (ARCH was an initialism for Area Rescue Consortium of Hospitals) is an emergency medical service (EMS) that provides critical care air ambulance service in Missouri, Illinois, and the surrounding regions. Air ambulance programs (also known as Medevac) offer transport by helicopter (rotor-wing) or fixed-wing aircraft. ARCH Air was the twelfth program in the U.S. to offer such services when it began operating in March 1979. Transporting approximately 4,200 patients per year by helicopter, ARCH aircraft are staffed by a pilot, nurse and paramedic. Flights are 80% inter-facility (hospital to hospital) and 20% scene.

Transport is also provided for specialty teams for St Louis Children's Hospital and St. John's Hospital, Springfield, IL neonatal and OB teams

== History ==
- March 1979: The program began operations as "MARC" (Medical Air Rescue Corps) and was based at Saint Louis University Hospital flying the Sikorsky S-55.
- 1980: MARC replaced the Sikorsky S-55 with the Bell JetRanger Helicopter.
- August 1987: MARC became a not-for-profit consortium sponsored by St. Louis' three adult trauma centers (Barnes-Jewish Hospital, St. John's Mercy Medical Center and Saint Louis University Hospital). The name "ARCH" (Area Rescue Consortium of Hospitals) was selected to identify the cooperative effort. Officially named, "ARCH Air Medical Services".
- 1989: Paramedic added to the crew mix of pilot/registered nurse.
- 1990: ARCH replaced the Bell JetRanger with the MBB/Kawasaki BK 117 aircraft, offering cabin class, twin-engine, space, speed and safety.
  1990 also saw the addition of 'fixed-wing' services when it added a Beechcraft King Air for longer distance transports (100–500 miles from base), flights in inclement weather which prohibit rotor wing flights and specialty teams.
- 1993: ARCH opens their own Communications Center after having this service done by a sister Ambulance Company owned by the Consortium to meet its own special needs.
- 1997-2000: ARCH and Mid-America Transplant, both nonprofits, buy services from for-profit SkyLife. But they get services at a 10 percent to 15 percent discount to the cost they were previously paying to charter air services. Skylife therefore expands their 'fixed-wing service' starting with ARCH's two Beechcraft King Air and adding two Diamond 1A jets and one Baron 58. Based at Spirit of St Louis Airport this service would be available for Organ Procurement Teams and Corporate Charters. SkyLife had contracts to provide critical care transport services with the Regional Organ Bank of Illinois in Chicago, the Iowa Statewide Organ Procurement Organization in Iowa City and Barnes-Jewish Physician Services. As well as previous commitments with Cardinal Glennon Children's Hospital, St Johns Mercy Medical Center and St Louis Children's Hospital Specialty transport teams.
- 1999: ARCH gained national recognition for its accomplishments in quality of service when it received accreditation from the Commission on Accreditation of Medical Transport Systems (CAMTS). This accreditation is at the Critical Care Air Ambulance level. ARCH is the only air ambulance service in the St. Louis region to have CAMTS Critical Care designation.
- 2000: ARCH Air Medical Services, Inc. was acquired by Air Methods Corporation, which operates air ambulance programs across America. 2000 also saw the acquisition of LifeBeat Air Medical, from Southeast Missouri Hospital. ARCH is now known as Arch Air Medical Service. Air Methods was not interested in SkyLife Aviation and did not purchase that part of ARCH and therefore Skylife closed their doors December 31, 1999.
- 2009: Arch now utilizes the Bell 407 and Eurocopter EC130's for many outlying bases as well as the BK-117s and 1 Pilatus PC-12
- 2021: Arch received a new Commission on Accreditation of Medical Transport Systems designation on this certification cycle, adding ECMO transport to their existing Critical Care Air Ambulance certification. Arch 1 is currently the only community based service (CBS) helicopter in the nation who has the training and capability to transport ECMO patients without requiring a perfusionist.

== Current Arch Air Medical Service bases ==
The Helicopter Service area is around 150 miles around each base. In 2014, Arch relabeled all of its bases and now the call sign doesn't change regardless of the aircraft in use.

- Arch 1 - Granite City, Illinois - EC-145
- Arch 2 - Litchfield, Illinois - EC-130
- Arch 3 - Effingham, Illinois - Bell 407GXP
- Arch 4 - Sparta, Illinois - EC-130
- Arch 6 - Sullivan, Missouri - Bell 407GXP
- Arch 10 - Farmington, Missouri - Bell 407GXP
- Arch 24 - Carbondale, Illinois - EC-130
- Kids Flight 2 - Cahokia, Illinois - EC-145
- Kids Flight 3 - Cahokia, Illinois - Pilatus PC-12
- Rescue Flight - Highland, Illinois - EC-130
- Saints Flight - Springfield, Illinois - EC-130
- Phelps Air - Rolla, Missouri - Bell 407GXP

In 2013, Arch closed its fixed wing program due to low volumes and the parent company, Air Methods, providing this service through their newly acquired company American Jets.

In 2012, Air Methods opened its central dispatching center in Omaha, Nebraska and Arch dispatch was removed from service.

Also included in the Arch region are the following community-based services.

- LifeStar 1 - Joliet, Illinois - EC-135
- REACT 1 - Rockford, Illinois - EC-145

The following hospital-based services are sister programs of Arch and are owned and operated by Air Methods.

- UCAN - University of Chicago Chicago, IL N365UC EC-145
- AirLife 1 - Carle Foundation Hospital Urbana, Illinois EC-130 (returned to hospital based from community based July 2018)
- Airlife 2 - Carle Foundation Hospital Olney, Illinois EC-130
