= What Could Possibly Go Wrong =

What Could Possibly Go Wrong(?) may refer to:

- What Could Possibly Go Wrong (album), by Dominic Fike, 2020
- What Could Possibly Go Wrong? (book), a 2012 non-fiction novel by Tony Bleetman
- "What Could Possibly Go Wrong", a 1993 TV pilot based on the Bubsy video game series
