= Museum of Aerospace Medicine =

- Hangar 9
- U.S. National Register of Historic Places
- Recorded Texas Historic Landmark
- Location within Texas Location within the United States
- Location: Brooks Air Force Base Inner Circle Rd., San Antonio, Texas
- Coordinates: 29°20′37″N 98°26′37″W
- Area: less than one acre
- Built: 1918
- Built by: Thomas & Harmon Co.
- NRHP reference No.: 70000895
- Added to NRHP: May 21, 1970

The Edward H. White II Museum of Aerospace Medicine was a museum of the United States Air Force and was located in Hangar 9 at Brooks Air Force Base, San Antonio, Texas. Brooks Air Force Base closed in 2011 under Base Realignment and Closure Commission (BRAC) procedures, and the museum closed at the same time.

Brooks Field Hangar 9 is located in the Brooks City-Base mixed-use community being developed on the site of the former air base. The development authority has proposed to preserve the historic area around the property.

== History ==
The Bexar County Historical Survey Committee assumed sponsorship of the restoration of Brooks Field Hangar 9 of the old Army Air Corps Brooks Field. The restoration of the Hangar would be used to house an aviation museum. This museum was intended to display the early history of Brooks Field and to preserve and display an extensive collection of photographs and equipment related to aviation and aerospace medicine. It became the Edward H. White II Museum of Aerospace Medicine.

The museum was named after San Antonio native Ed White, an astronaut and the first American to "walk" in space.

== Historic registration ==
The Brooks Field Hangar 9 was accepted and listed in the National Register of Historic Places in 1970 and became a National Historic Landmark in 1976. The State of Texas has designated this old Hangar 9 as a Recorded Texas Historic Landmark, and a City of San Antonio Historic Landmark.

== See also ==
- United States Air Force School of Aerospace Medicine
- United States Air Force Medical Service
- Flight Surgeon
- Flight medic
- Air Force Materiel Command
