= Certified flight paramedic =

Certified flight paramedic emblem

A certified flight paramedic (FP-C) is a person who has met the advanced certification requirements for flight paramedics established for this designation by the International Board of Specialty Certification (IBSC), a not-for-profit organization responsible for the administration and development of specialty certification exams for critical care professionals. The FP-C exam was the first specialty paramedic certification offered by the Board for Critical Care Transport Paramedic Certification in 2000. This certification is designed for experienced paramedics who have demonstrated advanced knowledge of critical care medicine.

The FP-C, CCP-C, and/or Critical Care Emergency Medical Transport Program (CCEMTP) certifications are often a requirement to work as a flight paramedic in the United States. The FP-C does not have an associated course and does not endorse any specific course in order to remain impartial and maintain neutrality. The FP-C is considered comparable in difficulty to the Critical Care Paramedic Certification (CCP-C). Experience in the air medical and/or critical care transport fields are recommended before attempting to take the exam. There is no minimum education component required and the examination does not require any field experience. In addition, there is no practical skills test associated with the examination, unlike the NREMT Paramedic exam. A candidate must hold an unrestricted paramedic license in the state or country of practice, and have a significant knowledge of ACLS, PALS, NRP and BTLS/ITLS and current CAMTS standards.

== Examination ==
Similarly to specialty board certification in other health professionals such as ER Nurses and Emergency Medicine Physicians, the FP-C specialty certification is a voluntary credentialing process designed to validate essential knowledge and judgment required for safe and competent practice. Such certifications provide designations to paramedic professionals who demonstrate the knowledge and skills essential to critical care paramedics. Unlike the NREMT, which has been adopted by 46 states since its inception, the IBSC is officially recognized in 15 states but remains recognized in many flight paramedic agencies as a pre-requisite or requisite requirement to be hired.

Unlike the NREMT examination, which is required in most states for entry-level paramedic licensure and reciprocity, the FP-C is a professional board certification that evaluates knowledge well above and beyond the basic scope of practice of most licensed paramedics.

The exam is developed by the Board for Critical Care Transport Paramedic Certification (BCCTPC), a subsidiary of IBSC and administered by Prometric. Oversight for the exam process is provided by Applied Measurement Professionals (AMP), a statistical body that ensures the certification process is in compliance. The methods used by AMP are consistent with professional and technical guidelines detailed in the Standards for Educational and Psychological Testing (1999) by the American Educational Research Association, the American Psychological Association and the National Council on Measurement in Education. These standards provide the research framework that is used as a basis for validity of certification. The methodology used meets or exceeds the current professional and governmental standards to assure the legal defensibility of the exam, as well as the standards of the National Commission for Certifying Agencies (NCCA) and the National Organization for Competency Assurance (NOCA). The FP-C has become the standard for critical care paramedic certification and is the highest level of specialty paramedic certification in the USA. When an individual obtains a FP-C Certification, the general public, employers, and state licensing authorities know that the individual has demonstrated competency and that "paramedics holding this specialty certification qualify to work in the domain of paramedicine beyond that of an entry-level paramedic."

== Exam Outline ==
Each test form includes 10 unscored pretest items in addition to the 125 scored items for a total of 135 items in 2.5-hours. Questions that are unscored are spread throughout the test are and unknown to the test taker. It is similar to the NREMT exam format which also uses unscored questions. The exam is available in either CBT (Computer based) or traditional paper/pencil formats. The passing standard for each certification exam is set by a designate IBSC Sub-specialty Board, Test Committee or Subject Matter Expert Group. Members of these groups are nationally recognized specialists whose combined expertise encompasses the breadth of clinical knowledge in the specialty area. Members include educators, managers and providers, incorporating the perspectives of both the education and practice environments. In setting the passing standard, the committee considers many factors, including relevant changes to the knowledge base of the field as well as changes in the characteristics of minimally qualified candidates for certification.

Certified Flight Paramedic Candidate Handbook (Content Outline)
Question Category	Number of Questions
Safety/Transport Fundamentals and Post Incident Survival	10
Flight Physiology	9
Advanced Airway Management Techniques	15
Trauma and Burn Emergencies	19
Neurological Emergencies	9
Cardiopulmonary Emergencies	25
Toxic and Environmental Exposures	9
Perinatal and Pediatric Emergencies	19
General Medical Patient	10
Unscored	10
TOTAL	135

The passing standard for an exam is based on a specified level of mastery of content in the specialty area through a pass/fail and not numeric grading system. Therefore, no predetermined percentage of examinees will pass or fail the exam. The IBSC sets a content-based standard, using the Modified-Angoff Method by which a cut-score is determined. The exams are updated continuously with questions and content, but all exam forms meet the same examination construction standards as described above. The domain of knowledge for each examination is evaluated and modified every 3 – 5 years.

=== Retest Policy ===
The exam is allowed to be taken up to 6 times. If the candidate fails the 6th attempt, they will not be granted any further permission to the examination, as their previous unsuccessful attempts demonstrated the candidate would not have the knowledge and or understanding of the material to perform in the profession.

Retesting Policy and Hold Times (By Attempt Failed)
Attempt	Procedure
First Attempt Failed	Wait period of 30 days before applying to retake the exam.
Second Attempt Failed	Wait period of 30 days before applying to retake the exam.
Third Attempt Failed	90 days and submission of signed documentation from a professional educator that the candidate is prepared to complete the examination.
Fourth Attempt Failed	6 months and submission of a letter from their medical director outlining the additional education completed, as well as physician documentation that the candidate now understands the information outlined in the examination's DCO.
Fifth Attempt Failed	The candidate is restricted from reapplying to retest for a period of one year. This is the candidate's last opportunity to retake the exam.
Sixth Attempt Failed	The candidate is permanently barred from taking the FP-C exam and can not apply to retake the exam.

During the wait time-period the candidate is encouraged to complete structured, exam focused education that allows for a better and more thorough understanding of the topics outlined in the Detailed Content Outline (DCO). This is to ensure the candidate has sought additional education and has worked in conjunction with a professional educator (i.e.: Nurse, Physician, EMS Instructor, etc.) to better understand the information outlined in the examination's DCO.

== Renewal ==
The FP-C certification is issued to a candidate who has successfully passed the exam and is valid for four years. Renewal may be done through retaking the test or through the recertification process.

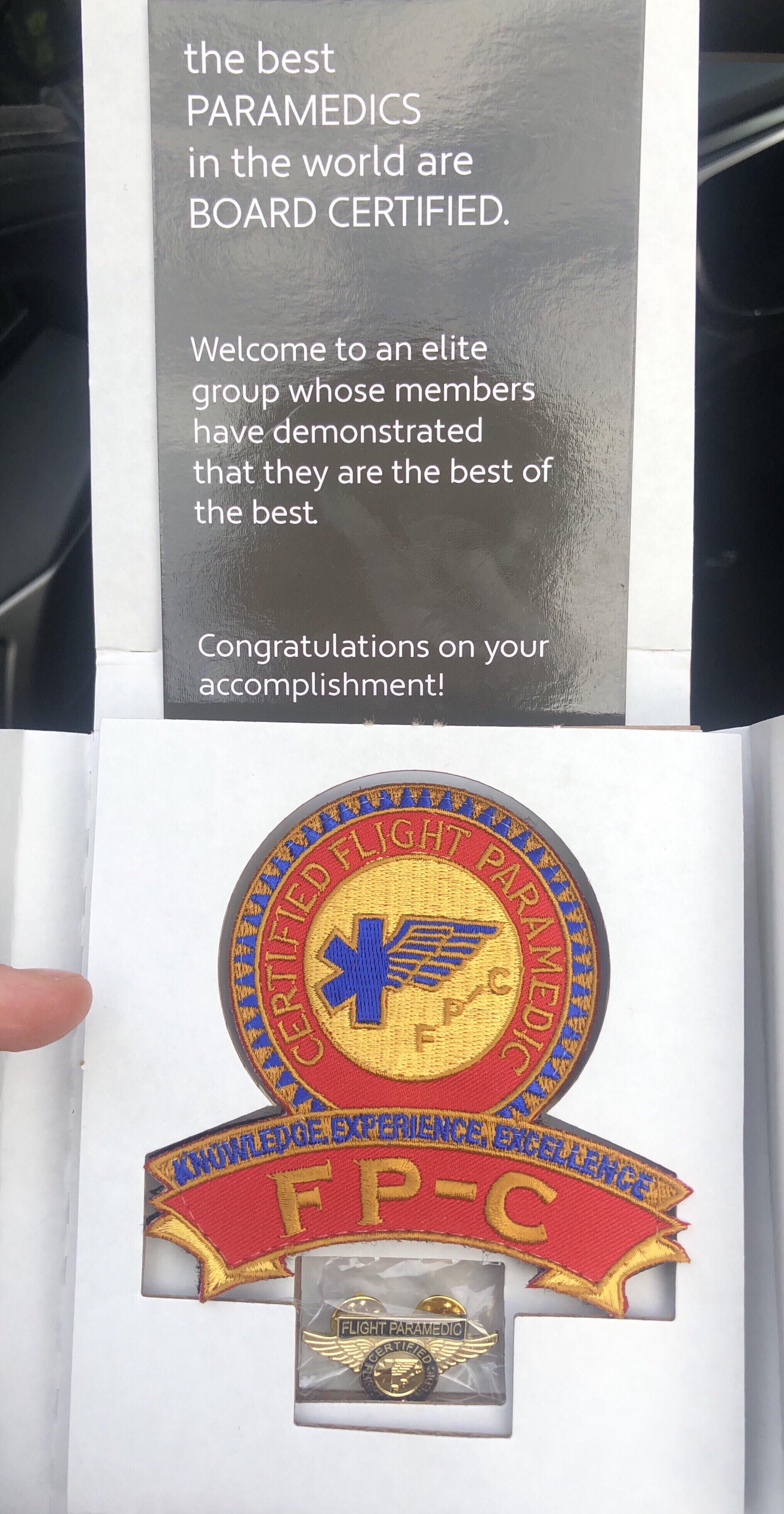
FP-C Patch and Pin.

Recertification is established through continuing education. A minimum of 100 approved continuing education (CE) credits must be submitted no later than one month prior to the expiration of the certification and a minimum of 75 of CECs must be completed no later than 3 months prior to the expiration. At least 16 clinical hours must be obtained by completing an approved review class. Programs listed on the IBSC recertification page have submitted an Approved Review Course Application from IBSC's Detailed Content Outline (or Blueprint) that includes a letter from their Program Director outlining why they should be approved to teach this course, a content outline, a letter of support from the medical director, a copy of medical director's resume as well as a list all faculty for the class and a copy of each faculty member's resume and credentials and a list of proposed course dates and locations. The IBSC evaluates this information to validate that 16 clinical hours meet the requirements of the Detailed Content Outline to ensure that the education meets basic requirements for recertification. If the FP-C renewal candidate has not achieved the required 100 CECs by expiration they must retake the FP-C exam to re-certify.

== Statistics ==
As of July 11, 2019, there are 7,014 certified flight paramedics worldwide, 656 of whom hold dual certification as a CCP-C in the United States.

As of 2016, fifteen states formally recognize Paramedic Specialty Certification as a reliable measure of competency with no additional cost to the States. The number has not been updated to reflect current trends.

Currently, first time pass rate for FP-C is 67%. First time pass rate for CCP-C is 48%.

== See also ==
- International Association of Flight Paramedics
- Flight Nurse
- CFRN - Board of Certification for Emergency Nursing
