= International College of Advanced Practice Paramedics =

- Abbreviation: I-CAPP
- Formation: 1986
- Headquarters: Snellville, GA
- Website: i-capp.org

The International College of Advanced Practice Paramedics (I-CAPP) is a non-profit organization that represents critical care paramedics that transport critically ill or injured patients by means of airborne (rotor and fixed wing) or ground vehicles. I-CAPP, formerly International Association of Flight and Critical Care Paramedics (IAFCCP) was founded in 1986 with the purpose of providing education and representation to flight paramedics and, as of February 2011, has expanded their representation to ground critical care paramedics.

The mission statement is to "provide advocacy, leadership, professional development, and education opportunities for specialty care paramedics".

== Education ==
Critical care paramedic certifications (FP-C and CCP-C), are exams developed by the Board for Critical Care Transport Certification and are available for all paramedics who hold an unrestricted and current license or certificate. While membership is encouraged before taking the exam, by way of a substantial discount on the testing fee, it is not required. The organization also provides educational and networking resources on their website for the purpose of educating flight paramedics on patient care and current industry standards. It also maintains advocacy for critical care paramedics in the United States through its Government and Legislative Affairs Committee (GLAC). The purpose of the GLAC is to "provide local representation in every state to communicate the needs and current events between the IAFCCP and its members.". As of July 2019, there are 4,714 registered members divided into 26 global region chapters.
