= Flight paramedic =

Paramedic qualified to work in an aeromedical environment

A flight paramedic is a paramedic who provides care to sick and injured patients in an aeromedical environment. Typically a flight paramedic works with a registered nurse, physician, respiratory therapist, or another paramedic. Flight paramedics must have an advanced medical knowledge along with years of clinical experience. Flight paramedics in the United States usually hold certifications such as the FP-C or the CCP-C, while in countries like the United Kingdom, they are typically required to hold a postgraduate certificate in critical care as a minimum, with many holding a master's degree in advanced practice or aeromedical critical care.

== Education/training ==
=== United States ===
Within the US, the minimum requirements for flight paramedics generally include:

- Licensed as a paramedic by a state Emergency Medical Services (EMS) board
- 3-5 years as the lead paramedic in a volume EMS ground service
- Advanced Cardiovascular Life Support, Pediatric Advanced Life Support, Pre-Hospital Trauma Life Support or ITLS

Additional requirements may include:

- Neonatal Resuscitation Program
- Certifications such as the FP-C or CCP-C (usually required within 2 years of commencing employment in the United States)
- Critical care classes such as the CCEMTP by UMBC.
- Postgraduate certificate or master's degree (United Kingdom/British Commonwealth)

== Roles and responsibilities ==
Roles and responsibilities vary by organisation and country. Typical responsibilities include:

- Perform as a member of an aeromedical evacuation team
- Plan and prepare for aeromedical evacuation missions
- Provide in-flight critical care to patients
- Care for patients with both medical and traumatic issues
- Possess advanced understanding of mechanical ventilation, hemodynamic support, vasoactive medications and intensive care
- Possess specialized clinical skills combined with knowledge, theory, education and expertise in hospital and pre-hospital environments
- Perform advanced medical procedures without supervision of a doctor such as rapid sequence intubation, ventilator management, finger thoracostomy/chest tube insertion, central line placement, intra-aortic balloon pump management, pericardiocentesis, administration of general anesthetics and paralytics for intubation, and initiating, maintaining, and titrating numerous medications not found on a typical ambulance.

== See also ==
- Aircrew (Flight crew)
- Air medical services - Use of aircraft to transport medical patients.
- Certified Flight Paramedic - Certification for flight paramedics.
- Combat medic - A soldier who provides medical care.
- Medic - A practitioner of medicine.
- Museum of Aerospace Medicine
- Royal Flying Doctor Service of Australia
- Enlisted Medics (U.S. Air Force)
