= 2006 Mercy Air Bell 412 crash =

Aviation accident in the United States

2006 Mercy Air helicopter accident
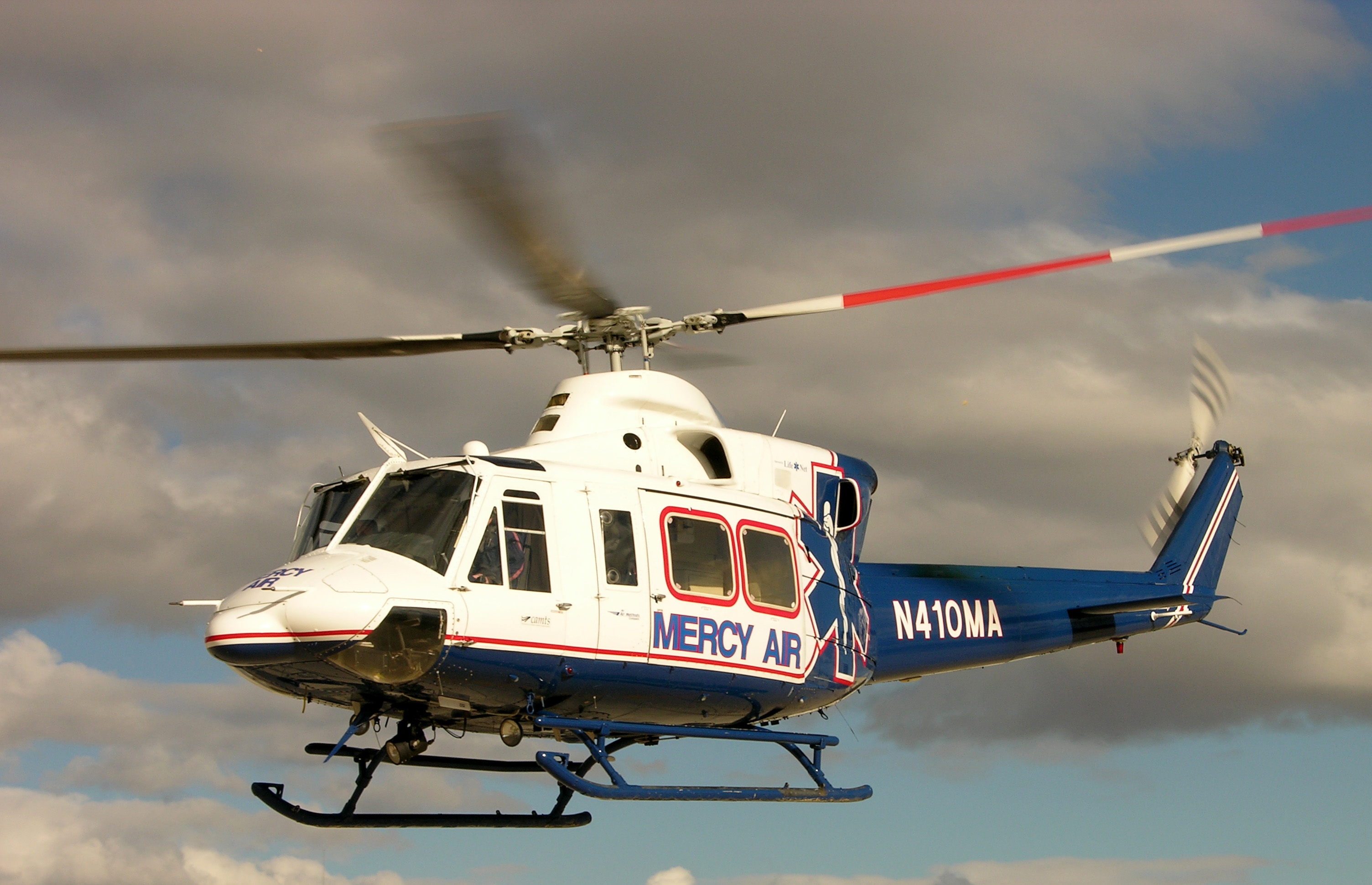
- The accident aircraft, Mercy Air 2, departs Mojave, CA in February 2005

Accident
- Date: December 10, 2006
- Summary: Crashed in fog
- Site: Cajon Pass, San Bernardino County, California

Aircraft
- Aircraft type: Bell 412SP
- Operator: Mercy Air Services, Inc.
- Registration: N410MA
- Destination: Southern California; Logistics Airport, Victorville, California.
- Crew: 3
- Fatalities: 3
- Survivors: 0

The 2006 Mercy Air helicopter accident occurred on December 10, 2006, about 17:55 Pacific Standard Time, when a Bell 412SP helicopter, call sign "Mercy Air 2" impacted mountainous terrain near Hesperia, California and the Cajon Pass. The commercial helicopter pilot and two medical crew members were killed, and the helicopter was destroyed by impact forces and a postcrash fire.

On July 30, 2008, the National Transportation Safety Board (NTSB) released its probable-cause report on the accident. According to the NTSB, the probable cause of the crash was "the pilot's inadvertent encounter with instrument meteorological conditions and subsequent failure to maintain terrain clearance." The dark night conditions, fog, and mountainous terrain were ruled to be contributing factors.

== Accident details ==
The Bell 412SP helicopter took off on a cross-country repositioning flight from Loma Linda University Medical Center (94CL), Loma Linda, California, at 17:42, with a planned destination of Southern California Logistics Airport (VCV), Victorville, California. Mercy Air 2 had transported a woman injured in a horse-riding accident in Phelan, California, to Loma Linda, and was returning to its assigned base at the time of the accident, with only the pilot and two medical crew members on board. LifeNet, Inc., doing business as Mercy Air Service, Inc., was operating the helicopter under the provisions of 14 CFR Part 91. An FAA representative stated the helicopter was being operated under visual flight rules and was not being handled by air traffic control, a practice he called "perfectly normal."

At 18:00, the San Bernardino County Fire Department dispatch center started to receive numerous calls of an object falling from the sky, an explosion, and fire northeast of Interstate 15 in the area of Oak Hills. The first fire department responders to the accident site reported that the area was covered by intermittent waves of fog, which made locating the wreckage difficult.

The accident site was located on mountainous terrain on a 45° slope at an elevation of 4,000 to 4,300 ft (1,200 to 1,300 m) above mean sea level, below a large electrical transmission tower, a little more than a mile east of I-15, and north of Highway 138. It is in a rural area with dirt roads, and no streetlights. The approximate global positioning system (GPS) coordinates of the primary wreckage were: 34°20.534′N 117°25.884′W.

First responders reported that upon their arrival, the scene was fully engulfed in fire. The postimpact fire consumed around 2 acres (8,100 m^{2}) of mountainside, and made any reconstruction of the wreckage impossible. The first identified point of impact, a ground scar located next to the separated tail boom and the left skid, was near the base of the mountainous terrain, with the debris path emanating upslope. The debris path consisted of the tail boom, both skids, both engines, the main rotor assembly, and various other fuselage panels. The energy path was measured on a 155° bearing from the first identified impact point. No distress call was received from the aircraft. Initial speculation that the aircraft went down after hitting electrical wires was quickly eliminated as a cause. Examination of the maintenance and flight department records revealed no unresolved maintenance discrepancies against the helicopter prior to departure. The helicopter was built in 1987 and refurbished in May 2004, and had no previous accident history.

=== Weather information ===
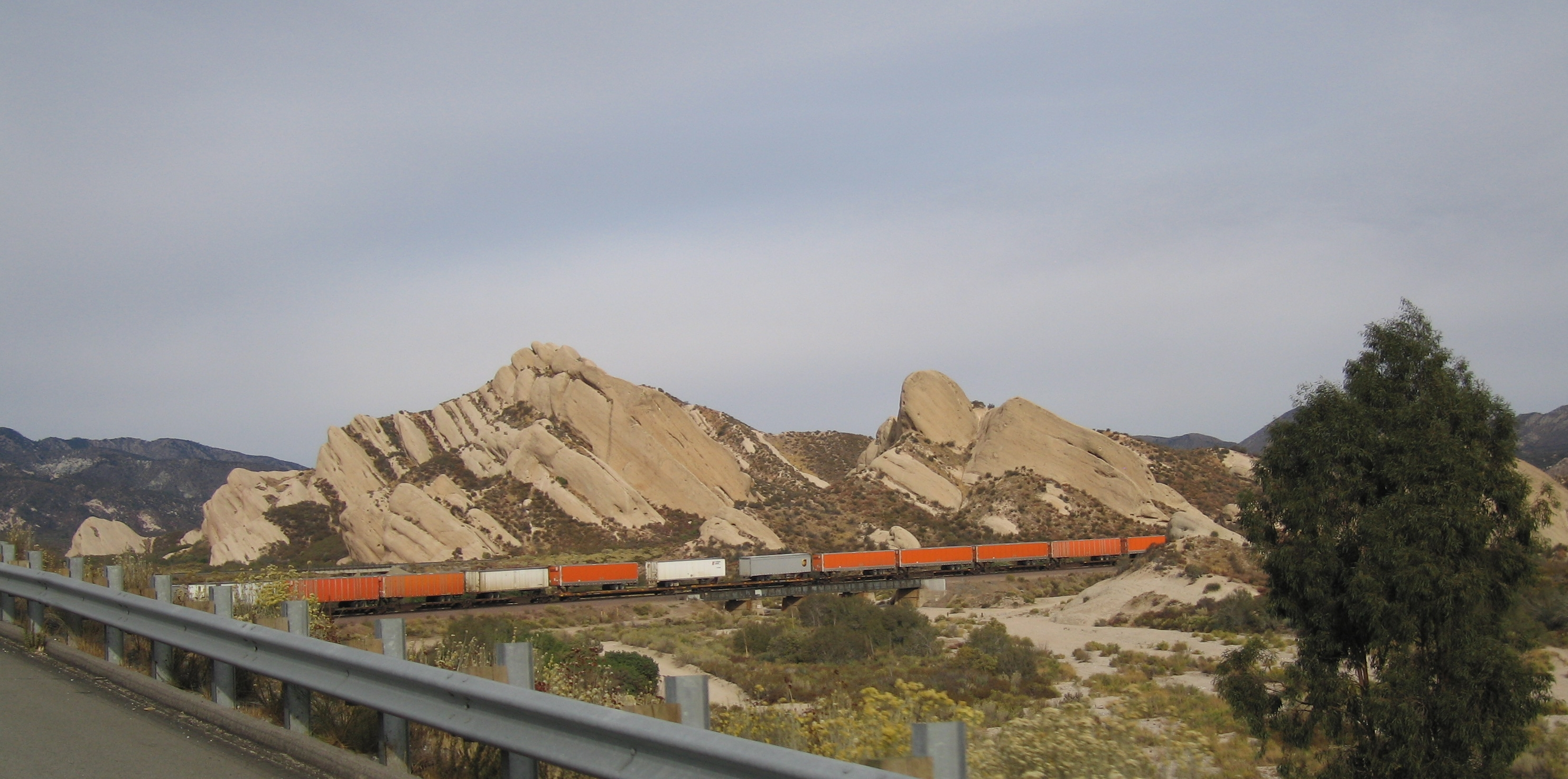
Cajon Pass

Visual meteorological conditions predominantly prevailed along the route of flight, and a company visual flight rules (VFR) flight plan had been filed. The Cajon Pass area is known for high wind, turbulence, and fog. Fog was heavy due to a marine layer that rolled in at 4,000 ft (1,200 m) and winds were said to be erratic.

Reported weather conditions from VCV, 15 nmi (28 km) northeast of the accident site, were visibility 10 mi (16 km); a broken cloud layer at 3,800 ft (1,200 m), and an overcast cloud layer at 4,900 ft (1,500 m); temperature 11 °C; dew point 3 °C; altimeter 30.17 inHg (1,022 hPa). Weather conditions at Ontario International Airport, Ontario, California, 19 nmi (35 km) southwest of the accident site, were visibility 10 mi (16 km); a broken cloud layer at 3,800 ft (1,200 m), and an overcast cloud layer at 5,500 ft (1,700 m); temperature 13 °C; dew point 6 °C; altimeter 30.19 inHg (1,022 hPa).

=== GPS data ===
Mercy Air 2 was equipped with the OuterLink Automatic Flight Following System, a satellite-based tracking system that reports the helicopter's location to the ground base while it is in operation. The unit installed in the accident helicopter reported date, time, latitude, and longitude at 30 sec intervals. The installed system was capable of recording the altitude and airspeed, but Mercy Air had not yet installed the software upgrade required to make those parameters functional.

The NTSB investigator-in-charge reviewed the data from the Outerlink system. The satellite data indicated that the helicopter departed from 94CL and flew towards the Cajon Pass in a northwest direction. The flight path then followed the northbound Interstate 15 until it had almost reached the summit of the Cajon Pass. The global positioning system (GPS) tracked the helicopter as it continued toward the northeast, while the Interstate turned toward the north. The last known position of Mercy Air 2 was recorded at 17:55, and was 0.3 nmi (560 m) northwest of the first identified impact point.

== Accident histories ==
=== Company ===
Air Methods, Corp., the Colorado-based parent company of Mercy Air, is the largest emergency medical services helicopter operator in the United States, with a fleet of 208 medical transport helicopters at the time of this accident. Air Methods had, after this accident, a total of 19 accidents leading to the deaths of 21 people nationwide according to the NTSB's records. Air Methods companies have had three other fatal accidents in the last 10 years. On September 7, 2002, three crew members died when a Mercy Air helicopter based in Nevada crashed in Nipton, California after the main rotor blades separated while maneuvering in flight after dark. In January 2005, an Air Methods helicopter crashed in Washington, D.C., with two dead and one injured, and another crashed in Mississippi killing one. Craig Yale, the vice president of corporate development for Air Methods, stated in a news conference shortly after the accident that, "We fly over 100,000 hours a year, 85,000 missions a year, and in doing so have had very few fatal accidents over a 10-year period."

=== Industry ===
The U.S. FAA estimates that 650 emergency medical helicopters are in operation in the United States. In a 2006 NTSB special investigation report on the industry, the board reported emergency medical helicopter flight hours increased by 54% since 1991, but the rate of accidents per 100,000 flight hours increased 77%. FAA reports show that these accidents frequently involve controlled flight into terrain, spatial disorientation, and weather. "On the accident reports I have reviewed, there doesn't appear to be a common thread linking these accidents," according to independent safety expert Barry Schiff. Three out of four of those accidents, though, occurred when no patient was on board the aircraft—a fact aviation lawyer and helicopter pilot Justin Green said is attributed to lax regulations by the FAA. When no patient or organ is aboard, the helicopters can be operated VFR under less restrictive Part 91 regulations, as the accident flight was. The NTSB had previously recommended that the FAA require all operations to be conducted under the more restrictive Part 135 regulations whenever medical personnel are on board.

== Related information ==
=== Post accident information ===
The company grounded most of its fleet following the crash, and began resuming normal operations two days later on Tuesday December 12, 2006. An estimated 3,000 people, mostly uniformed nurses, medics and firefighters, attended a three-hour memorial for the flight crew a week after the accident. This accident also led to increased efforts to establish a trauma center in the high desert region of San Bernardino and Los Angeles counties.
