= CALSTAR =

US air medical services company

- Type: Subsidiary
- Industry: Air medical services
- Founded: San Francisco, California, 1983
- Headquarters: McClellan, California, U.S.
- Area served: Parts of Northern California, Central California and Northern Nevada
- Key people: Lynn Malmstrom (CEO, Ken Meehan Chairman of the Board)
- Parent: REACH (Global Medical Response)
- Website: www.calstar.org

CALSTAR (California Shock Trauma Air Rescue) is a regional air medical services company serving California and northern Nevada. It began operations as a nonprofit air ambulance provider on the West Coast.

== History ==
CALSTAR was founded as a nonprofit public-benefit corporation in 1983 and began flight operations the following year using a leased BK 117 helicopter based at Peninsula Hospital in Burlingame, California. In its first year, they flew 235 patients.

By 2010, CALSTAR’s operations had increased to gain ten helicopters. The EMS bases are located throughout Northern and Central California, and a fixed wing program providing inter-facility transport services from the company’s headquarters at McClellan Park (formerly referred to as McClellan Air Force Base) in Sacramento, California.

Since its inception, CALSTAR has provided air medical transport services to over 50,000 critically ill and injured patients and logged over 75,000 accident-free flight hours.

CALSTAR was acquired by for-profit competitor REACH, a subsidiary of Air Medical Group Holdings, in 2016. Air Medical Group Holdings merged with American Medical Response to form Global Medical Response in 2018.

== Flight operations ==
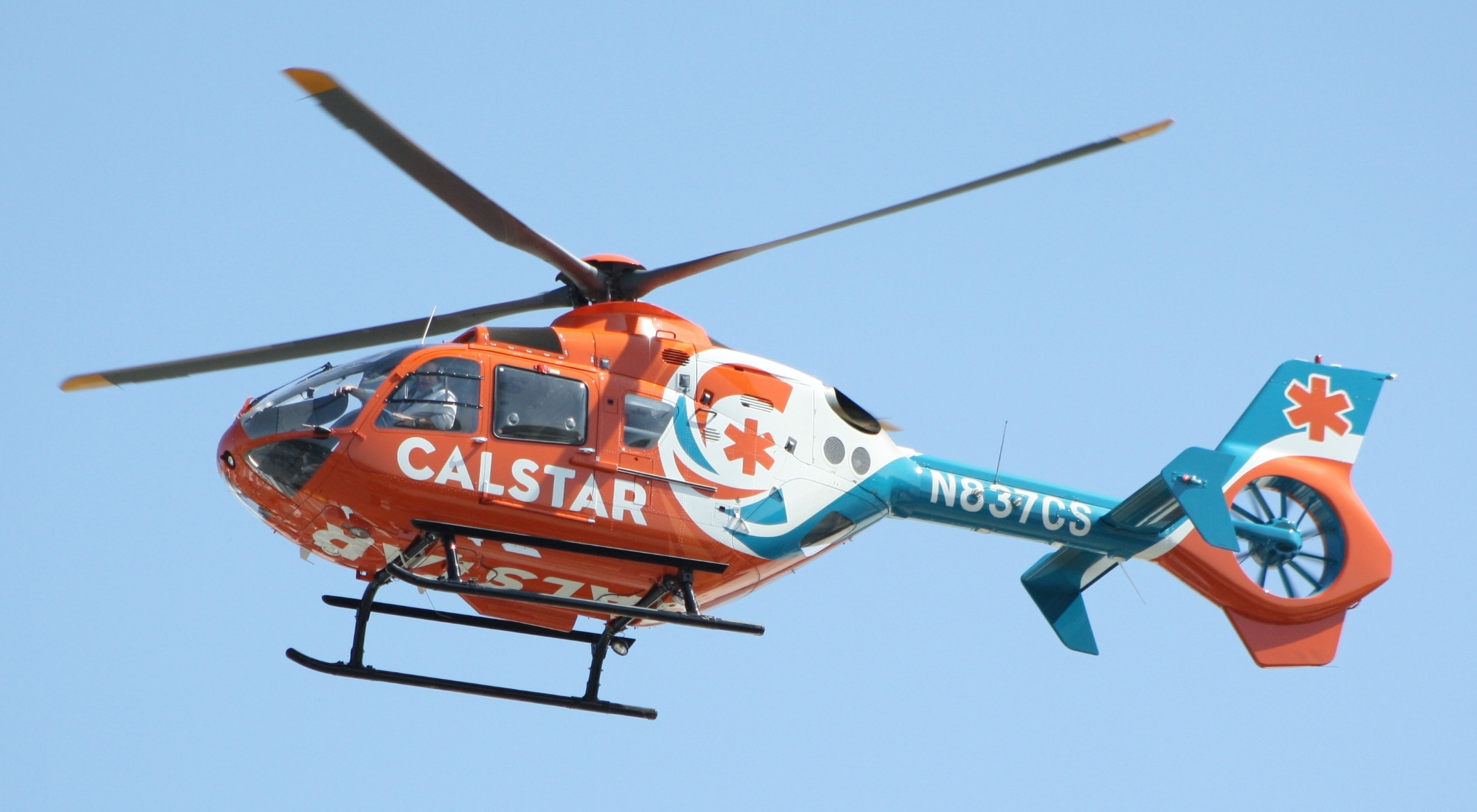
A CALSTAR Eurocopter EC135 on final approach.

All CALSTAR pilots have a minimum of 3,000 hours of pilot-in-command flight time. CALSTAR operates under its own Federal Aviation Administration (FAA) Part 135 Air Carrier Certificate and Part 145 Repair Station and is directly responsible for all aspects of its flight operations and aircraft maintenance.

CALSTAR operates a fleet of MBB Bo 105LS and MD 902 Explorer helicopters. In 2012, eight Eurocopter EC 135 helicopters were ordered and as of January 2014, six had been delivered. All aircraft are modified with medical interiors, high skid gear, high-intensity search lights and communication systems.

CALSTAR also utilizes King Air B200 light twin-engine airplanes for long-range inter-facility transports.

== Medical operations ==
Each CALSTAR flight crew is staffed with two registered nurses. CALSTAR flight nurses must achieve and maintain Certified Flight Registered Nurse (CFRN), Critical Care Registered Nurse (CCRN), Advanced Cardiac Life Support (ACLS) and Pediatric Advanced Life Support (PALS) certifications.

CALSTAR flight nurses deliver care under the medical control provided by CALSTAR's medical director, in accordance with the California Nurse's Practice Act of 1974 and specific company procedures and protocols. All medical care provided by CALSTAR is held under scrutiny from the organization's quality assurance/quality improvement program, which is protected under Section 1157.5 of the California Evidence Code.

Since 2001, CALSTAR has been fully accredited by the Commission on Accreditation of Medical Transport Systems (CAMTS), which acknowledges excellence in patient care, safety, and education. Accreditation must be maintained through rigorous evaluation every three years.

== Accomplishments ==
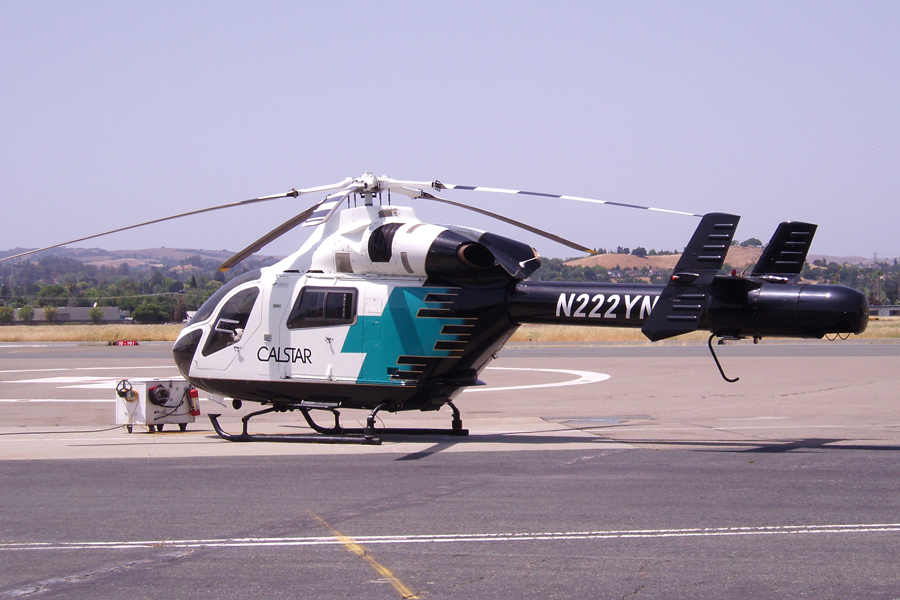
Calstar MD Explorer.

In 2009, CALSTAR completed a six-year project to retrofit its fleet of Eurocopter BO-105 LS aircraft with upgraded Rolls-Royce 250-C30P model engines, an enhancement designed to improve safety while significantly reducing emissions and operating costs. The FAA granted CALSTAR a Supplemental Type Certificate (STC) approving the engine retrofit for the entire BO-105 LS fleet nationwide.

CALSTAR worked closely on the project with Rolls-Royce, as well as Steve Fossett. Fossett, a businessman and adventurer, had selected the BO-105 LS for an endurance record he was hoping to set. He was so interested in the C30P engine upgrade that he lent CALSTAR his personal aircraft to conduct all of the required flight testing. The retrofitted BO-105 LS was later nicknamed the "Fossett Special."

CALSTAR also received FAA approval in 2009 for the first three helicopters Wide Area Augmentation System (WAAS) GPS approach procedures in the world. The WAAS procedures were developed by Hickok & Associates, who have since implemented additional helicopter WAAS approaches for air medical providers throughout the United States, Europe and Asia.

== See also ==
- California Emergency Medical Services Authority
- Emergency medical services
- Golden hour (medicine)
- Medical evacuation
