= Air medical services =

Use of air vehicles to transport patients

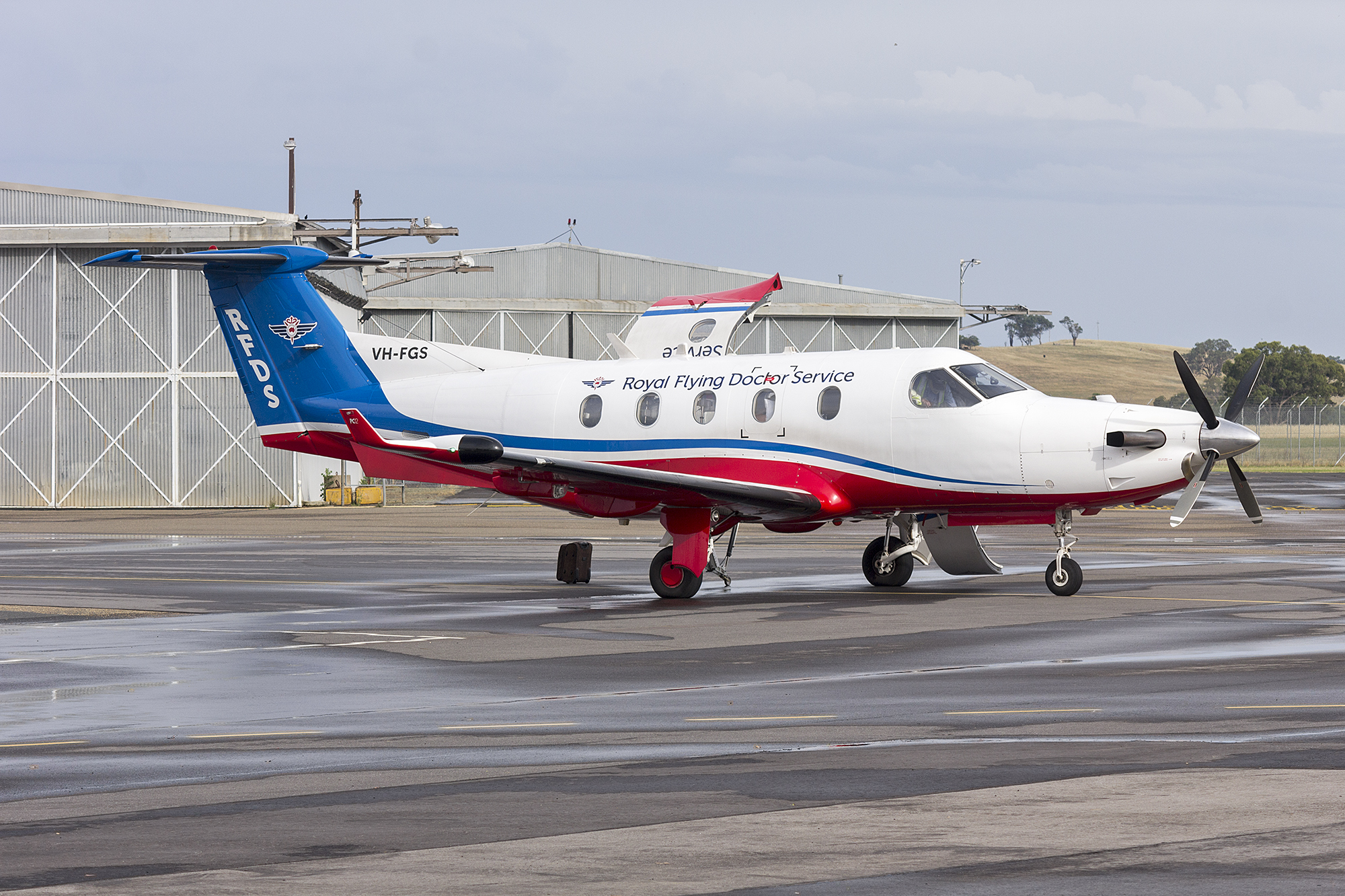
A Pilatus PC-12/45 utility aircraft of the Royal Flying Doctor Service, Australia

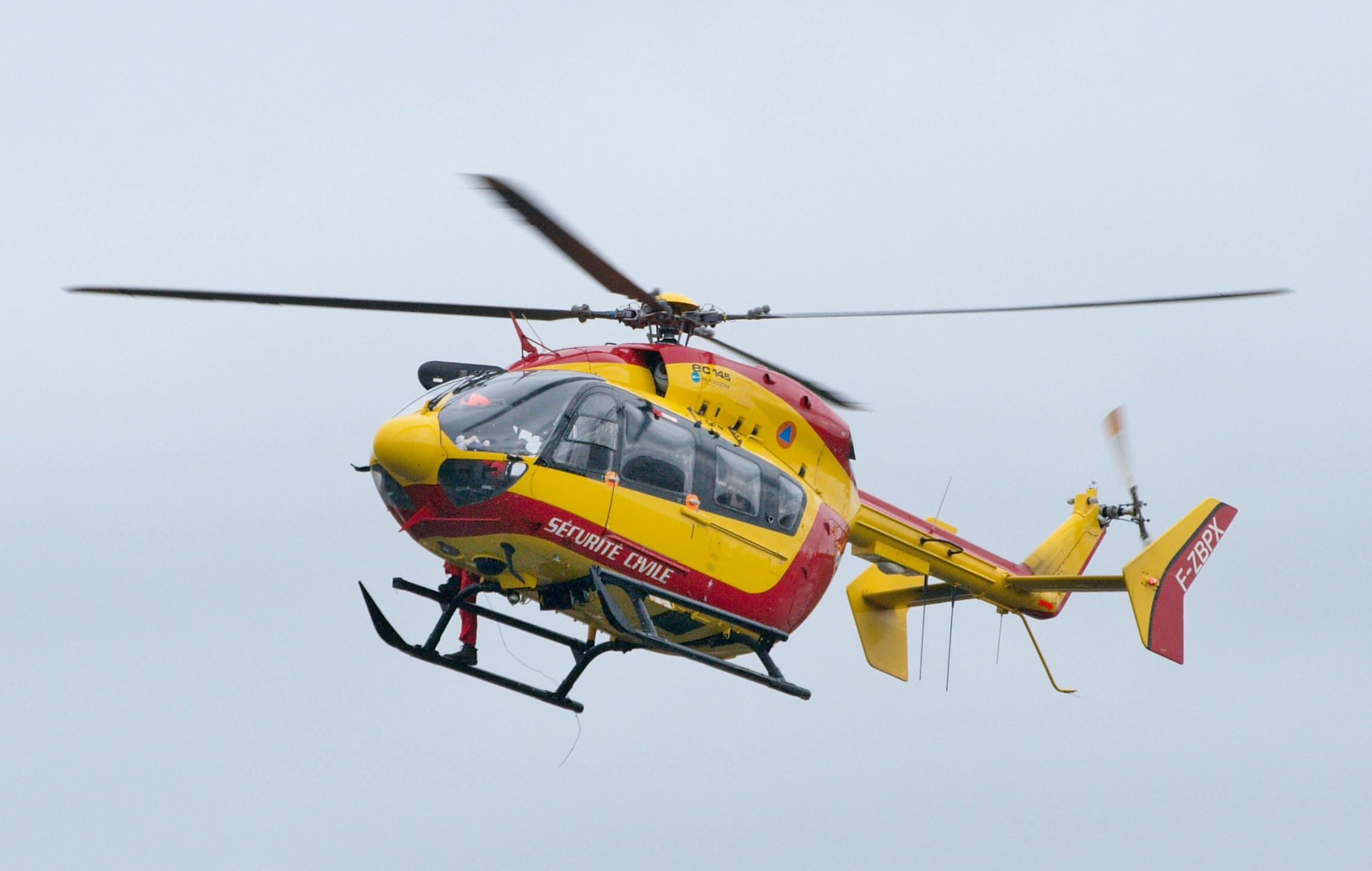
A Sécurité Civile EC145 helicopter conducts rescues operations for the French Minister of the Interior

Sequence image of mountain take-off by an Agusta A109 SP Grand "Da Vinci" helicopter from Rega air rescue service

Air medical services are the use of aircraft (both fixed-wing aircraft and helicopters) to provide various kinds of medical care (especially prehospital emergency medicine, paramedic service and critical care), typically to and from remote locations far away from hospitals, during outreach, critical couriers (e.g. pharmaceuticals, equipment and transplant organs), patient transfer, medical evacuation, disaster response and search and rescue operations.

== History ==
During World War I, air transport was used to provide medical evacuation from front line areas and the battlefield itself.

In 1928, in Australia, John Flynn founded the Flying Doctor Service (later the Royal Flying Doctor Service), to provide a wide range of medical services to civilians in remote areas; these included from routine consultations with travelling general practitioners, to air ambulance evacuations and other emergency medical services.

Fixed wing military air ambulances came into regular use during World War II. Helicopters became more commonly used for such purposes during the Korean and Vietnam wars.

Later, helicopters were introduced to civilian health care, especially for shorter distances, in and around large cities: transporting paramedics or specialist doctors as needed and transporting patients to hospitals, especially for major trauma cases. Fixed-wing aircraft remained in use for long-distance medical transport.

== Advantages ==
Air medical services can travel faster and operate in a wider coverage area than a land ambulance. This makes them particularly useful in sparsely populated rural areas.

Air medical services have a particular advantage for major trauma injuries. The controversial theory of the golden hour suggests that major trauma patients should be transported as quickly as possible to a specialist trauma center. Therefore, medical responders in a helicopter can provide both a higher level of care at the scene of a trauma and faster transport to a trauma center. They can also provide critical care when transporting patients from community hospitals to trauma centers. Oftentimes they carry more specialized equipment than ground ambulances, such as blood products, medication pumps, and ventilators, making them useful beyond reduction of transport and response times.

== Disadvantages ==
Air ambulance transport is expensive, and if utilised poorly is therefore not cost effective. When inappropriately deployed to a patient close to a hospital, an air ambulance may add delay to the patient reaching the hospital. In research from 1996, air ambulance services in England and Wales demonstrated no evidence of improvement in vehicle response times (i.e. time from 999 call to an ambulance vehicle being on-scene with the patient) for air ambulance attended patients compared to those attended by a land ambulance. The same review found patient did not arrive at hospital any quicker when attended by an air ambulance. When the same authors looked at health outcomes in Cornwall and London they found no evidence that the attendance of an air ambulance (HEMS) service improved survival in trauma patients.

== Indications for air transport ==
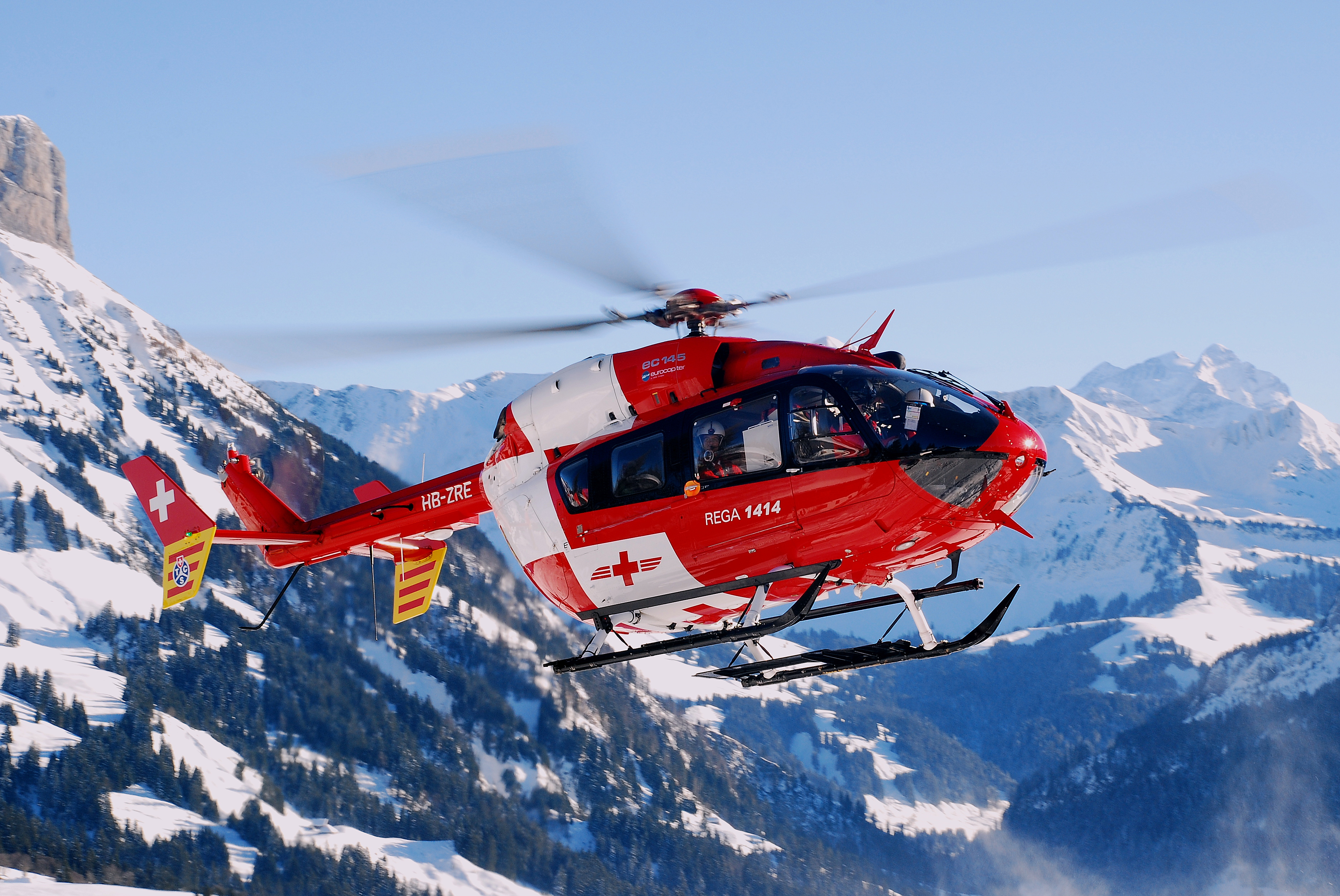
A Eurocopter EC 145 of Switzerland's Rega air rescue service

Effective use of helicopter services for trauma depends on the ground responder's ability to determine whether the patient's condition warrants air medical transport. Protocols and training must be developed to ensure appropriate triage criteria are applied. Excessively stringent criteria can prevent rapid care and transport of trauma victims; relaxed criteria can result in the patient being unnecessarily exposed to the potential dangers of dangerous weather conditions or other aviation-related risks.

Crew and patient safety is the single most important factor to be considered when deciding whether to transport a patient by helicopter. Weather, air traffic patterns, and distances (such as from the trauma scene to closest level 1 trauma centre) must also be considered. Another reason for cancelling a flight is based on the comfort of the flight crew with the flight. The general rule of safety is upon the crew, when there is one pilot and two medical crew is:

"3 to go, 1 to say 'NO'". If one flight member is not comfortable with the flight for whatever reason, the flight is cancelled.

Some have questioned the safety of air medical services. While the number of crashes may be increasing, the number of programs and use of services has also increased. Factors associated with fatal crashes of medical transport helicopters include flying at night and during bad weather, and postcrash fires.

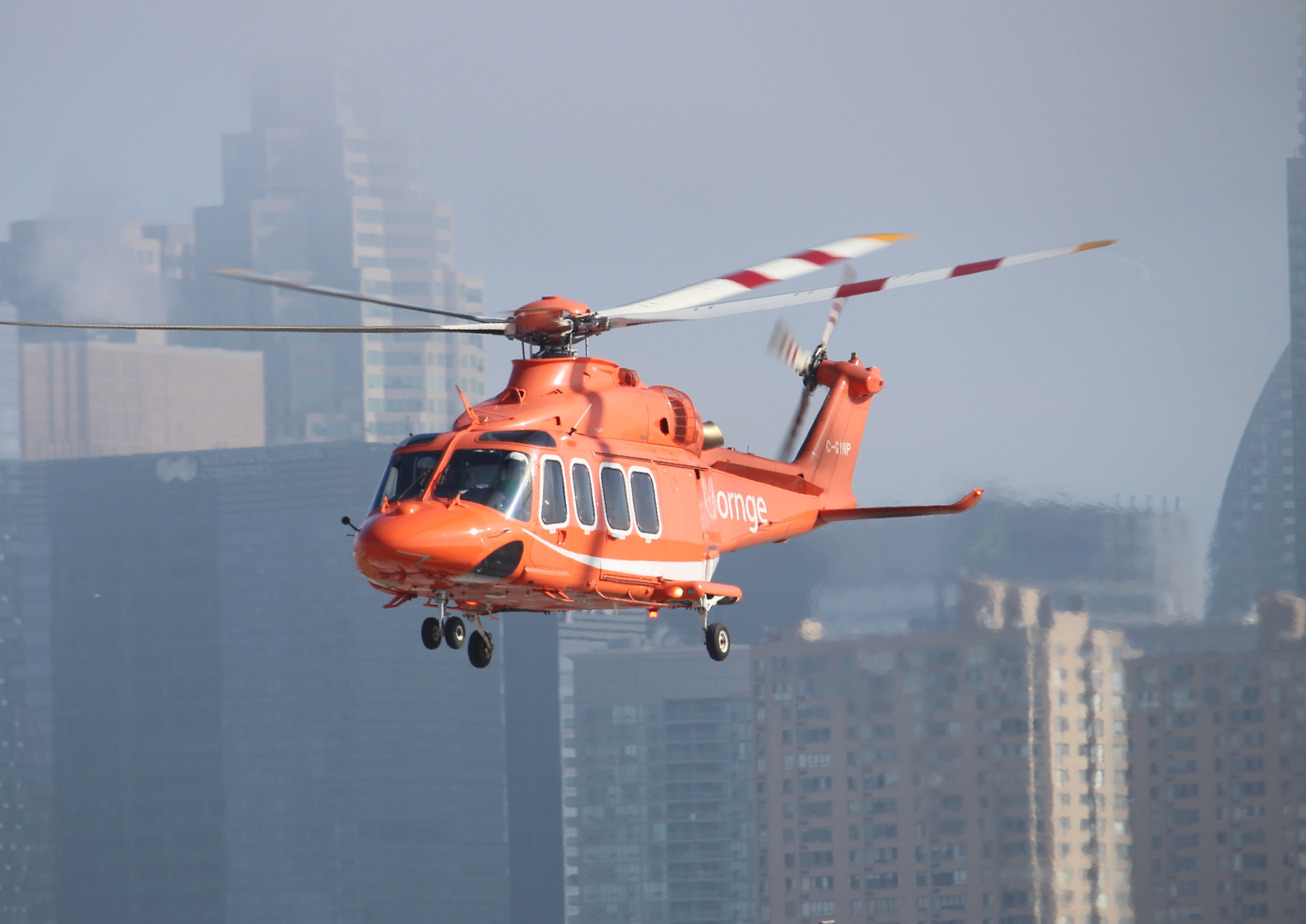
Air ambulances often employ high-visibility colour schemes, like Ontario's distinctive ORNGE helicopters. An ORNGE AgustaWestland AW139 is shown with the Toronto skyline in the background.

== Air ambulance ==
An air ambulance is a specially outfitted helicopter or fixed-wing aircraft that transports injured or sick people in a medical emergency or over distances or terrain impractical for a conventional ground ambulance. Fixed-wing aircraft are also more often used to move patients over long distances and for repatriation from foreign countries. These and related operations are called aeromedical. In some circumstances, the same aircraft may be used to search for missing or wanted people.

Like ground ambulances, air ambulances are equipped with medical equipment vital to monitoring and treating injured or ill patients. Common equipment for air ambulances includes medications, ventilators, ECGs and monitoring units, CPR equipment, and stretchers. A medically staffed and equipped air ambulance provides medical care in flight—while a non-medically equipped and staffed aircraft simply transports patients without care in flight. Military organizations and NATO refer to the former as medical evacuation (MEDEVAC) and to the latter as casualty evacuation (CASEVAC).

Air traffic control grants special treatment to air ambulance operations, much like a ground ambulance using lights and a siren, only when they are actively operating with a patient. When this happens, air ambulance aircraft take the call sign MEDEVAC (formerly LIFEGUARD) and receive priority handling in the air and on the ground.

=== History ===
==== Military ====
Most historians believe the first true medical transport mission took place during World War I when a Serbian officer was flown in a French Air Service plane from the battlefield to the hospital. French records during World War I reported that the air ambulance cut the mortality rate of injured soldiers from 60% to 10%. The first official recorded air ambulance mission was in 1917 in Turkey when a British ambulance transported a soldier who had been shot to a hospital in 45 minutes.

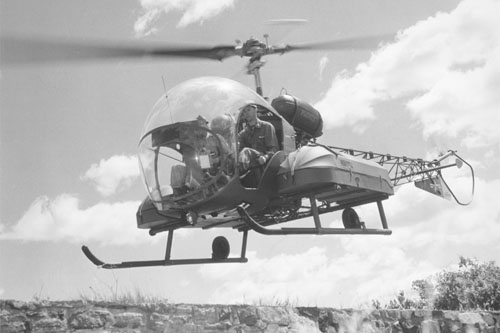
The Bell H-13 became the first dedicated MEDEVAC aircraft during the Korean War

As with many Emergency Medical Service (EMS) innovations, treating patients in flight originated in the military. The concept of using aircraft as ambulances is almost as old as powered flight itself. Although balloons were not used to evacuate wounded soldiers at the Siege of Paris in 1870, air evacuation was experimented with during the First World War.

The first recorded British ambulance flight took place in 1917 in Ottoman Empire when a soldier in the Camel Corps who had been shot in the ankle was flown to hospital in a de Havilland DH9 in 45 minutes. The same journey by land would have taken some 3 days to complete. In the 1920s several services, both official and unofficial, started up in various parts of the world. Aircraft were still primitive at the time, with limited capabilities, and the effort received mixed reviews.

Exploration of the idea continued, and France and the United Kingdom used fully organized air ambulance services during the African and Middle Eastern Colonial Wars of the 1920s. In 1920, the British, while suppressing the "Mad Mullah" in Somaliland, used an Airco DH.9A fitted out as an air ambulance. It carried a single stretcher under a fairing behind the pilot. The French evacuated over 7,000 casualties during that period. By 1936, an organized military air ambulance service evacuated wounded from the Spanish Civil War for medical treatment in Nazi Germany. This service continued during the Second World War.

The first use of medevac with helicopters was the evacuation of three British pilot combat casualties by a US Army Sikorsky R-4 in Burma during WW2, and the first dedicated use of helicopters by U.S. forces occurred during the Korean War, between 1950 and 1953. The French used light helicopters in the First Indochina War. While popularly depicted as simply removing casualties from the battlefield (which they did), helicopters in the Korean War also moved critical patients to hospital ships after initial emergency treatment in field hospitals.

Knowledge and expertise of use of air ambulances evolved parallel to the aircraft themselves. By 1969, in Vietnam, the use of specially trained medical corpsmen and helicopter air ambulances led U.S. researchers to determine that servicemen wounded in battle had better rates of survival than motorists injured on California freeways. This inspired the first experiments with the use of civilian paramedics in the world. The US military recently employed UH-60 Black Hawk helicopters to provide air ambulance service during the Iraq War to military personnel and civilians. The use of military aircraft as battlefield ambulances continues to grow and develop today in a variety of countries, as does the use of fixed-wing aircraft for long-distance travel, including repatriation of the wounded. Currently, a NATO working group is investigating unpiloted aerial vehicles (UAVs) for casualty evacuation.

==== Civilian ====
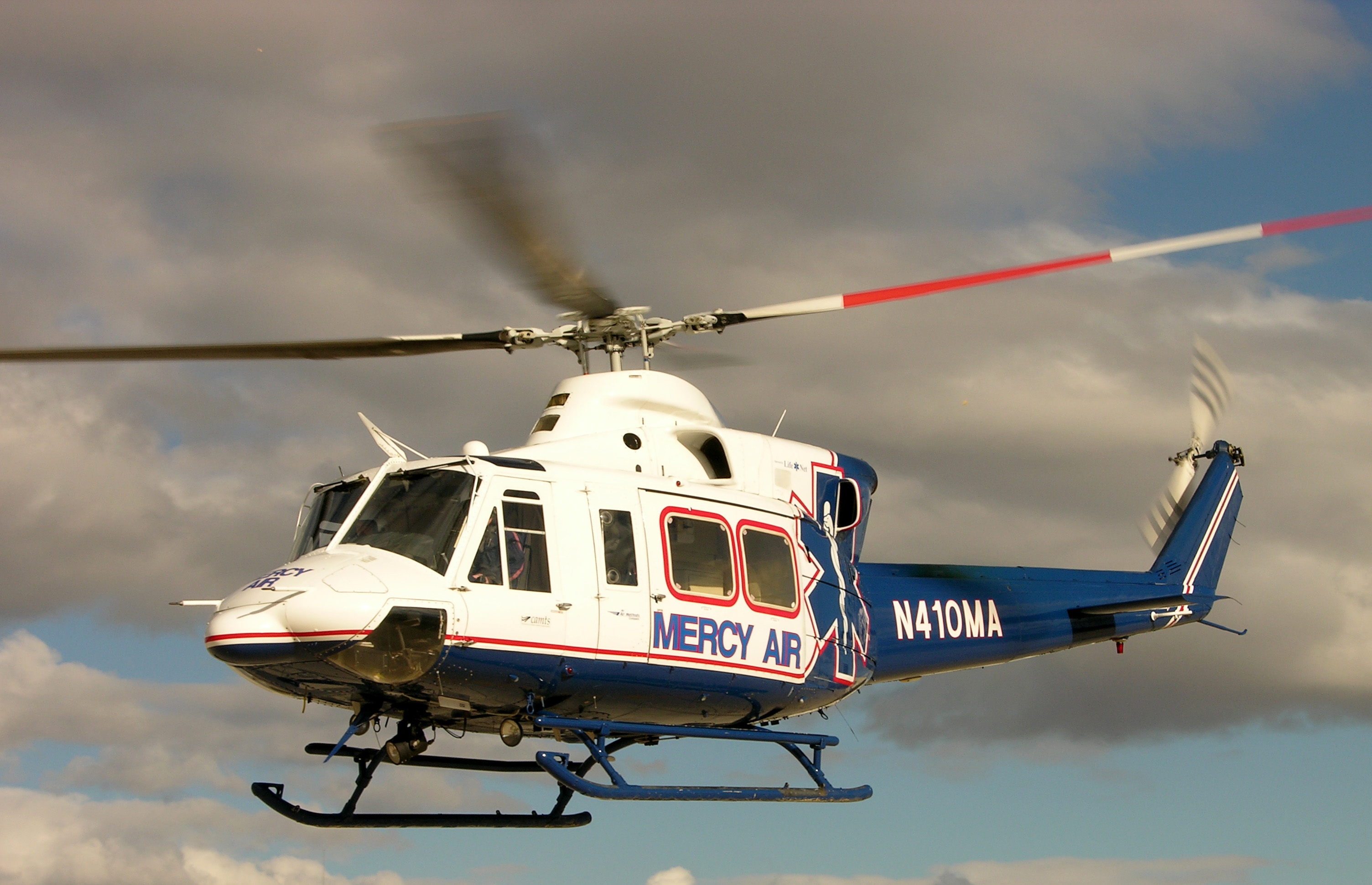
A Bell 412, departs Mojave, California

The first civilian uses of aircraft as ambulances were probably incidental. In northern Canada, Australia, and in Scandinavian countries, remote, sparsely populated settlements are often inaccessible by road for months at a time, or even year-round. In some places in Scandinavia, particularly in Norway, the primary means of transportation between communities is by boat. Early in aviation history, many of these communities began to rely on civilian "bush" pilots, who fly small aircraft and transport supplies, mail, and visiting doctors or nurses. Bush pilots probably performed the first civilian air ambulance trips, albeit on an ad hoc basis—but clearly, a need for these services existed. In the early 1920s, Sweden established a standing air ambulance system, as did Siam (Thailand). In 1928 the first formal, full-time air ambulance service was established in the Australian outback. This organization became the Royal Flying Doctor Service and still operates. In 1934, Marie Marvingt established Africa's first civil air ambulance service, in Morocco. In 1936, air ambulance services were established as part of the Highlands and Islands Medical Service to serve more remote areas of Highland Scotland. Air ambulances quickly established their usefulness in remote locations, but their role in developed areas developed more slowly. After World War II, the Saskatchewan government in Regina, Saskatchewan, Canada, established the first civilian air ambulance in North America. The Saskatchewan government had to consider remote communities and great distances in providing health care to its citizens. The Saskatchewan Air Ambulance service continues to be active as of 2023. J. Walter Schaefer founded the first air ambulance service in the U.S., in 1947, in Los Angeles. The Schaefer Air Service operated as part of Schaefer Ambulance Service.

Two research programs were implemented in the U.S. to assess the impact of medical helicopters on mortality and morbidity in the civilian arena. Project CARESOM was established in Mississippi in 1969. Three helicopters were purchased through a federal grant and located strategically in the north, central, and southern areas of the state. Upon termination of the grant, the program was considered a success and each of the three communities were given the opportunity to continue the helicopter operation. Only the one located in Hattiesburg, Mississippi did so, and it was therefore established as the first civilian air medical program in the United States. The second program, the Military Assistance to Safety and Traffic (MAST) system, was established in Fort Sam Houston in San Antonio in 1969. This was an experiment by the Department of Transportation to study the feasibility of using military helicopters to augment existing civilian emergency medical services. These programs were highly successful at establishing the need for such services. The remaining challenge was in how such services could be operated most cost-effectively. In many cases, as agencies, branches, and departments of the civilian governments began to operate aircraft for other purposes, these aircraft were frequently pressed into service to provide cost-effective air support to the evolving Emergency Medical Services.

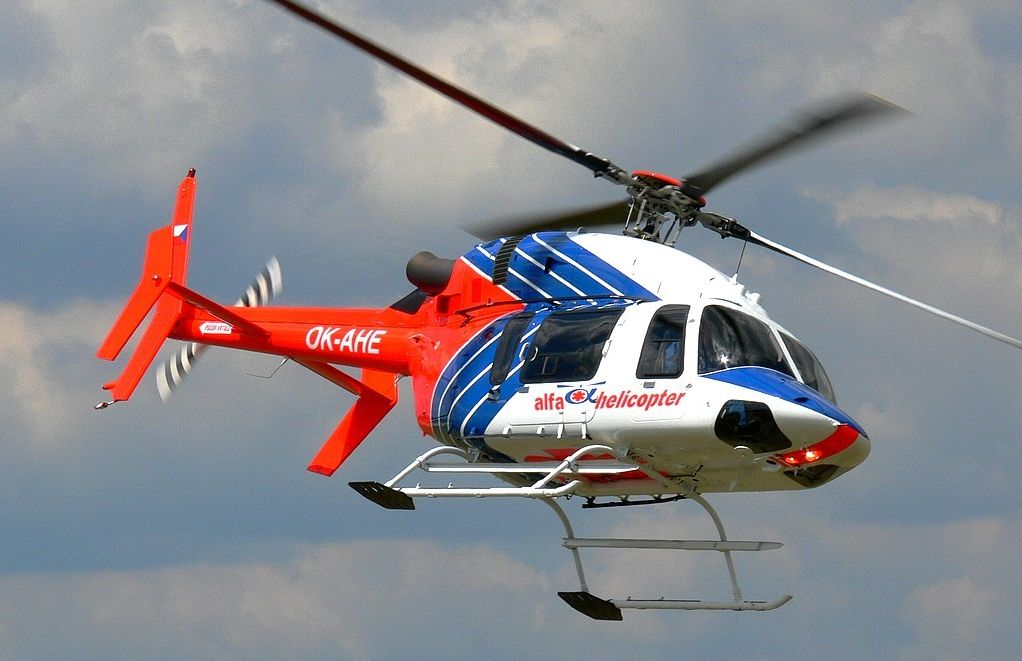
An EMS Bell 427 covering South Bohemian, Czech Republic

As the concept was proven, dedicated civilian air ambulances began to appear. On November 1, 1970, the first permanent civil air ambulance helicopter, Christoph 1, entered service at the Hospital of Harlaching, Munich, Germany. The apparent success of Christoph 1 led to a quick expansion of the concept across Germany, with Christoph 10 entering service in 1975, Christoph 20 in 1981, and Christoph 51 in 1989. As of 2007, there are about 80 helicopters named after Saint Christopher, like Christoph Europa 5 (also serving Denmark), Christoph Brandenburg or Christoph Murnau am Staffelsee. Austria adopted the German system in 1983 when Christophorus 1 entered service at Innsbruck. Also in the year 1975 Hans Burghart, one of the inventor of the civilian air rescue in Germany, presented at one Academic conference in the US the concept "Rescue Helicopters in Primary and Secondary Missions" which had impact for the aviation training at Fort Rucker, Alabama.

The first civilian, hospital-based medical helicopter program in the United States began operation in 1972. Flight For Life Colorado began with a single Alouette III helicopter, based at St. Anthony Central Hospital in Denver, Colorado. In Ontario, Canada, the air ambulance program began in 1977, and featured a paramedic-based system of care, with the presence of physicians or nurses being relatively unusual. The system, operated by the Ontario Ministry of Health, began with a single rotor-wing aircraft based in Toronto. An important difference in the Ontario program involved the emphasis of service. "On scene" calls were taken, although less commonly, and a great deal of the initial emphasis of the program was on the interfacility transfer of critical care patients. Operating today through a private contractor (ORNGE), the system operates 33 aircraft stationed at 26 bases across the province, performing both interfacility transfers and on-scene responses in support of ground-based EMS. Today, across the world, the presence of civilian air ambulances has become commonplace and is seen as a much-needed support for ground-based EMS systems. In other countries of Europe, like SFR Yugoslavia, first air ambulance appeared in the 1980s. Most of the fleet was previously used in military service. With the increased number of car accidents in 1979 on highways, the Yugoslavian government made a decision to buy new or redistribution of use of old helicopters.

=== Organization ===
Air ambulance service, sometimes called Aeromedical Evacuation or simply Medevac, is provided by a variety of different sources in different places in the world. There are a number of reasonable methods of differentiating types of air ambulance services. These include military/civilian models and services that are government-funded, fee-for-service, donated by a business enterprise, or funded by public donations. It may also be reasonable to differentiate between dedicated aircraft and those with multiple purposes and roles. Finally, it is reasonable to differentiate by the type of aircraft used, including rotary-wing, fixed-wing, or very large aircraft. The military role in civilian air ambulance operations is described in the History section. Each of the remaining models is explored separately. This information applies to air ambulance systems performing emergency service. In almost all jurisdictions, private aircraft charter companies provide non-emergency air ambulance service on a fee-for-service basis.

==== Government operated ====
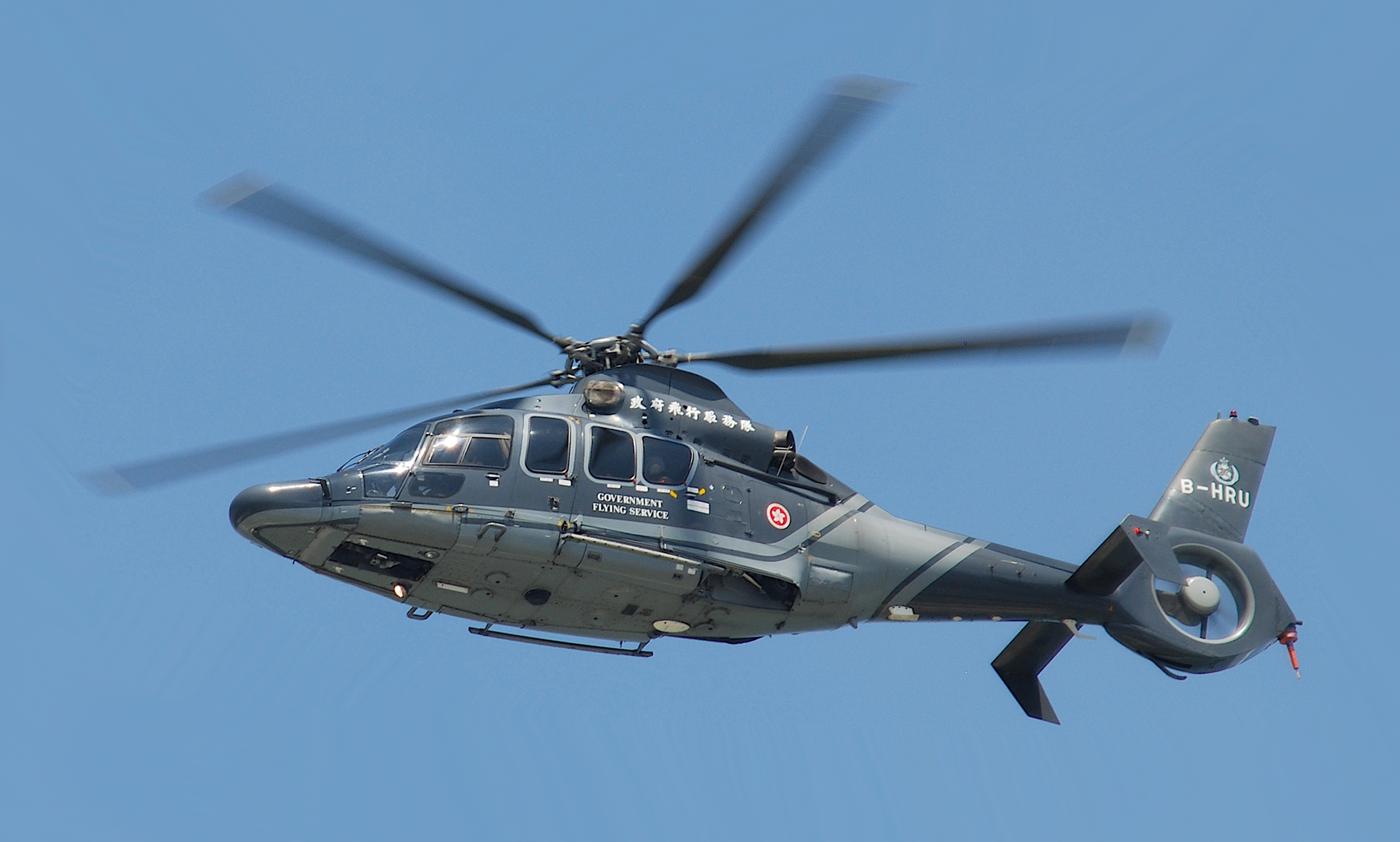
A Eurocopter EC155B of the Hong Kong Government Flying Service

In some cases, governments provide air ambulance services, either directly or via a negotiated contract with a commercial service provider, such as an aircraft charter company. Such services may focus on critical care patient transport, support ground-based EMS on scenes, or may perform a combination of these roles. In almost all cases, the government provides guidelines to hospitals and EMS systems to control operating costs—and may specify operating procedures in some level of detail to limit potential liability. However, the government almost always takes a 'hands-off' approach to the actual running of the system, relying instead on local managers with subject matter (physicians and aviation executives) expertise. Ontario's ORNGE program and the Polish Lotnicze Pogotowie Ratunkowe (LPR) are examples of this type of operating system. The Polish LPR is a national system covering the entire country and funded by the government through the Ministry of Health but run independently, there is no independent HEMS operator in Poland. In Northeast Ohio, including Cleveland, the Cuyahoga County-owned MetroHealth Medical Center uses its Metro Life Flight to transport patients to Metro's level I trauma and burn unit. There are 5 helicopters for Northeast Ohio and, in addition, Metro Life Flight has one fixed-wing aircraft.

In the United Kingdom, the Scottish Ambulance Service operates two helicopters and two fixed-wing aircraft twenty-four hours per day.

==== Multiple purpose ====
In some jurisdictions, cost is a major consideration, and the presence of dedicated air ambulances is simply not practical. In these cases, the aircraft may be operated by another government or quasi-government agency and made available to EMS for air ambulance service when required. In southern New South Wales, Australia, the helicopter that responds as an air ambulance is actually operated by the local hydroelectric utility, with the New South Wales Ambulance Service providing paramedics and doctors, as required. In some cases, local EMS provides the flight paramedic to the aircraft operator as-needed. In the case of the Los Angeles County Fire Department, the helicopters are brush fire choppers also configured as air ambulances with a paramedic provided from whichever fire department rescue unit has responded.

Sometimes the air ambulance may be run as a dual concern with another governmental body - for example, the Wiltshire Air Ambulance was run as a joint Ambulance Service and police unit until 2014.

In other cases, the paramedic staffs the aircraft full-time, but has a dual function. In the case of the Maryland State Police, for example, the flight paramedic is a serving State Trooper whose job is to act as the Observer Officer on a police helicopter when not required for medical emergencies.

==== Fee-for-service ====
In many cases, local jurisdictions do not charge for air ambulance service, particularly for emergency calls. However, the cost of providing air ambulance services is considerable and many, including government-run operations, charge for service. Organizations such as service aircraft charter companies, hospitals, and some private-for-profit EMS systems generally charge for service. Within the European Union, almost all air ambulance service is on a fee-for-service basis, except for systems that operate by private subscription. Many jurisdictions have a mix of operation types. Fee-for-service operators are generally responsible for their own organization but may have to meet government licensing requirements. Rega of Switzerland is an example of such a service.

In the United States, private air ambulance companies offer membership programs in addition to traditional insurance claims- covering the out-of-pocket costs or denials of coverage many patients experience. AirMedCare Network, Air Methods (ended membership program in 2019) and PHI are three of the largest provider member networks and cover much of the United States.

==== Donated by business ====
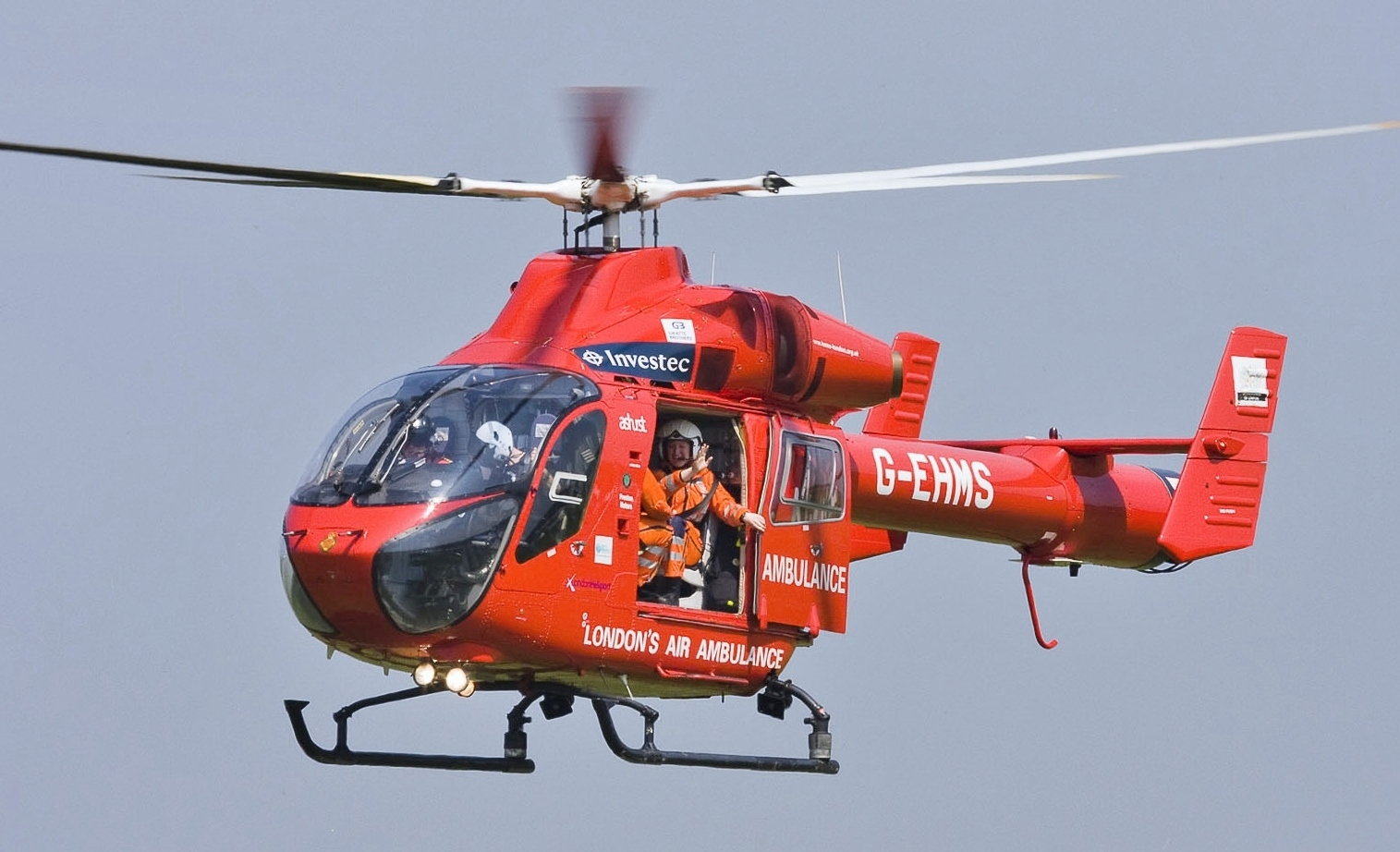
London's Air Ambulance MD 900

In some cases, a local business or even a multi-national company may choose to fund local air ambulance service as a goodwill or public relations gesture. Examples of this are common in Europe, where in London the Virgin Group previously donated to the helicopter emergency medical service London air ambulance, and in Germany and Netherlands a large number of the 'Christoph' air ambulance operations are actually funded by ADAC, Germany's largest automobile club and DRF Luftrettung. In Australia and New Zealand, many air ambulance helicopter operations are sponsored by the Westpac. In these cases, the operation may vary but is the result of a carefully negotiated agreement between government, EMS, hospitals, and the donor. In most cases, while the sponsor receives advertising exposure in exchange for funding, they take a 'hands-off' approach to daily operations, relying instead on subject matter specialists.

==== Public donations ====
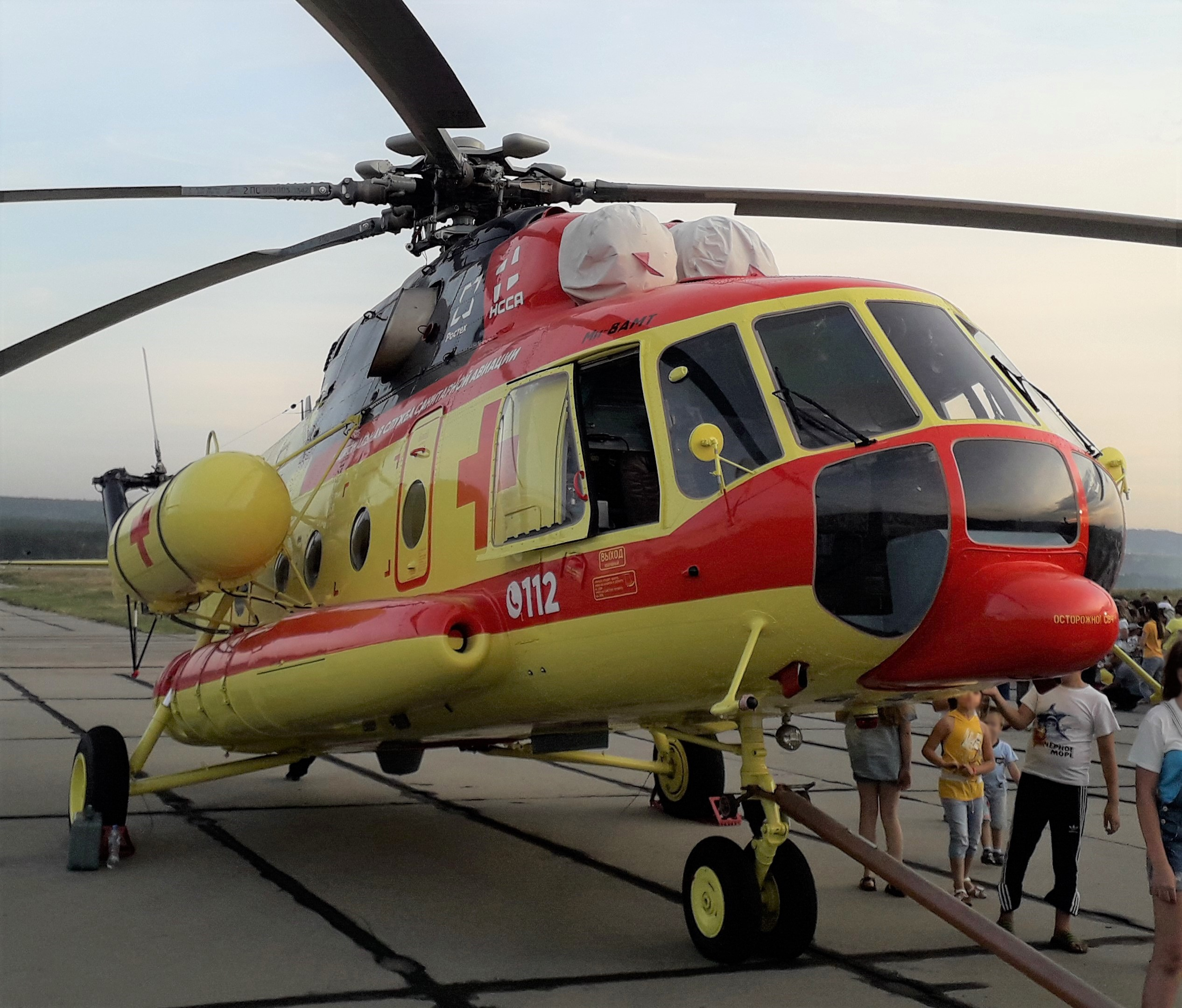
Mi-8AMT ambulance helicopter

In some cases, air ambulance services may be provided by means of voluntary charitable fundraising, as opposed to government funding, or they may receive limited government subsidy to supplement local donations. Some countries, such as the U.K., use a mix of such systems. In Scotland, the parliament has voted to fund air ambulance service directly, through the Scottish Ambulance Service. In England and Wales, however, the service is funded on a charitable basis via a number of local charities for each region covered.

Great strides have been made in the UK, with the 'Association of Air Ambulance (AAA)'. This organization is widely credited for having created the political climate that made the helicopter industry and National Health Service recognise the enormous contribution charities make to trauma care in the United Kingdom. In 2013, the AAA published the "Framework for a High Performing Air Ambulance Service" which details many of the developments from 2008 to 2013.

In recent years, the service has moved towards the physician-paramedic model of care. This has necessitated some charities commissioning clinical governance services, however many air ambulances operate under the tasking ambulances services clinical governance. The AAA now publishes Best Practice Guidance on a range of operational and clinical functions and provides a code of conduct that all full members, both ambulance services and charities must uphold.

Memorial Hermann Life Flight is a not-for-profit hospital-based critical care air ambulance service in Houston, Texas, USA. As of 2023, it operates six EC-145 twin-engine helicopters. The service relies on community support and fundraising efforts. Memorial Hermann Life Flight operates from the John S. Dunn Helistop, one of the busiest helipads in the world, with space for four helicopters.

==== "Heavy-Lift" ====
A final area of distinction is the operation of large, generally fixed-wing air ambulances. In the past, the infrequency of civilian demand for such a service confined such operations to the military, which requires them to support overseas combat operations. Military organizations capable of this type of specialized operation include the United States Air Force, the German Luftwaffe, and the British Royal Air Force. The Swedish National Air Medevac - SNAM is an exception to the military only rule where the system is owned by the Swedish Civil Contingencies Agency Myndigheten för samhällsskydd och beredskap and the 737-800 aircraft is provided under contract when so required by Scandinavian Airlines. Each operates aircraft staffed by physicians, nurses, and corpsmen/technicians, and each can provide long-distance transport with full medical support to dozens of patients simultaneously.

However, in recent years, exceptions to the "military-only" rule have grown with the need to quickly transport patients to facilities that provide higher levels of care or to repatriate individuals. Air medical companies use both large and small fixed-wing aircraft configured to provide levels of care that can be found in trauma centres for individuals who subscribe to their own health insurance or affiliated travel insurance and protection plans.

=== Standards ===
External videos
- EMS helicopter operation in Zhukovsky, Russia
- Ansat-SK flight on 26 August 2023, captain Irina Dolinina, Lenin Square helipad

==== Aircraft and flight crews ====
In most jurisdictions, air ambulance pilots must have a great deal of experience in piloting their aircraft because the conditions of air ambulance flights are often more challenging than regular non-emergency flight services. After a spike in air ambulance crashes in the United States in the 1990s, the U.S. government and the Commission on Air Medical Transportation Systems (CAMTS) stepped up the accreditation and air ambulance flight requirements, ensuring that all pilots, personnel, and aircraft meet much higher standards than previously required. The resulting CAMTS accreditation, which applies only in the United States, includes the requirement for an air ambulance company to own and operate its own aircraft. Some air ambulance companies, realizing it is virtually impossible to have the correct medicalized aircraft for every mission, instead charter aircraft based on the mission-specific requirements.

While in principle CAMTS accreditation is voluntary, a number of government jurisdictions require companies providing medical transportation services to have CAMTS accreditation to be licensed to operate. This is an increasing trend as state health services agencies address the issues surrounding the safety of emergency medical services flights. Some examples are the states of Colorado, New Jersey, New Mexico, Utah, and Washington. According to the rationale used to justify the state of Washington's adoption of the accreditation requirements, requiring accreditation of air ambulance services provides assurance that the service meets national public safety standards. The accreditation is done by professionals who are qualified to determine air ambulance safety. In addition, compliance with accreditation standards is checked on a continual basis by the accrediting organization. Accreditation standards are periodically revised to reflect the dynamic, changing environment of medical transport, with considerable input from all disciplines of the medical profession.

Other U.S. states require either CAMTS accreditation or a demonstrated equivalent, such as Rhode Island, and Texas, which has adopted CAMTS' Accreditation Standards (Sixth Edition, October 2004) as its own. In Texas, an operator not wishing to become CAMTS accredited must submit to an equivalent survey by state auditors who are CAMTS-trained. Virginia and Oklahoma have also adopted CAMTS accreditation standards as their state licensing standards. While the original intent of CAMTS was to provide an American standard, air ambulance services in a number of other countries, including three in Canada and one in South Africa, have voluntarily submitted themselves to CAMTS accreditation.

In the UK, the AAA has a Code of Conduct that binds one of the most regulated areas of operation together. It brings the Fundraising Standards Board, CAA / EASA and the CQC together ensuring fundraising, air and clinical operations are in line with national regulation and best practice. The code goes further with an expectation of mutual support and working within its policy and best practice guides.

==== Medical control ====
The nature of the air operation frequently determines the type of medical control required. In most cases, an air ambulance staffer is considerably more skilled than a typical paramedic, so medical control permits them to exercise more medical decision-making latitude. Assessment skills tend to be considerably higher, and, particularly on inter-facility transfers, permit the inclusion of functions such as reading x-rays and interpretation of lab results. This allows for planning, consultation with supervising physicians, and issuing contingency orders in case they are required during flight. Some systems operate almost entirely off-line, using protocols for almost all procedures and only resorting to on-line medical control when protocols have been exhausted. Some air ambulance operations have full-time, on-site medical directors with pertinent backgrounds (e.g., emergency medicine); others have medical directors who are only available by pager. For those systems operating on the Franco-German model, the physician is almost always physically present, and medical control is not an issue.

==== Equipment and interiors ====
Most aircraft used as air ambulances, with the exception of charter aircraft and some military aircraft, are equipped for advanced life support and have interiors that reflect this. The challenges in most air ambulance operations, particularly those involving helicopters, are the high ambient noise levels and limited amounts of working space, both of which create significant issues for the provision of ongoing care. While equipment tends to be high-level and very conveniently grouped, it may not be possible to perform some assessment procedures, such as chest auscultation, while in flight. In some types of aircraft, the aircraft's design means that the entire patient is not physically accessible in flight. Additional issues occur with respect to pressurization of the aircraft. Not all aircraft used as air ambulances in all jurisdictions have pressurized cabins and those that do typically tend to be pressurized to only 10,000 feet above sea level. These pressure changes require advanced knowledge by flight staff with respect to the specifics of aviation medicine, including changes in physiology and the behaviour of gases.

There are a large variety of helicopter makes that are used for the civilian HEMS models. The commonly used types are the Bell 206, 407, and 429, Eurocopter AS350, BK117, EC130, EC135, EC145, and the Agusta Westland 109, 169 & 139, MD Explorer and Sikorsky S-76. Fixed-wing aircraft varieties commonly include the Learjet 35 and 36, Learjet 31, King Air 90, King Air 200, Pilatus PC-12 & PC-24, and Piper Cheyenne. Due to the configuration of the medical crew and patient compartments, these aircraft are normally configured to only transport one patient but some can be configured to transport two patients if so needed. Additionally, helicopters have stricter weather minimums that they can operate in and commonly do not fly at altitudes over 10,000 feet above sea level.

==== Challenges ====
Beginning in the 1990s, the number of air ambulance crashes in the United States, mostly involving helicopters, began to climb. By 2005, this number had reached a record high. Crash rates from 2000 to 2005 more than doubled the previous five year's rates. To some extent, these numbers had been deemed acceptable, as it was understood that the very nature of air ambulance operations meant that, because a life was at stake, air ambulances would often operate on the very edge of their safety envelopes, going on missions in conditions where no other civilian pilot would fly. As a result, nearly fifty percent of all EMS personnel deaths in the United States occur in air ambulance crashes. In 2006, the United States National Transportation Safety Board (NTSB) concluded that many air ambulances crashes were avoidable, eventually leading to the improvement of government standards and CAMTS accreditation.

==== Cost-effectiveness ====
Whilst some air ambulances do have effective methods of funding, in England, they remain almost entirely charity funded, as improved cost-benefit ratios are generally achieved with land-based attendance and transfers. Health outcomes, for example from London's Helicopter Emergency Medical Service, remain uncertain.

==== Patient survival versus ground ambulance ====
Although cost-effectiveness may be a consideration in some contexts, in the United States, the primary measure of effectiveness is patient outcomes. Improvements in ground ambulance prehospital care have created uncertainty as to whether helicopter emergency medical services transport is associated with better patient outcomes compared with ground transportation. A U.S. study using 2014 data found that after adjusting for age, Injury Severity Score, and gender, trauma patients who were transferred by helicopter were 57.0% less likely to die than those transferred by ground ambulance (95% CI 0.41 to 0.44, p<0.0001). A retrospective review study reached a similar conclusion: "Patients transported by helicopter to an urban trauma centre ... had improved survival than those arriving by other means of transport." Patient survival is not the only possible measure of patient outcome. In the case of stroke patients, for instance, various outcome measures could be used.

==== Dispatch of air medical services versus ground ambulance ====
There are many considerations in deciding whether to dispatch air medical services. Availability, distance and flight conditions are primary considerations. Even when available, an air ambulance is not always faster than a ground ambulance. Ground ambulances are more numerous and more ubiquitous, so will often be closer to the scene. Ground ambulances can depart their base almost immediately, while air medical services must complete preflight routines prior to departure. A nearby suitable landing site may not be available due to trees, wires, etc. Air medical services tend to have an advantage where ground access routes to the hospital are congested and for locations more distant from hospitals. In some situations, it may be desirable to dispatch a ground ambulance that can arrive on the scene first to provide immediate patient care, and an air ambulance to transport the patient(s) to a trauma center. It also should be borne in mind that faster may not always be better. In the context of interhospital transport, it is sometimes better to wait for air medical services with a specialized team to transport a patient even though a local land ambulance and an ad hoc local medical team may be able to transfer a patient from a remote hospital to definitive care faster than air ambulance. In the United States, insurance coverage may be a factor. For example, the Coverage Policy Manual for Arkansas Blue Cross BlueShield, a not-for-profit mutual insurance company, specifies the circumstances in which costs for air medical services are covered.

== Personnel ==
The medical personnel of a helicopter ambulance has historically been a Physician/Nurse combination, Paramedic/Nurse, or a Nurse/Nurse combination. The need for a Physician/Nurse combination has diminished with more protocol and evidence-based applications for care by nurses and other clinicians and so the inclusion of respiratory therapists in all modes of air transport is becoming more prominent.

=== Retrieval doctor/physician ===
Retrieval doctor/physician: Criteria for working as a medical doctor (known as "physician" in the USA) in aeromedical services depends on the jurisdiction. In Australia, where aeromedical retrieval medicine is a well-established medical field, retrieval doctors must be experienced in a critical care specialty (i.e. anaesthesia, emergency medicine, intensive care medicine) as fully qualified specialists; specialty registrars in advanced stages of training; or general practitioners (i.e. family physicians) with broad experience in critical care and obstetrics. In the UK doctors working in HEMs are usually experienced in anaesthesia, emergency medicine, acute medicine or intensive care medicine. Some general practitioners also work for air ambulances. A formal training programme for pre-hospital emergency medicine (PHEM) in the UK now aims to produce formal PHEM consultants who have underdone specific training in working in pre-hospital care and transfer medicine.

=== Flight paramedic ===
Flight paramedic: A licensed paramedic with additional training as a certified flight paramedic (FP-C) or a master's degree. The flight paramedic is usually highly trained with at least five years of autonomous clinical experience in high acuity environments of both pre-hospital emergency medicine and critical care transport. Flight paramedics in the United States may be certified as a FP-C or a CCEMT-P.

=== Flight nurse ===
Flight nurse: a nurse specialized in patient transport in the aviation environment. The flight nurse is a member of an aeromedical evacuation crew on helicopters and airplanes, providing in-flight management and care for all types of patients. Other responsibilities may also include planning and preparing for aeromedical evacuation missions and preparing a patient care plan to facilitate patient care, comfort and safety. Flight nurses may obtain certification in Emergency Nursing (CEN), Flight Nursing (CFRN) or Critical Care (CCRN).

==== Civilian flight nurses ====
Civilian flight nurses may work for hospitals, federal, state, and local governments, private medical evacuation firms, fire departments or other agencies. They have training and medical direction that allows them to operate with a broader scope of practice and more autonomy than many other nurses. Some states require that flight nurses must also have paramedic or EMT certification to respond to pre-hospital scenes.

==== Hospital flight nurses ====
The military flight nurse performs as a member of the aeromedical evacuation crew, and functions as the senior medical member of the aeromedical evacuation team on Continental United States (CONUS), intra-theater and inter-theater flights - providing for in-flight management and nursing care for all types of patients. Other responsibilities include planning and preparing for aeromedical evacuation missions and preparing a patient positioning plan to facilitate patient care, comfort and safety.

Flight nurses evaluate individual patient's in-flight needs and request appropriate medications, supplies and equipment, providing continuing nursing care from originating to destination facility. They act as liaison between medical and operational aircrews and support personnel to promote patient comfort and to expedite the mission, and also initiate emergency treatment for in-flight medical emergencies.

=== Transport respiratory practitioner ===
A transport therapist is a highly trained respiratory practitioner (also called a respiratory therapist), typically utilized in long-distance transport situations, though able to provide care during shorter transfer. Transport therapists may obtain Adult Critical Care Specialist (ACCS), Neonatal Transport Specialist (NPT) and Neonatal Pediatric Specialist (NPS) certifications from the National Board for Respiratory Care.

== Associations and organizations ==
- Aerospace Medical Association: an umbrella group providing a forum for many different disciplines to come together and share their expertise for the benefit of all persons involved in air and space travel.
- Association of Air Medical Services: a non-profit 501C (6) trade association.

National or local organizations specializing in aeromedicine:

- British Columbia Ambulance Service, Airevac Program
- Royal Flying Doctor Service (Australia)

== See also ==
- Air ambulances in Canada
- Air ambulance services in Greece
- Air ambulances in Poland
- Air ambulances in the United Kingdom
- Air ambulances in the United States
- CareFlight
- Commission on Accreditation of Medical Transport Systems
- Emergency Medical Retrieval Service
- Medical escort
- Norsk Luftambulanse
- What Could Possibly Go Wrong? (book)
- Westpac Life Saver Rescue Helicopter Service
