= Air ambulance services in Greece =

Air ambulance in Greece is air ambulance services provided by government agencies including the Hellenic Air Force or by private-sector companies.

The aircraft used by HAF for medical transportation are:

- Beechcraft King Air 350ER
- Agusta A109 helicopter
- Bell 212 helicopter

The fixed-wing aircraft and the helicopters of the Hellenic Air Force are ready 24 hours / 365 days a year and are called to transport from remote or hard to reach locations, patients or injured persons that need direct medical attention. The flights are coordinated in collaboration with the National Centre of Emergency Help (EKAB) and the Ministry of Health. During these missions, medical personnel are also on board.

The National Centre of Emergency Help (EKAB) also provides air ambulance services by means of other aircraft.

- UH-1H Hellenic Army helicopter
- CH-47D Chinook Hellenic Army helicopter
- ΑΒ-212 (Bell 212) Hellenic Navy helicopter
- Sikorsky SH-60 Seahawk Hellenic Navy helicopter

== Private-sector companies ==
Private-sector companies that provide or have provided air medical transportation and medical escort of patients via means of air transport, air ambulance fixed and rotary wing or commercial scheduled flights include Gamma Air Medical Ltd, which was founded in 1997.

Private-sector companies such as Global Air Ambulance and US Air Ambulance both provide air medical repatriation services to and from Greece. Greek citizens who are abroad and in need of medical transport back to Greece can be moved by air ambulance or, in less critical situations, air medical escort.
