= What Could Possibly Go Wrong? (book) =

Book by Tony Bleetman

You Can't Park There!
- First edition
- Author: Tony Bleetman PhD FRCSEd FCEM DipIMC RCSEd
- Original title: You Can't Park There!
- Language: English
- Subject: Autobiography / Memoir
- Published: 2012 (Random House / Ebury) and 2019 (Penguin Books)
- Publication place: United Kingdom
- Media type: Paperback, Amazon Kindle
- Pages: 320 Original cover/title: You Can't Park There! Second issue cover/title: Confessions Of An; Air Ambulance Doctor
- ISBN: 978-0091947262

What Could Possibly Go Wrong?: The Highs and Lows of an Air Ambulance Doctor (previously You Can't Park There!) is a behind-the-scenes account of Dr Tony Bleetman's life on board an air ambulance. It is his memoir of service and experiences as a medic on board one of Britain's Helicopter Emergency Medical Service (HEMS), and was published by the Random House imprint Ebury in 2012.

It covers the setting up of the first dedicated air ambulance service outside of the pioneering Cornwall Air Ambulance and the London Air Ambulance (LAA), and features the subsequent dramas and exploits of Bleetman and his fellow HEMS Heli-Med colleagues flying in an Agusta 109E.

The publisher's synopsis for the book describes it in the following way: "Drug addicts, lorry crashes, open-heart surgery, stab wounds, headless chickens, mating llamas, and strip routines - it's all in a day's work for emergency doctor Tony Bleetman and his team. Whether they are landing in the middle of the M1 or at a maximum security jail, Tony and his crew Helimed 999 are the first on the scene in the most critical of emergencies."

== Paperback version ==
The revised paperback version of the book was issued in 2013 with a different cover image and the new title of Confessions Of An Air Ambulance Doctor.

== Themes ==
Alongside Bleetman's personal stories of life and death encountered whilst working as a flying doctor on a busy air ambulance service, You Can't Park There! has a central theme regarding the emergence of a new way of utilising air ambulances. Bleetman writes about how traditionally they were predominantly used to simply transport patients to hospital with little medical intervention - that was until the London Air Ambulance pioneered the idea of putting trauma doctors on board the aircraft, so bringing hospital care directly to the patient rather than just taking the patient to hospital. As the author says in the chapter Are You Bleetman?: "This changed everything. Their rationale was that advanced skills can make a difference to trauma victims provided you get the right doctor to the scene in time."

Bleetman goes on to describe helping set up a doctor-led air ambulance service operating out of the hospital at which he worked; and how this Heli-med service became not only the first unit outside London to put doctors in the air, but also to establish a first in the country: "Hearing that [our] Heli-med was going to be this kind of doctor-led service was really exciting. I loved flying. I loved emergency medicine. Combining the two was irresistible. But to also learn that we would be the country's first all-emergency HEMS unit was a dream come true."

== National Life Saver Award ==
The chapter Fighting Fire with Fire covers an accident/rescue by the Heli-Med team where Dr Bleetman and his paramedic colleague Brian Dwyer saved the life of critically injured car crash victim who was trapped in the wreckage of her vehicle. Bleetman and Dwyer smashed the rear window of the car to anaesthetise the patient and ventilate her artificially; Bleetman eventually having to cut open her chest to relieve pressure and re-inflate her collapsed lung – a procedure normally only performed in hospital.

Once she had been cut out of the wreck, the severely injured patient then 'died' three times in the air ambulance whilst on the way to hospital, but each time she was revived by Bleetman. After 32 hours of surgery at the hospital, and a long recovery, she eventually survived her injuries.

The incident led to Bleetman and Dwyer being awarded National Life Saver Awards in 2006 and being invited to No. 10 Downing Street to meet the then-Prime Minister, Tony Blair. "[Bleetman, Dwyer] Saved the life of a woman involved in a serious car accident, carrying out emergency hospital-level surgery within the confines of a trapped car for more than an hour." - Ambulance Today.

The rescue was later depicted in a filmed reconstruction for the Channel 5 television series Britain’s Bravest, presented by Dermot Murnaghan.

"Within 11 minutes of the crash, a[n] Air Ambulance had reached the site. The helicopter crew comprised Dr Anthony Bleetman, a hospital consultant and air ambulance volunteer; paramedic Brian Dwyer; and pilot. They landed the helicopter in a field close to the crash and quickly assessed the situation. [The victim]’s car was virtually wrapped around the tree and she was clearly seriously injured; unconscious and struggling to breathe, she was bleeding profusely from a head wound and her legs were trapped in the wreckage. The air ambulance team realised that [she] would need immediate treatment if she was to survive." - Britain's Bravest

Of the award and the meeting with Tony Blair, Bleetman later commented: "I was a bit embarrassed about it all. I've done lots of similar jobs and we do everything we can each time. This was difficult because there was barely a fingernail's space to work with and the wreckage was everywhere. I suppose we pulled out all the stops, but it's our job."

== M1 motorway landing ==
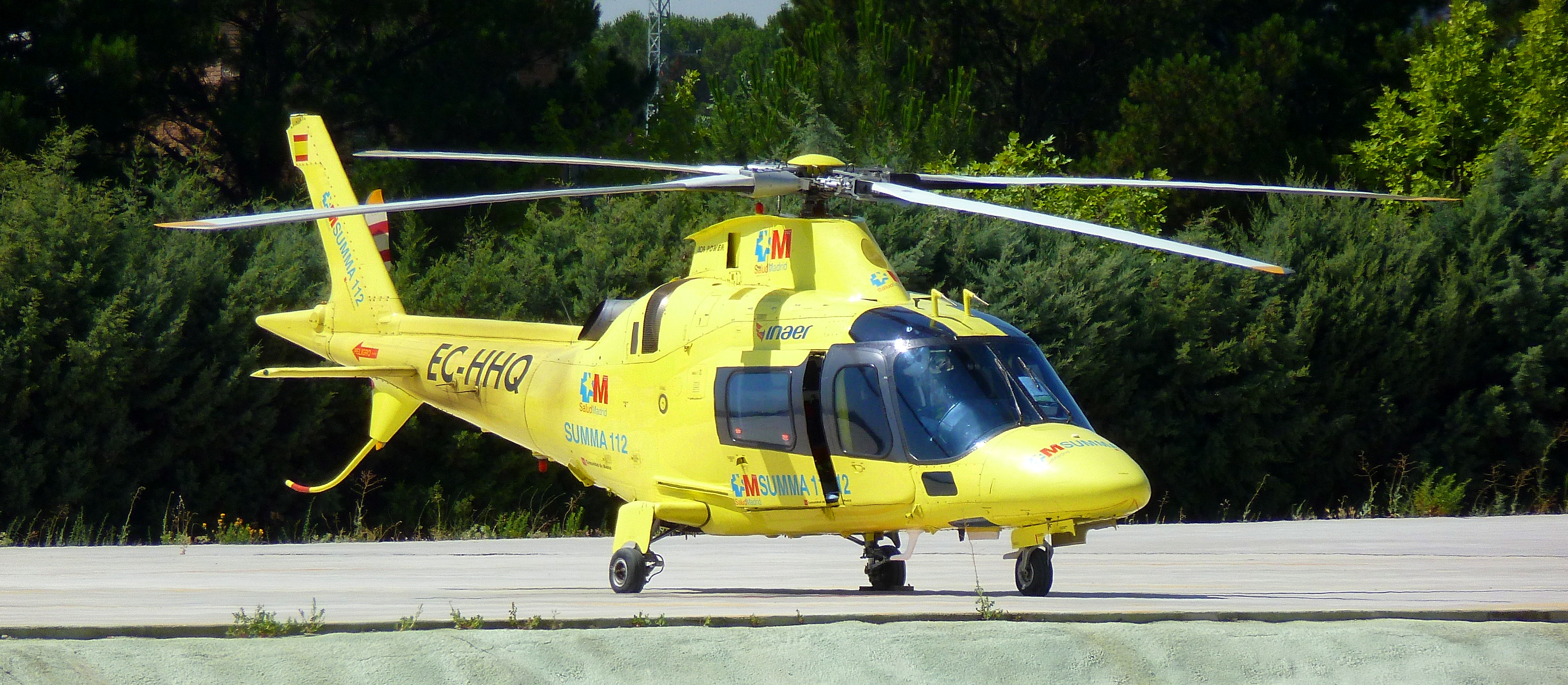
An Agusta 109E as used by HEMS (Helicopter Emergency Medical Service)

A chapter of You Can't Park There! describes Bleetman's Heli-Med team making a landing on a busy carriageway of the M1 motorway to attend a multiple vehicle accident scene. The dramatic manoeuvre, in which the Heli-med crew's Agusta helicopter taxis between the motorway traffic, was captured on film by a stationary motorist in the halted vehicles on the opposite carriageway of the M1. The book recounts what was thought at the time to be the controversial nature of the landing because of the aircraft and vehicle proximity.
