= Commission on Accreditation of Medical Transport Systems =

Accreditation agency

The Commission on Accreditation of Medical Transport Systems (CAMTS) (pronounced cames), is an independent, non-profit agency based in Sandy Springs, South Carolina, which audits and accredits fixed-wing, rotary wing, and surface medical transport services worldwide to a set of industry-established criteria. CAMTS has accredited 182 medical transport programs worldwide as of February, 2017.

== Background ==
CAMTS first enacted its Accreditation Standards in 1991, which were developed by its member organizations as well as with extensive public comment and input. The Standards are the core element to the CAMTS program, which declares that the highest priorities for medical transport services companies are "patient care and safety of the transport environment". CAMTS accreditation, once granted, lasts for three years, at which time it can be renewed by being reaudited. Preparation for initial accreditation generally takes from four to six months, as the process examines all aspects of operations, from management to medical protocols to flight operations.

== CAMTS' member organizations ==
CAMTS is an "organization of organizations" composed of 22 member organizations, each of which has representation on the Commission's board of directors. The member organizations are:

- Aerospace Medical Association
- Air Medical Operators Association
- Air Medical Physicians Association
- Air and Surface Transport Nurses Association
- American Academy of Pediatrics
- American Association of Critical Care Nurses
- American Association of Respiratory Care
- American College of Emergency Physicians
- American College of Surgeons
- Association of Air Medical Services
- Association of Critical Care Transport
- Emergency Nurses Association
- European HEMS and Air Ambulance Committee
- International Association of Flight & Critical Care Paramedics
- International Association of Medical Transport Communications Specialists
- National Air Transportation Association
- National Association of EMS Physicians
- National Association of Neonatal Nurses
- National Association of State EMS Officials
- National EMS Pilots Association
- United States Transportation Command

== Requirement for accreditation ==
While in principle CAMTS accreditation is voluntary, a number of government jurisdictions require companies providing medical transportation services to have CAMTS accreditation in order to be licensed to operate. This is an increasing trend as state health services agencies address the issues surrounding the safety of emergency medical services flights. Some examples are the states of Colorado, New Jersey, New Mexico, Utah, Michigan and Washington. According to the rationale used to justify Washington's adopting the accreditation requirements, "Requiring accreditation of air ambulance services provides assurance that the service meets national public safety standards. The accreditation is done by professionals who are qualified to determine air ambulance safety. In addition, compliance with accreditation standards is done on a continual basis by the accrediting organization. Their accreditation standards are periodically revised to reflect the dynamic, changing environment of medical transport with considerable input from all disciplines of the medical profession."

Other states require either CAMTS accreditation or a demonstrated equivalent, such as Rhode Island and Texas, which has adopted CAMTS' Accreditation Standards (Sixth Edition, October 2004) as its own. In Texas and Maryland, an operator not wishing to become CAMTS accredited must submit to an equivalent survey by state auditors who are CAMTS-trained. An exception would be the Maryland State Police, who are not accredited. Virginia, Arizona, Missouri, and Oklahoma have also adopted CAMTS accreditation standards as their state licensing standards.

== Notable accredited programs ==
- MU Air Medical Services
- PHI Air Medical
- St. Mary's LifeFlight
- Air Evac Lifeteam
- Air Methods
- ARCH Air Medical Service
- Boston Children's Hospital Critical Care Transport Team
- Calstar
- CareFlite
- Flight for Life
- Lifestar Air Medical Services
- Memorial Hermann Life Flight
- STAT Medevac
- Shock Trauma Air Rescue Society (STARS)
- AirMed International
- Northwest MedStar
- REACH Air Medical
- Penn State Hershey Life Lion
- LVHN MedEvac
- MedCenter Air
