= Air Methods =

American privately owned helicopter operator

Air Methods Corporation
- Type: Private
- Traded as: Nasdaq: AIRM
- Industry: Air Services, Other
- Founded: 1980; 46 years ago
- Headquarters: Denver Technological Center, Greenwood Village, Colorado, United States
- Key people: Robert Hamilton (CEO); Mark Smolenski (CFO); Leo Morrissette (EVP of Operations); Chris Brady (General Counsel); Treg Manning (CCO); Stephanie Queen (SVP) of Clinical Services); Dan Downs (SVP) of Safety
- Revenue: ▲US$511 million (FY 2009)
- Operating income: ▲US$47.8 million (FY 2009)
- Net income: ▲US$29.0 million (FY 2009)
- Total assets: ▲US$424 million (FY 2009)
- Total equity: ▲US$197 million (FY 2009)
- Number of employees: 5,000
- Subsidiaries: FSS Airholdings; Rocky Mountain Holdings; Mercy Air Service; LifeNet; San Antonio AirLife; Tri-State CareFlight; Native Air
- Website: airmethods.com

Air Methods Corporation is an American privately owned helicopter operator. The air medical division provides emergency medical services to over 100,000 patients every year. It operates in 48 states with air medical as its primary business focus. Its corporate headquarters are located in the Denver Technological Center, Greenwood Village, Colorado, in the Denver metropolitan area.

The company was founded by Roy Morgan and began air medical operations in 1980. From 1991 to 2017, the company was a publicly traded company under the NASDAQ ticker "AIRM". In 2017, it was acquired by private equity firm American Securities.

In 2012, the company acquired its first helicopter tour operations, Sundance Helicopters, in Las Vegas, Nevada. A year later, Blue Hawaiian joined its tourism division. The company has more than 5,000 employees and operates a fleet of approximately 450 helicopters and fixed-wing aircraft.

== History ==
In 1980, Roy Morgan founded Air Methods after a personal experience convinced him that properly equipped and staffed air medical service helicopters were a necessity.

Air Methods purchased CJ Systems Aviation Group, a leading provider of aeromedical transport, in October 2007.

In 2011, Air Methods acquired Omniflight Helicopters, Inc., operating it as a wholly owned subsidiary. Omniflight Helicopters consisted of over 100 helicopters.

In July 2011, Air Methods (Air Methods International, Ltd.) entered into a joint venture agreement with Basari Holding, AS and Anka Aerospace & Defense, LLC to form Helistar, AS. The joint venture company is headquartered in Ankara, Turkey.

In October 2012, Air Methods opened its state-of-the-art technologically advanced training center in Aurora, Colorado. Located near the corporate office, the 14,000-square-foot facility has simulation areas, learning classrooms and office space. Also in 2012, the company diversified into helicopter tourism.

In 2016, Air Methods acquired Tri-State Care Flight.

In 2017, Air Methods was purchased by American Securities LLC.

In Apri 2023, Sundance Helicopters was acquired.

On October 24, 2023, Air Methods filed for Chapter 11 bankruptcy, blaming high interest rates and labor costs as part of its decision to file for bankruptcy. The company stated that it has plans to shed high amounts of debt, and that it would continue to operate normally during the bankruptcy process.

On December 28, 2023, Air Methods would emerge from Chapter 11 bankruptcy, successfully achieving its goal of eliminating around $1.7 billion of debt. The company stated that its assets were acquired by its lenders, releasing plans to inject $185 million into the company.

== Service models ==
Air Methods provides services through three basic programs: Community-Based Service model (CBS), Hospital-Based Service model (HBS) and Alternative-Delivery Model (ADM). Under all three programs, Air Methods transports persons requiring intensive medical care from either the scene of an accident or general care hospitals, to trauma centers or tertiary care centers. Air Methods employees provide medical care to patients en route.

== Corporate affairs ==
=== Headquarters ===
Its corporate headquarters are located in 62,124 square feet (5,771.5 m^{2}) of space in the Denver Technological Center, in Greenwood Village, Colorado, in the Denver metropolitan area.

Its corporate headquarters were previously on the property of Centennial Airport in Dove Valley CDP, Colorado, United States in the Denver metropolitan area; the headquarters used an Englewood, Colorado postal address. The headquarters moved to the current location in May 2017, one month after it was acquired by American Securities LLC.

=== Divisions and services ===
United Rotorcraft, Air Methods' aerospace division, specializes in the design and manufacture of aeromedical and aerospace technology. The tourism division comprises Sundance Helicopters, Inc. and Blue Hawaiian Helicopters, which provide helicopter tours and charter flights in the Las Vegas/Grand Canyon region and Hawaii, respectively. Air Methods’ fleet of owned, leased or maintained aircraft features over 450 helicopters and fixed-wing aircraft.

Rocky Mountain Holdings, LLC (RMH), Mercy Air Service, Inc. (Mercy Air), and LifeNet, Inc. (LifeNet) operate as wholly owned subsidiaries of Air Methods.

United Rotorcraft designs, manufactures, and installs aircraft medical interiors and other aerospace or medical transport products.

The Direct Patient Logistics (DPL) transfer center is a division of Air Methods that coordinates transfers between hospitals and referring centers. It is the center point of coordination between all parties involved in the transfer process.

AirCom is the dispatching/coordinating/and flight tracking division of Air Methods. It dispatches over 450 aircraft for Air Methods Corporation as well as dispatching and coordinating services for other agencies, including police departments, county departments, ambulance services, and other public service agencies.

Along with dispatching aircraft, Air Methods has teamed up with Community Health Systems and sister company Quorum Health Systems to allow for hospitals owned by those companies to have a transport call center that they can use for ease of access in finding an aircraft. The program allows for the hospitals to call the communications center and pass off flight requests to a specialist so that doctors, nurses, and other hospital staff can focus more on patient care. The Transport Call Center took their first call from Big Bend Hospital in Alpine, Texas on November 12, 2011. From November 2011 to January 2015, the CHS/QHC Transport Call Center was located in Nashville, Tennessee. It was then relocated to the Air Methods Communications Center in Omaha, Nebraska.

== Aircraft ==
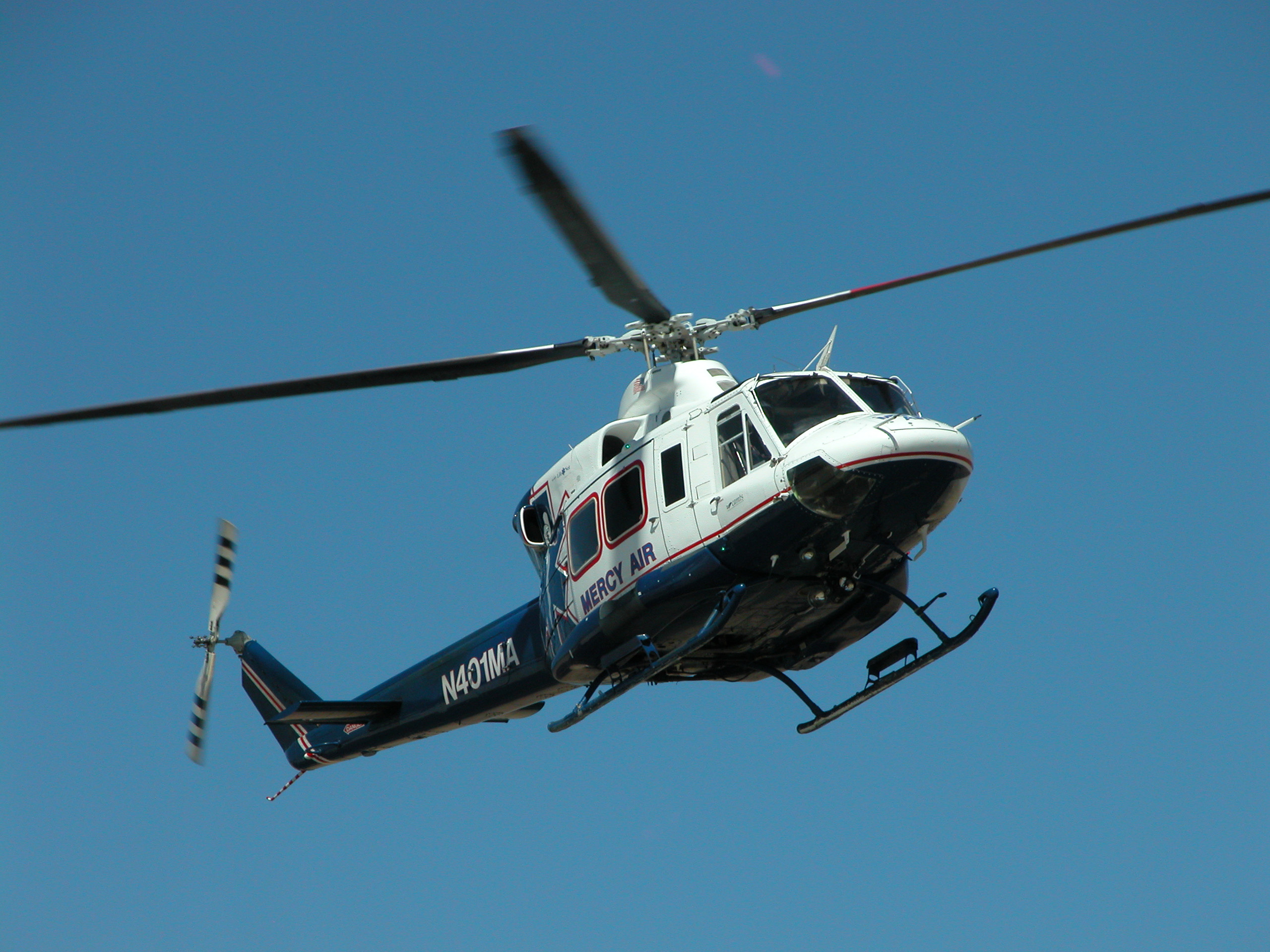
A Bell 412 operated by Mercy Air, a subsidiary of Air Methods.

Air Methods' fleet of helicopters includes:

- Eurocopter AS350 Ecureuil
- Eurocopter AS365 Dauphin
- Eurocopter EC130
- Eurocopter EC135
- Eurocopter EC145 (including MBB/Kawasaki BK 117, the previous version)
- Bell 206 JetRanger and Bell 407
- Bell 222 and Bell 430
- Bell 412
- Bell 429
- AgustaWestland AW109
- AgustaWestland AW119 Koala
- MD Helicopters MD 902

Fixed-wing craft owned and/or operated through Air Methods:

- Beechcraft King Air 100
- Beechcraft Super King Air 200
- Pilatus PC-12
- Cessna 208 Caravan
- Learjet 35

== Accidents ==
- In January 2005, an Air Methods helicopter crashed in Washington, D.C., resulting in two dead and one injured, and another crashed in Mississippi, killing one.
- On June 29, 2008, a Bell 407 medical helicopter operated by Air Methods collided with another medical helicopter in Arizona, killing all seven who were aboard both aircraft. Another Air Methods helicopter crashed in May in Wisconsin soon after taking off. Three people were killed in that accident: the pilot, flight doctor and flight nurse.
- On August 26, 2011 four people (three crew members and one patient) were killed when a LifeNet Eurocopter AS350 based at Rosecrans Airport and connected to Heartland Hospital in St. Joseph, Missouri crashed near Liberty, Missouri. Initial crash reports indicated it had run out of fuel. The helicopter had traveled 45 miles from St. Joseph to Harrison County Community Hospital in Bethany, Missouri to pick up a patient. It did not refuel before traveling another 70 miles en route to its intended destination at Liberty Hospital. It was reported to be within a mile of landing for fuel at Midwest National Air Center in Mosby, Missouri (near Liberty) when it crashed. In 2013 the NTSB received information indicating that texting may have been a contributing cause, making it the first time texting had been found to occur during a fatal air accident.
- On July 3, 2015, a Eurocopter AS350B3 medical helicopter operated by Air Methods crashed into a parking lot in Frisco, Colorado. The pilot was fatally injured, and the two flight nurses on board were seriously injured. The helicopter was destroyed by post-crash fire.
- On April 26, 2018, an Air Methods Corp Airbus Helicopters AS350B2 (N127LN), apparently operating on behalf of Ascension Wisconsin Spirit Medical Transport, was destroyed when it crashed near Hazelhurst, Wisconsin towards the end of a flight from Madison to Woodruff, Wisconsin. All three persons on board died in the crash.

== See also ==
- ARCH Air Medical Service
