= Lorraine Frazier =

Irish-born American nurse

- Born: Kells, County Meath, Ireland
- Spouse: David

Academic background
- Education: BSN, University of Oklahoma; MSN, PhD, Jane and Robert Cizik School of Nursing; ADN, Texas State University; MS, McGovern Medical School
- Thesis: Resting and reactive blood pressure as predictors of ambulatory blood pressure in older hypertensive adults (2000)

Lorraine Quinn Frazier is an Irish-American nurse. She is the dean of the Columbia University School of Nursing, having previously served in similar roles at the University of Texas Health Science Center at Houston and University of Arkansas for Medical Sciences.

== Early life and education ==
Frazier was born in Kells, County Meath, Ireland. She lived in Ireland until she was eight years old when her family relocated to Houston, Texas due to the growing political and social unrest. Frazier completed her Bachelor of Nursing degree from the University of Oklahoma and her Master's degree and PhD from the Jane and Robert Cizik School of Nursing. Following this, she enrolled at Southwest Texas State University for her Associate of Science in Nursing and second master's degree at the UTHealth McGovern Medical School.

== Career ==
Upon completing her PhD, Frazier spent two years traveling with her husband before accepting a faculty position at the University of Texas Health Science Center at Houston (UTH). In this role, she accepted a Robert Wood Johnson Foundation Executive Nurse Fellowship to "focus on expanding the role of nurses to lead change in the U.S. health care system." Throughout her tenure, she served as the first project director of TexGen Research, a joint genetics project of the University of Texas at Houston, the University of Texas M.D. Anderson Cancer Center, and Baylor College of Medicine.

She eventually left UTH in 2011 to accept a position as dean of the University of Arkansas for Medical Sciences College of Nursing, replacing Claudia Barone. Her tenure at the institution was short-lived as she returned to UTH in 2015 as the dean of UTH's School of Nursing. Frazier joined Columbia University School of Nursing as their Dean in 2018, succeeding Bobbie Berkowitz who had led the school since 2010. While serving as Dean, she was also appointed to serve on the Arnold P. Gold Foundation's board of trustees.

== Personal life ==
Frazier is married to David and has one daughter. In May 2022, Frazier was diagnosed with breast cancer.
