= Terri S. Armstrong =

American scientist

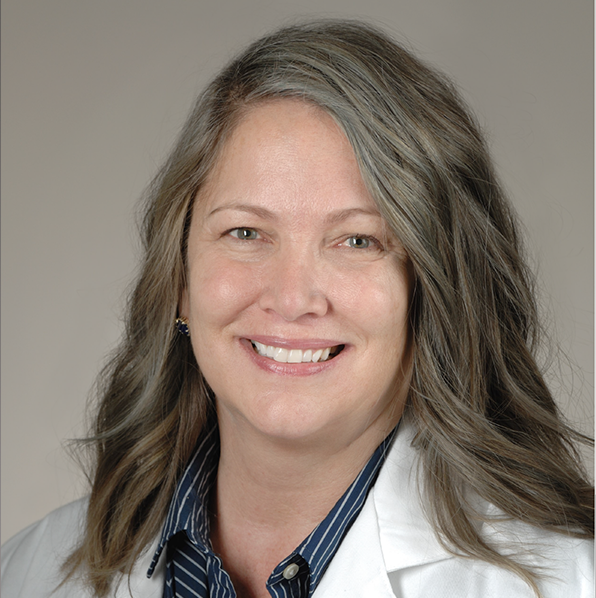
- Education: Ohio State University (M.S.); University of Texas Health Science Center at Houston (Ph.D.)
- Scientific career
- Fields: Neuro-oncology
- Workplaces: Emory University; MD Anderson Cancer Center; UTHealth School of Nursing; National Cancer Institute

Terri S. Armstrong is an American scientist and nurse practitioner. She is a senior investigator in the Center for Cancer Research Neuro-Oncology Branch of the National Cancer Institute. Armstrong held the Dunn Distinguished Professorship in Oncology Nursing at UTHealth Jane and Robert Cizik School of Nursing.

== Education ==
Armstrong obtained her master's in oncology from Ohio State University and her Ph.D. from University of Texas Health Science Center at Houston (UTHealth).

== Career ==
Armstrong has worked in the field of neuro-oncology since 1992, and has held faculty positions at Emory University, University of Texas MD Anderson Cancer Center, and the UTHealth Jane and Robert Cizik School of Nursing, where she held the school's Dunn Distinguished Professorship in Oncology Nursing. She has maintained a clinical practice in neuro-oncology as well as research faculty positions with a focus on clinical outcomes assessment and exploring clinical and biologic predictors of toxicity and symptoms. She has received research grants from philanthropy, professional associations, and was awarded an NIH R01 grant developing prediction models of toxicity. She has published 100 manuscripts in peer-reviewed journals and over 15 book chapters on the care of patients with central nervous system tumors in addition to presenting on a regional, national and international level. She is currently Vice President of the Society for Neuro-Oncology and Quality of Life representative and chair on several studies in cooperative groups including Alliance Oncology and the NRG Oncology Research Group. She is a senior investigator in the Neuro-Oncology Branch of the Center for Cancer Research in the National Cancer Institute.

Armstrong is Adult Nurse Practitioner-Board Certified (ANP-BC).

== Research ==
Armstrong's program of research focuses on three interlocking areas of research: development of measures and approaches to accurately assess symptom burden and the impact of the disease and therapy on patient outcomes; exploration of the clinical and genomic predictors of risk of symptoms and toxicity; and exploration of the underlying pathophysiology with the overarching goal of developing approaches to care and symptom management that impact outcomes. These efforts have included the development, psychometric evaluation and assessment of the utility of instruments, and use of patient reported outcomes in multicenter clinical trials. In addition, Armstrong has led multi-disciplinary teams who are evaluating both clinical and genomic predictors of toxicity and biologic underpinnings of critical symptoms with the goal to improve symptom management and patient outcomes.

== Honors ==
Armstrong is a fellow of the American Academy of Nursing and the American Association of Nurse Practitioners.
