= Jerry Wolinsky =

American scientist

Jerry S. Wolinsky is an American scientist, currently the Bartels Family and Opal C. Rankin Professor of Neurology at McGovern Medical School at the University of Texas Health Science Center at Houston (UTHealth) and an Elected Fellow of the American Association for the Advancement of Science.
