= Aballay =

Aballay may refer to:

- Alejandro Aballay, American biologist
- Roberto Aballay, an Argentine football player
- "Aballay", a 1978 short story by Antonio Di Benedetto
- Aballay (film), a 2010 Argentine film based on Di Benedetto's short story
