= James T. Willerson =

American cardiologist (1939–2020)

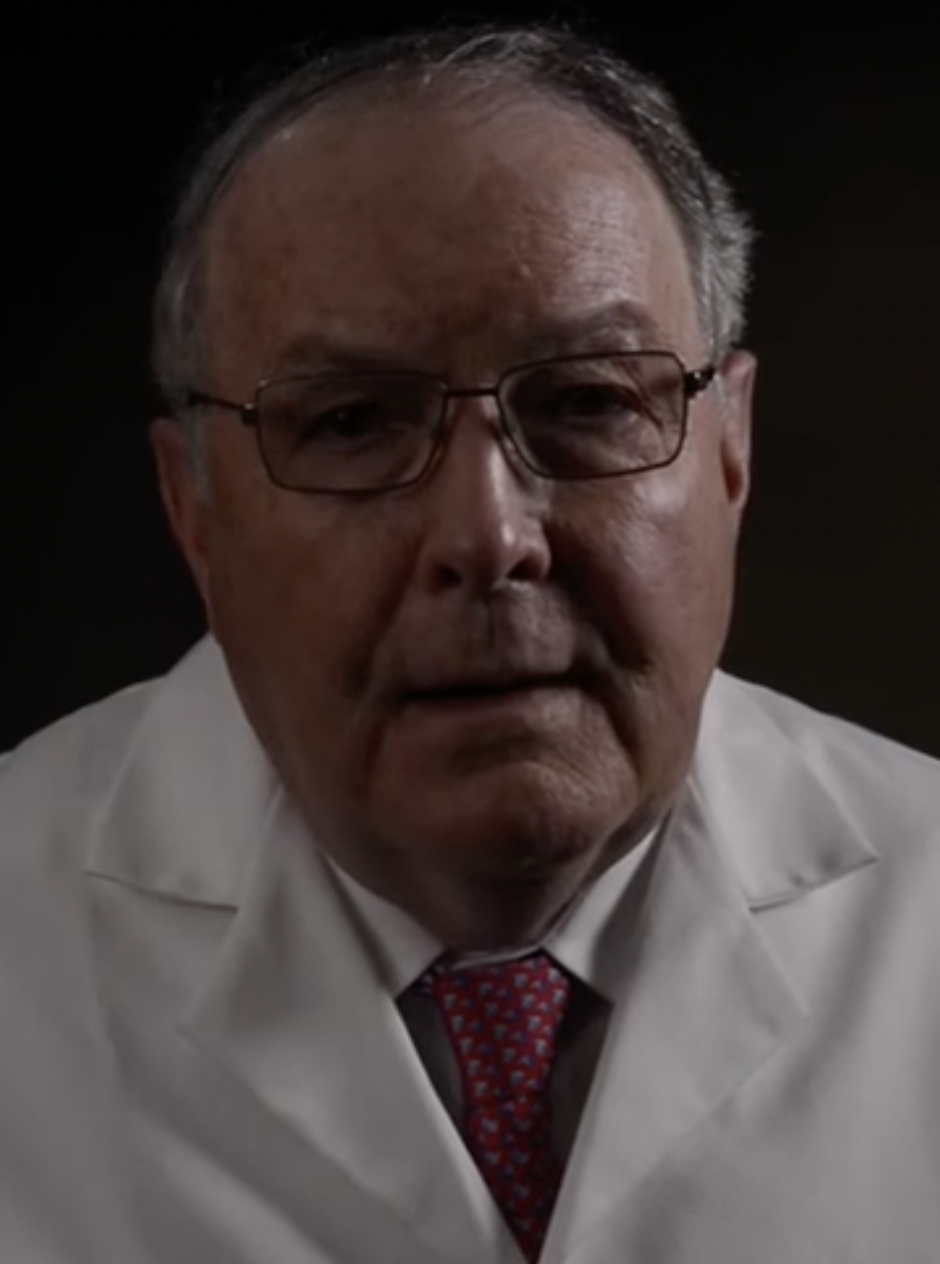
- Willerson in 2016
- Born: November 16, 1939; Lampasas, Texas
- Died: September 16, 2020 (aged 80)
- Spouse: Nancy Willerson

Academic background
- Education: BA, University of Texas at Austin; MD, Baylor College of Medicine

Academic work
- Institutions: McGovern Medical School University of Texas Health Science Center at Houston

James Thornton Willerson (November 16, 1939 – September 16, 2020) was an American cardiologist. He was the President Emeritus, Director of Cardiology Research, and Co-Director of the Cullen Cardiovascular Research Laboratories at the Texas Heart Institute. Upon moving to Houston in 1989, Willerson created the Institute of Molecular Medicine for the Prevention of Human Diseases.

== Early life and education ==
Willerson was born on November 16, 1939, in Lampasas, Texas but grew up in San Antonio. He was born to physician parents Darrell and Eleanor Willerson, who sparked his interest in medicine. As a youth, he followed his father on house calls and his mother arranged a meeting with cardiologist Denton Cooley when he was 14. Willerson attended the San Antonio Academy and the Texas Military Institute, where he led the swimming team to a state championship, before enrolling at the University of Texas at Austin (UT).

During his undergraduate career, Willerson helped UT capture the 400-yard freestyle relay championship at the 1961 Southwest Conference meet and was a three-year letterman. He graduated from Phi Beta Kappa as the student-athlete with the highest grade point average. From there, he enrolled at Baylor College of Medicine for his medical degree, and spent his summers working with Cooley, before finishing his residency at Massachusetts General Hospital (MGH) and Harvard Medical School. Willerson remained connected to UT and joined George Smith as an assistant coach of the San Antonio Aquatic Club. He was named a "Distinguished Alumnus" by the Baylor College of Medicine in 1998 and a "Distinguished Alumnus" by The University of Texas at Austin in 1999. While at MGH, Willerson was greatly influenced by Roman DeSanctis, a clinician’s clinician, and by Edgar Haber, a physician-scientist working in the field of immunology.

== Career ==
In 1972, Willerson was recruited to UT Southwestern Medical School Faculty and Parkland Hospital in Dallas to help build their nascent cardiology programs. He was subsequently encouraged to move to Houston in 1989 to become the Chairman of Internal Medicine at the new McGovern Medical School at University of Texas Health Science Center at Houston and collaborate in studies with Cooley. Immediately upon arrival, Willerson stated his goal to establish the Institute of Molecular Medicine for the Prevention of Human Diseases in Houston’s Texas Medical Center. While serving in the role of Chairman, Willerson was named to the American Clinical and Climatological Association alongside Don W. Powell and elected a Member of the Institute of Medicine of the National Academy of Sciences.

Willerson accepted various administrative roles throughout his career, including chief of medical services at Memorial Hermann Hospital, editor-in-chief of Circulation, medical director of the Texas Heart Institute, chief of cardiology at St. Luke's Episcopal Hospital, and adjunct professor at Baylor College of Medicine. He was forced to leave a few of his positions to accept the appointment of the president of the University of Texas Health Science Center at Houston. During his tenure as president, Willerson oversaw the construction of five major facilities. In 2007, Willerson stepped down from his position as president of the University of Texas Health Science Center at Houston to succeed Cooley as head of the Texas Heart Institute. Following this, he was inducted into the Texas Longhorn Hall of Fame and named the recipient of the 2010 PTV Sciences Star of Texas Healthcare Award. As well, an Endowed Chair position at the Brown Foundation Institute of Molecular Medicine for the Prevention of Human Diseases was named in his honor.

On July 1, 2011, Willerson was appointed President and Medical Director of the Texas Heart Institute, which he served until June 30, 2014. Upon stepping down from the position, he was named President Emeritus of Texas Heart Institute where he was expected to "share THI’s advances and vision for the future of cardiovascular discovery." In 2017, UT named their cardiovascular research center at the Institute for Computational Engineering and Sciences in honor of Willerson. He was also appointed an honorary Editor-in-Chief of the journal Clinical Medicine and Therapeutics. Willerson died on September 16, 2020, from cancer. He was posthumously elected President Emeritus of UTHealth, becoming the first person to be awarded that distinction.

== Personal life ==
Willerson was married to Dr. Nancy Willerson, a retired nurse.
