= Children's Learning Institute =

Institute at the University of Texas Health Science Center at Houston

The Children's Learning Institute at The University of Texas Health Science Center at Houston (UTHealth Houston) is an institute that combines scholarship from the fields of education, psychology, neurodevelopment and medicine, dedicated to designing, researching, and implementing programs for children based on empirical research.

== History ==
Prior to the creation of the Children's Learning Institute, the Department of Developmental Pediatrics at McGovern Medical School at UTHealth Houston housed two nationally recognized centers: the Center for Academic and Reading Skills (CARS) and the Center for Improving the Readiness of Children for Learning and Education (CIRCLE).

Established in 1996, CARS was devoted to improving academic skills in children through research and implementation. CARS enhanced the educational experience of students by bringing evidence-based learning approaches to the classroom, developing teachers’ knowledge about the conditions under which students learn, and helping teachers assess students’ strengths and weaknesses, form instructional plans and monitor progress.

In the fall of 1999, Texas First Lady Laura Bush identified CIRCLE to lead then-Governor George W. Bush’s early childhood education initiative. CIRCLE was established as the state's premier center for early childhood education and focused on providing training to early childhood teachers and caregivers by positively impacting teachers’ skills in language and literacy. The goal was to help families and teachers assist young children in preparing for reading and learning before they entered kindergarten.

Texas Governor Rick Perry designated CIRCLE as the State Center for Early Childhood Development in 2003. Pleased with the changes occurring in participating early childhood classrooms, the 78th Legislature passed Senate Bill 76 that same year, appointing the State Center with the task of implementing the statewide school readiness demonstration research project known as the Texas Early Education Model (now known as Texas School Ready).

The University of Texas System Board of Regents officially merged the two centers and their various programs in 2003, creating the Children's Learning Institute.

== Clinics ==
The Children's Learning Institute operates the Duncan Clinic:

- Dan L Duncan Children's Neurodevelopmental Clinic – provides developmental pediatrics and neuropsychology services to children and young adults with anxiety disorders, attention-deficit hyperactivity disorder, autism spectrum disorders, depression, genetic conditions, learning disabilities, traumatic brain injuries and other conditions.

== Programs ==
The Children's Learning Institute oversees several programs:

- Texas School Ready (TSR)
- Play and Learning Strategies (PALS)
- CLI Engage
- Reach Out and Read-Texas
- Texas Early Childhood Professional Development System (TECPDS)
- Texas Infant-Toddler Specialist Network
