= Laura Spector (visual artist) =

American visual artist

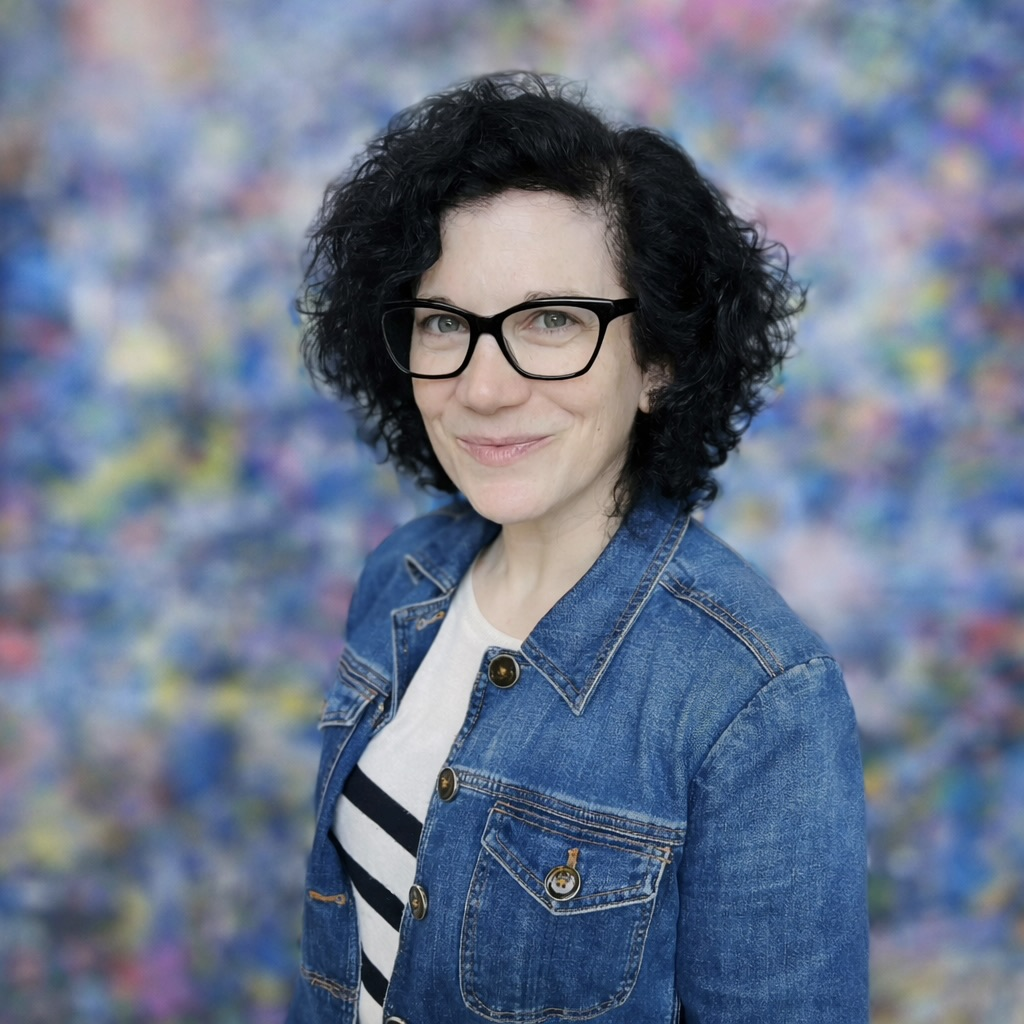
- Occupation: Visual artist
- Known for: Museum Anatomy, Personal Stories, Art Immersion programs
- Website: LauraSpector.com

Laura Spector is an American visual artist based in Houston, Texas. She is best known for Museum Anatomy, an internationally exhibited photographic series created using water-based theatrical makeup to recreate lost or stolen classical paintings on the human body. The project expanded into Museum Anatomy – Heist, in which she reinterprets stolen and destroyed artworks onto figure casts using oil paint. In addition to her collaborative work, Spector creates narrative acrylic paintings inspired by vintage aesthetics and organizes global Art Immersion programs.

== Artistic career ==
Spector first gained international attention through Museum Anatomy, a collaborative project with artist Chadwick Gray. The series involves recreating paintings lost to war, censorship, or theft by painting them with theatrical makeup directly onto the human body. The painted bodies are then photographed to produce a hybrid of classical art, performance, and photography. Select works also reinterpret lost imagery in oil on sculptural body casts.

The project received broad media coverage including features in The Guardian, Fast Company, La Repubblica, CBC, Yahoo, BBC Portuguese, and Houston Public Media. It has been cited in Harvard Design Magazine and Wendy Steiner's book The Real Real Thing: The Model in the Mirror of Art.

In 1996, a solo exhibition in Prague led to Spector and Gray becoming the first artists censored in the Czech Republic since the Velvet Revolution.

In 2016, Spector was invited to reinterpret Lucas Cranach's The Lord's Vineyard altarpiece at AtelierHaus Hilmsen in Germany. The resulting work, The Divide, reflects the original's controversial symbolism. The original was commissioned by Martin Luther and ordered destroyed by the Pope, leading to a church being burned; it survives today in the Friedrich Danneil Museum in Salzwedel.

Her contemporary series, Personal Stories, painted in acrylic and influenced by turn-of-the-century French poster art, explores identity, technology, grief, and transformation. It was exhibited at Georgetown Art Center and was scheduled for The Jung Center Houston in October 2025.

== Awards and Residencies ==
- Joan Mitchell Center Residency, New Orleans
- New York Foundation for the Arts Fellowship
- Houston Arts Alliance Individual Artist Grants (twice awarded)
- McGovern Medical School Ethics and Humanities Residency, Houston
- AtelierHaus Hilmsen Residency, Germany
