= Vicki Huff =

American geneticist and cancer researcher

Vicki D. Huff is an American geneticist and cancer researcher. She is a professor in the department of genetics and the director of the Sequence and Microarray Facility at University of Texas MD Anderson Cancer Center. Huff is also a professor at UTHealth Graduate School of Biomedical Sciences. She completed a doctor of philosophy in human genetics at University of Michigan in 1987. From 1987 to 1990, Huff was a postdoctoral fellow in biochemistry and molecular biology at MD Anderson Cancer Center.
