= Ken Chen (computational biologist) =

Chinese-American computational biologist

- Education: Tsinghua University (B.Eng., 1996); University of Illinois Urbana-Champaign (Ph.D., 2004)
- Known for: BreakDancer, single-cell genomics, cancer computational methods
- Scientific career
- Fields: Computational biology, Bioinformatics, Cancer genomics
- Workplaces: University of Texas MD Anderson Cancer Center

Ken Chen is a computational biologist whose work spans cancer genomics, single-cell transcriptomics, and computational oncology. He is a tenured professor in the Department of Bioinformatics and Computational Biology at the University of Texas MD Anderson Cancer Center, where he directs bioinformatics programs in personalized cancer therapy and single-cell genomics. He is known for developing BreakDancer, a computational algorithm for detecting genomic structural variation, and for contributing bioinformatics methods to major international consortia including The Cancer Genome Atlas (TCGA), the 1000 Genomes Project, and the Human Cell Atlas.

== Early life and education ==
Chen studied precision instrumentation at Tsinghua University in Beijing, earning a B.Eng. in 1996. His undergraduate training combined mechanical engineering, measurement systems, and quantitative methods.

He pursued a Ph.D. in Electrical and Computer Engineering at the University of Illinois Urbana-Champaign under the supervision of Mark Hasegawa-Johnson, completing it in 2004. During his doctoral studies, his focus shifted from signal processing and speech recognition toward computational methods for analyzing complex biological data. He also held visiting researcher positions at Microsoft Research Asia in Beijing (2001) and at the Center for Language and Speech Processing at Johns Hopkins University (2004).

== Career ==
Following his doctorate, Chen completed postdoctoral training in Biophysics and Biochemistry at the University of California San Diego (2005). He then joined the Genome Institute at Washington University in St. Louis, where he worked under Elaine Mardis from 2005 to 2011. During this period, he contributed to large-scale cancer genome sequencing work, including the studies of the first cancer acute myeloid leukemia genome, and co-developed several variant-calling tools such as BreakDancer and VarScan.

In 2011, Chen joined the University of Texas MD Anderson Cancer Center as an assistant professor in the Department of Bioinformatics and Computational Biology. He was promoted to associate professor in 2016, full professor in 2021, and interim department chair in 2026.

At MD Anderson, Chen serves as director of bioinformatics for the Institute for Personalized Cancer Therapy and co-director of the GSBS Quantitative Science program. He taught in GS01 1143 "Introduction to Bioinformatics" since 2012. He chairs the Gulf Coast Single Cell and Spatial Omics Consortium and holds an adjunct faculty appointment in computer science at Rice University. His laboratory has received independent research funding from the National Institutes of Health (NIH), Advanced Research Projects Agency for Health (ARPR-H), the Cancer Prevention and Research Institute of Texas (CPRIT), and the Chan Zuckerberg Initiative.

== Research ==
Chen's laboratory develops computational methods for analyzing large-scale genomic, single-cell, and spatial transcriptomic data, with applications spanning cancer biology, tumor immunology, and precision medicine. Building on his background in signal processing and machine learning, the lab has expanded its scope from structural variant detection in bulk sequencing data to single-cell and spatial genomics, cancer evolution, immunotherapy modeling, and clinical AI. The lab has contributed bioinformatics analyses to major international consortia including The Cancer Genome Atlas, the 1000 Genomes Project, the Human Cell Atlas, the PreCancer Atlas, and the Cancer Target Discovery and Development (CTD2) Network.

=== Cancer Genomics ===
Chen was involved in the whole genome sequencing and profiling of the first cancer genome, led by Timothy J. Ley. Chen's earliest and most cited contribution is BreakDancer, a computational algorithm for detection of genomic structural variants — including insertions, deletions, inversions, and translocations — from paired-end sequencing data, published in Nature Methods in 2009. The tool was used in large-scale cancer genome sequencing projects including those of the TCGA and the 1000 Genomes Project. Related tools co-developed by Chen include SomaticSniper and VarScan for somatic variant calling, CREST for base-pair resolution mapping of structural variation, novoBreak for cancer-specific structural variant detection, and TransVar for multi-level variant annotation across DNA, RNA, and protein.

=== Single-cell and spatial transcriptomics ===
As large-scale bulk sequencing matured, Chen's lab shifted focus toward single-cell and spatial transcriptomics, developing tools that characterize gene expression at the resolution of individual cells and their spatial context within tissues. His lab developed Monopogen, for detecting single-nucleotide variants directly from single-cell sequencing data; bindSC, for cross-platform integration of single-cell datasets including scRNA-seq, scATAC-seq, and spatial omics.; GSDensity, for pathway-centric analysis of single-cell and spatial data; METAFlux, for metabolic flux analysis of single-cell and spatial data;. Other tools from the lab include MEDALT, for copy number phylogeny inference of single-cell and spatial data; and CellTrek, a method that integrates single-cell RNA sequencing with spatial transcriptomics data to map individual cells to their physical locations within tissue sections.

=== Immuno-oncology and cell therapy ===
Chen's lab has expanded into tumor immunology and computational support for cancer clinical trials. He contributed to the computational analysis of a phase 1/2 clinical trial of allogeneic CD19-targeted CAR-NK cells in B-cell malignancies, published in Nature Medicine in 2024, which reported durable responses without graft-versus-host disease.; and discovery of effector regulatory T cells depletion as a potential mechanism of Immune checkpoint therapy response in Human papillomavirus infection (HPV+) head and neck cancer patients. His lab has also developed agent-based computational models to simulate cellular dynamics in adoptive cell therapy.

=== Applied machine learning and artificial intelligence ===
Drawing on his doctoral background in machine learning and signal processing, Chen's lab applies artificial intelligence methods to genomics and clinical medicine. This work includes the Immune Cell Knowledge Graph (ICKG), an AI tool that uses natural language processing to annotate immunological gene sets by mining biomedical literature at scale. The lab has also developed multimodal deep learning models for clinical prediction, including a longitudinal model for forecasting acute kidney injury and resource utilization in ICU patients.

== Awards and honors ==
- Fellow, American Institute for Medical and Biological Engineering (AIMBE), 2025
- Celebration of Faculty Excellence in Research, University of Texas MD Anderson Cancer Center, 2024
- Winner, "NIH Complement-ARIE Challenge Prize". National Institutes of Health., 2024
- Robert M. Chamberlain Distinguished Mentor Award, "MD Anderson Postdoctoral Association"., 2023
- Wall of Science, MD Anderson Cancer Center, 2023 and 2026
- Highest Commendation, University of Texas MD Anderson Cancer Center UTHealth Houston Graduate School of Biomedical Sciences, 2023
- President's Recognition of Faculty Excellence in Research, University of Texas MD Anderson Cancer Center, 2021
- Andrew Sabin Family Fellow, University of Texas MD Anderson Cancer Center, 2016–2018
- Senior member, The Institute of Electrical and Electronics Engineers (IEEE), 2009
- Elected member, Sigma Xi, Scientific Research Honor Society
- Elected member, Phi Kappa Phi, Honor Society

== Selected publications ==
Chen has authored or co-authored over 200 peer-reviewed articles. The following is a selection of high-impact works spanning his career.

=== Structural variant detection ===
- Chen, K.; Wallis, J.W.; McLellan, M.D.; Larson, D.E.; et al. (2009). "BreakDancer: an algorithm for high-resolution mapping of genomic structural variation". Nature Methods. 6 (9): 677–681. doi:10.1038/nmeth.1363. PMC 3661775. PMID 19668202.
- Chen, K.; Navin, N.E.; Wang, Y.; et al. (2013). "BreakTrans: uncovering the genomic architecture of gene fusions". Genome Biology. 14 (8): R87. doi:10.1186/gb-2013-14-8-r87. PMC 4053947. PMID 23972288.
- Mills, R.; Walter, K.; Stewart, C.; Handsaker, R.; Chen, K.; et al. (2011). "Mapping copy number variation by population-scale genome sequencing". Nature. 470 (7332): 59–65. Bibcode:2011Natur.470...59.. doi:10.1038/nature09708. PMC 3077050. PMID 21293372.

=== Cancer genomics ===
- Ley, T.; Mardis, E.; Ding, L.; Fulton, B.; et al. (2008). "DNA sequencing of a cytogenetically normal acute myeloid leukaemia genome". Nature. 456 (7218): 66–72. Bibcode:2008Natur.456...66L. doi:10.1038/nature07485. PMC 2603574. PMID 18987736.
- Ding, L.; Ley, T.J.; Larson, D.E.; Miller, C.A.; et al. (2012). "Clonal evolution in relapsed acute myeloid leukemia revealed by whole-genome sequencing". Nature. 481 (7382): 506–510. Bibcode:2012Natur.481..506D. doi:10.1038/nature10738. PMC 3267864. PMID 22237025.
- Welch, J.S.; Ley, T.J.; Link, D.C.; Miller, C.A.; et al. (2012). "The origin and evolution of mutations in acute myeloid leukemia". Cell. 150 (2): 264–278. doi:10.1016/j.cell.2012.06.023. PMC 3407563. PMID 22817890.
- Govindan, R.; Ding, L.; Griffith, M.; Subramanian, J.; et al. (2012). "Genomic landscape of non-small cell lung cancer in smokers and never-smokers". Cell. 150 (6): 1121–1134. doi:10.1016/j.cell.2012.08.024. PMC 3656590. PMID 22980976.
- ICGC/TCGA Pan-Cancer Analysis of Whole Genomes Consortium (2020). "Pan-cancer analysis of whole genomes". Nature. 578 (7793): 82–93. Bibcode:2020Natur.578...82I. doi:10.1038/s41586-020-1969-6. PMC 7025898. PMID 32025007.

=== Single-cell and spatial transcriptomics ===
- Dou, J.; Tan, Y.; Navin, N.; Chen, R.; Chen, K. (2020). "Single-nucleotide variant calling in single-cell sequencing data with Monopogen". Nature Biotechnology. 42 (5): 803–812. doi:10.1038/s41587-023-01873-x. PMC 11098741. PMID 37592035.
- Huang, Y.; Mohanty, V.; Dede, M.; Chen, K. (2023). "Characterizing cancer metabolism from bulk and single-cell RNA-seq data using METAFlux". Nature Communications. 14 (1) 4883. Bibcode:2023NatCo..14.4883H. doi:10.1038/s41467-023-40457-w. PMC 10423258. PMID 37573313.
- Liang, Q.; Huang, Y.; He, S.; Chen, K. (2023). "Pathway centric analysis for single-cell RNA-seq and spatial transcriptomics data with GSDensity". Nature Communications. 14 (1): 8416. Bibcode:2023NatCo..14.8416L. doi:10.1038/s41467-023-44206-x. PMC 10728168. PMID 38110427.
- Liang, Q.; Solis Soto, L.; Haymaker, C.; Chen, K. (2025). "LSGI: interpretable spatial gradient analysis for spatial transcriptomics data". Genome Biology. 26 (1): 238. doi:10.1186/s13059-025-03716-1. PMC 12333196. PMID 40781324.

=== Immuno-oncology and cell therapy ===
- Jiang, X.; Rudqvist, N.P.; Jiang, B.; Ye, S.; et al. (2025). "Depletion of Effector Regulatory T Cells Associates with Major Response to Induction Dual Immune Checkpoint Blockade". Cancer Discovery. 15 (8): 1569–1592. doi:10.1158/2159-8290.CD-24-1390. PMC 12319410. PMID 40249124.
- Marin, D.; Li, Y.; Basar, R.; Rafei, H.; et al. (2024). "Safety, efficacy and determinants of response of allogeneic CD19-specific CAR-NK cells in CD19+ B cell tumors: a phase 1/2 trial". Nature Medicine. 30 (3): 772–784. doi:10.1038/s41591-023-02785-8. PMC 10957466. PMID 38238616.
- Shanley, M.; Daher, M.; Dou, J.; et al. (2024). "Interleukin-21 engineering enhances NK cell activity against glioblastoma via CEBPD". Cancer Cell. 42 (8): 1450–1466. doi:10.1016/j.ccell.2024.07.006. PMC 11370652. PMID 39137729.
- Rafei, H.; Basar, R.; Acharya, S.; et al. (2025). "CREM is a regulatory checkpoint of CAR and IL-15 signalling in NK cells". Nature. 643 (8073): 1076–1086. Bibcode:2025Natur.643.1076R. doi:10.1038/s41586-025-09087-8. PMC 12286855. PMID 40468083.

=== Applied machine learning and artificial intelligence ===
- Wang, Y.; Casarin, S.; Daher, M.; Mohanty, V.; et al. (2026). "Agent-based modeling of cellular dynamics in adoptive cell therapy". Communications Biology. 9 (1) 409. doi:10.1038/s42003-026-09653-4. PMC 13004971. PMID 41673469.
- He, S.; Tan, Y.; Ye, Q.; Gubin, M.; et al. (2026). "Literature-scaled immunological gene set annotation using AI-powered immune cell knowledge graph (ICKG)". npj Artificial Intelligence. 2 (1): 13. doi:10.1038/s44387-025-00060-4. PMC 12846910. PMID 41614120.
- Tan, Yukun; Dede, Merve; Mohanty, Vakul; Dou, Jinzhuang; et al. (2024). "Forecasting acute kidney injury and resource utilization in ICU patients using longitudinal, multimodal models". Journal of Biomedical Informatics. 154 104648. doi:10.1016/j.jbi.2024.104648. medRxiv 10.1101/2024.03.14.24304230. PMC 12374600. PMID 38692464.

=== Multi-omics and translational cancer biology ===
- Islam, M.; Yang, Y.; Simmons, A.J.; et al. (2024). "Temporal recording of mammalian development and precancer". Nature. 634 (8036): 1187–1195. Bibcode:2024Natur.634.1187I. doi:10.1038/s41586-024-07954-4. PMC 11525190. PMID 39478207.
- Zhu, B.; Chen, P.; Aminu, M.; et al. (2025). "Spatial and multi-omics analysis of human and mouse lung adenocarcinoma precursors reveals TIM-3 as a putative target for precancer interception". Cancer Cell. 43 (6): 1125–1140.e10. doi:10.1016/j.ccell.2025.04.003. PMC 12151776. PMID 40345189.
