= Stanley Dudrick =

American surgeon (1935–2020)

- Born: April 9, 1935; Nanticoke, Pennsylvania, United States
- Died: January 18, 2020 (aged 84); Eaton, New Hampshire, U.S.
- Education: Franklin and Marshall College (B.S.); University of Pennsylvania School of Medicine (M.D.)
- Known for: Total parenteral nutrition
- Scientific career
- Fields: Medicine

Stanley John Dudrick (April 9, 1935 – January 18, 2020) was a surgeon who pioneered the use of total parenteral nutrition (TPN).

== Early life and education ==
Dudrick was born in Nanticoke, Pennsylvania, the grandson of Polish immigrants. His father was a coal miner and his mother a factory worker. At age seven he decided to become a doctor after seeing the care his mother received during a serious illness. He graduated Franklin and Marshall College in 1957. Graduating cum laude with a degree in biology with honors, he was awarded the Williamson Medal, the highest honor for student achievement. His first research project, done in college, was growing tomato plants and studying the effects of magnesium doses in the soil. In an interview, Dudrick stated:

The entire ethos of Franklin & Marshall College infected me and transformed me from a kid from the coal regions to an avid would-be scholar. They just imbued in me the importance of knowledge, that nothing was more precious than to gain knowledge and then to pass it on to others.

He received his medical degree from the University of Pennsylvania School of Medicine.

== Career ==
As a surgical resident at the University of Pennsylvania, Dudrick realized that post-surgical malnutrition was a poorly recognized cause of death in patients who could not eat or absorb nutrients. From 1964 to 1966, he worked with his mentor, Dr. Jonathon Rhoads, in developing TPN. After many hours in the lab at the swing balances, measuring the precise amount of each chemical required, he was able to keep beagles alive for months with TPN, by-passing their digestive systems. After showing the feasibility in lab animals, in 1967 he applied the technique to sick infants and then adults. Nutrition including carbohydrates, fats, proteins, vitamins and minerals were given directly into the circulatory system. In the subsequent decades Dudrick continued making significant contributions to the field. His contribution to field of medicine has been compared to Joseph Lister and Alexander Fleming, among others. The Geisinger School of Medicine wrote:

The number of lives of children that have been saved is estimated at over 10 million, and the benefit to adults with a range of conditions is no less substantial. TPN is a lifesaving mainstay of therapy for a great proportion of the most critically ill patients in hospitals worldwide and amounts to one of the most significant developments in the history of surgery.

Dudrick stayed at the University of Pennsylvania after finishing his residency, and became a full professor after only five years. He left in 1972 to become the founding chairman of the Department of Surgery at the University of Texas Health Science Center at Houston. He followed this up becoming chairman of surgery at the University of Pennsylvania, and then with professorships at Yale and Geisinger medical schools.

In 1975, Dudrick founded the American Society for Parenteral and Enteral Nutrition (ASPEN) serving as the first society president. ASPEN currently has 6,500 members and is a leading organization focused on improving nutrition clinical care and research on clinical nutrition.

Dudrick received over 100 national and international awards, including the American Surgical Association’s first Flance-Karl Award in 1997 for his seminal and lifetime scientific contributions to surgery; the American College of Surgeons Jacobsen Innovation Award in 2005; named by Medscape in 2016 as one of the 50 most influential physicians in history; named a "Hero in Surgery" in 2014 by the American College of Surgeons, one of four people to have this distinction at that time; the American Surgical Association's highest honor in 2009, the Medallion for Scientific Achievement. He served on the Franklin and Marshall Board of Trustees and was awarded an honorary doctorate from the college.

== Personal ==
In medical school he married Theresa Keen, and had six children.

Stanley Dudrick died on January 18, 2020, in Eaton, New Hampshire, due to complications of ailments including kidney failure.
