= Omaida C. Velazquez =

Cuban-American vascular surgeon

- Born: Cuba
- Occupations: Vascular Surgeon; Researcher

Academic background
- Education: University of Medicine and Dentistry of New Jersey (MD); Stevens Institute of Technology (BS)

Academic work
- Institutions: University of Miami

Omaida Caridad Velazquez is a Cuban-American surgeon and researcher. In 2015, she became the first Latina woman to lead a major academic surgery department in the United States, at University of Miami (UM) Health System-Leonard M. Miller School of Medicine, a position she held until 2023. She holds the David Kimmelman Endowed Chair in Vascular and Endovascular Surgery at the University of Miami and was inducted into the National Academy of Medicine in 2022.

== Early life and education ==
Velazquez was born in Cuba. Her father worked as ambulance driver and her mother was a seamstress. After 15 years of unsuccessfully applying for permission to leave Cuba, she and her family immigrated to the United States during the Mariel boatlift crisis.

After high school in Union City, New Jersey, she earned a BS in Chemical Biology from the Stevens Institute of Technology. She completed undergraduate research on the chemotherapeutic effects of sodium cyanate. She received a MD from the University of Medicine and Dentistry of New Jersey in 1991, where she was valedictorian of her class. Velazquez completed her residency in general surgery and fellowship in vascular and endovascular surgery, both at the University of Pennsylvania. In 1997, she received the Jonathan E. Rhoads Research Award as a resident.

== Career and research ==
Velazquez began her academic career after residency at the University of Pennsylvania, where she co-authored works on topics including abdominal aortic aneurysm repair, angiogenesis, and vasculogenesis.

In 2007, Velazquez became the Chief of the Vascular and Endovascular Division at the University of Miami (UM) Health System-Leonard M. Miller School of Medicine. She was inducted into the American Society for Clinical Investigators in 2009. In 2015, she was promoted to chair of surgery, becoming the first Latina woman to lead a major academic surgery department in the United States.

Her work with University of Miamicolleague Zhao-Jun Liu showed E-selectin to be an important factor in promoting angiogenesis and healing, as well as a potential target for gene therapy. This research led to a patent and the creation of a biotechnology company, Ambulero, Inc., in 2019. The company, supported by funding from the National Institutes of Health, has received orphan drug designation to advance its candidate for Buerger disease, a rare form of vasculitis that can lead to limb amputation. Velazquez serves as Chief Medical Officer of Ambulero.

In 2021, she was recognized as the Latina Pioneer of the Year at the 20th Annual Hispanic Women of Distinction Charity Awards Luncheon.

Velazquez was inducted into the National Academy of Medicine in 2022. She is also a Distinguished Fellow of the Society for Vascular Surgery.

In 2023, she was dismissed from her position as chair of surgery. Velazquez subsequently filed a lawsuit against the University of Miami through her attorneys, alleging discrimination and retaliation. As of September 2024 the case is ongoing and she remains a tenured professor at University of Miami.

== Selected publications ==
- Gallagher, Katherine A.; Liu, Zhao-Jun; Xiao, Min; Chen, Haiying; Goldstein, Lee J.; Buerk, Donald G.; Nedeau, April; Thom, Stephen R.; Velazquez, Omaida C. (2007-05-01). "Diabetic impairments in NO-mediated endothelial progenitor cell mobilization and homing are reversed by hyperoxia and SDF-1α". Journal of Clinical Investigation. 117 (5). American Society for Clinical Investigation: 1249–1259. doi:10.1172/jci29710. ISSN 0021-9738. PMC 1857264. PMID 17476357.
- Liu, Zhao-Jun; Shirakawa, Takashi; Li, Yan; Soma, Akinobu; Oka, Masahiro; Dotto, G. Paolo; Fairman, Ronald M.; Velazquez, Omaida C.; Herlyn, Meenhard (2003-01-01). "Regulation of Notch1 and Dll4 by Vascular Endothelial Growth Factor in Arterial Endothelial Cells: Implications for Modulating Arteriogenesis and Angiogenesis". Molecular and Cellular Biology. 23 (1): 14–25. doi:10.1128/MCB.23.1.14-25.2003. ISSN 1098-5549. PMC 140667. PMID 12482957.
- Généreux, Philippe; Webb, John G.; Svensson, Lars G.; Kodali, Susheel K.; Satler, Lowell F.; Fearon, William F.; Davidson, Charles J.; Eisenhauer, Andrew C.; Makkar, Raj R.; Bergman, Geoffrey W.; Babaliaros, Vasilis; Bavaria, Joseph E.; Velazquez, Omaida C.; Williams, Mathew R.; Hueter, Irene; Xu, Ke; Leon, Martin B. (2012). "Vascular Complications After Transcatheter Aortic Valve Replacement". Journal of the American College of Cardiology. 60 (12): 1043–1052. doi:10.1016/j.jacc.2012.07.003. PMID 22883632.

== Honors and awards ==
Velazquez is a Distinguished Fellow of the Society for Vascular Surgery, and was elected to the National Academy of Medicine in 2022.
