= Ronald P. Rapini =

American dermatologist

Ronald P. Rapini born 1954 in Akron, Ohio, is an American dermatologist and dermatopathologist. He is the Chernosky Distinguished Professor and Chair of the Department of Dermatology at the University of Texas Health Science Center at Houston and MD Anderson Cancer Center.

== Biography ==
He received his medical degree from Ohio State University in 1978 and did an internship at Marshfield Clinic (1978–1979) and Dermatology residency at the University of Iowa (1979–1982), as well as a fellowship at the University of Colorado Health Sciences Center (1982–1983).

As department chair from 2002 to the present, he has led considerable growth in the dermatology program. The combined program at UTHSC and MD Anderson Cancer Center has 27 full time faculty, 21 dermatology residents, and 3 fellows as of July 2020. A number of his trainees went on to national recognition including receiving the AMA Foundation Leadership Award.

He has served as the president of the American Board of Dermatology, the American Society of Dermatopathology, the American Society for Mohs Surgery, the Houston Dermatological Society, and the Texas Dermatological Society. Several society awards have recognized his work, such as the Walter Nickel Award from the American Society of Dermatopathology for excellence in teaching in 2005. He also received the Founder's Award from American Society of Dermatopathology, on October 12, 2012, and the Robert G. Freeman Mentoring and Leadership award from the Texas Dermatological Society, May 17, 2013

He is the sole author of the textbook Practical Dermatopathology (2005, Mosby), which is widely used around the world, and former lead co-editor of the two-volume text Dermatology (2nd. ed 2007, Mosby). The two-volume Dermatology is a primary clinical and training textbook used in many dermatology training programs and dermatology clinics across the world. As of July 2020, he has published 142 peer-reviewed articles and has been a speaker at 473 meetings in the US and throughout the world. He has also authored 65 textbook chapters, including 3 chapters for eMedicine.

He described the first case of swimmer's itch to occur in exposed skin and described the first case of herpetic paronychia occurring in an atopic patient while on isotretinoin therapy for acne. He confirmed that the incidence of epidermolytic hyperkeratosis is higher in association with dysplastic nevi than in ordinary melanocytic nevi and may serve as a marker for nevus with architectural disorder.
