= Bruce C. Kone =

American biologist (born 1958)

- Born: January 29, 1958 (age 68)
- Education: Bachelors Princeton University, M.D. University of Florida College of Medicine
- Known for: Physician-scientist, leader in academic medicine, United States Masters Swimming champion

Bruce C. Kone (born January 29, 1958) is an American professor, nephrologist and molecular biologist. He is also a World Aquatics Masters Swimming world record holder, United States Masters Swimming (USMS) national record holder, twenty-three-time USMS national champion, and nine-time FINA Masters world's top-ranked age group swimmer. He is currently a tenured professor of medicine at the McGovern Medical School (UTHealth).

== Career ==
A naturalized citizen of the United States, he was born in Frankfurt, Germany. He attended Pine Crest Preparatory School in Fort Lauderdale, Florida, where he was a scholar-athlete awardee, All-American swimmer, and selected to the Athletic Hall of Fame and the Arete Society. In 1979, he received his A.B. in English (cum laude) and captained the varsity swimming team at Princeton University. He then completed his M.D. (Honors in Research) at the University of Florida College of Medicine in 1983, a residency in internal medicine at the Johns Hopkins Hospital, Johns Hopkins University School of Medicine, and a nephrology fellowship at Brigham and Women's Hospital, Harvard Medical School.

Kone held faculty positions at the Johns Hopkins University School of Medicine (1989–91) and the University of Florida College of Medicine (1991–95) before joining the University of Texas Medical School at Houston (now known as the McGovern Medical School) in 1995. He was selected by Nobel Laureate Ferid Murad to be the inaugural chief of the division of clinical pharmacology (1998–99). Kone then went on to be director of the division of renal diseases and hypertension (2000–06), vice-chairman (2000–03) and then chairman (2004–07) of the department of internal medicine (2004–07), and inaugural holder of The James T. and Nancy B. Willerson Chair (2001–07) at that institution. He also served as the chief of nephrology (2000–06) and of internal medicine (2004–07) at Memorial Hermann - Texas Medical Center Hospital and chief of the section of nephrology at The University of Texas M.D. Anderson Cancer Center (2000–06). In 2007, at the age of 49, he became the youngest medical school dean in the United States when he was appointed the Folke H. Peterson/Dean's Distinguished Professor and eighth Dean of the University of Florida College of Medicine. As dean, he played a lead role in establishing a partnership between the University of Florida and the H. Lee Moffitt Cancer Center and Research Institute and Shands HealthCare for cancer care and research, and recruited an internationally regarded leader in cancer care and research, Joseph V. Simone, M.D., to lead the University of Florida and Shands Cancer Center. Kone also championed new clinical quality, access, and safety initiatives. During his tenure as dean, the number of clinical specialties at the UF-affiliated Shands Teaching Hospital recognized in the U.S. News & World Report rankings of "America's Best Hospitals" increased from 7 to 11, Shands Healthcare was selected for the Governor's Sterling Award for performance excellence, the UF Clinical and Translational Science Institute was established, and state funding to the University of Florida for medical education increased for the first time in seven years. Kone also championed diversity and gender equity, expanding the Office of Minority Affairs, appointing the first African-American as chairman of a department at the University of Florida College of Medicine, and appointing women to endowed professorships department chair, and associate dean positions. Kone then returned to the McGovern Medical School at the University of Texas Health Sciences Center at Houston, where he was appointed Professor of Medicine with Tenure and a faculty member of the University of Texas M.D. Anderson/UTHealth Graduate School of Biomedical Sciences.

== Controversy ==
In May 2008, University of Florida president J. Bernard Machen abruptly "relieved" Kone of his duties as Dean of the University of Florida College of Medicine amid two controversies. The first controversy was Kone's decision --- publicly supported by Machen --- to override the medical selection committee and admit the son of a politically active physician who was personally recommended by Governor Charlie Crist and State Senate President Ken Pruitt, which was disclosed when medical selection committee members breached the accepted student's confidentiality to the press, (the student subsequently graduated from the UF College of Medicine and is a practicing physician in Florida). Kone defended his decision to override the medical selection committee in public statements and in a letter to the editor of Academic Medicine., noting that the student was transferring from an elite BS/MD program at Northwestern University Medical School that guaranteed admission to medical school without the MCAT requirement, which was identical to the Junior Honors Program at UF College of Medicine that accounted for 10-15% of the medical school class. He also noted that the applicant had very favorable interviews with two UF College of Medicine Admissions Committee faculty members.

The second controversy involved Kone's objections regarding "deals" that had been struck by his predecessor C. Craig Tisher, M.D. and senior administrative officials to rehire senior administrators who had completed the Deferred Retirement Option Program (DROP), which allowed public employees who had worked 30 years or are older than 62 to retire, but kept working five years while their benefits earn 6.5 percent interest in a special account. Under program rules, retiring employees could return to their previous jobs provided recruiting and the University's affirmative action search processes were followed. Still, they were required to cease working for at least a month and could not receive a monthly retirement benefit for the next 11 months if they also received a university salary. Kone discovered that senior officials who had retired under DROP were rehired without the required recruiting and affirmative action search processes. Moreover, they were often provided the 11 months of retirement benefits proscribed in DROP. In two cases, senior administrators were rehired or planned to be rehired using agreements with the UF medical campus in Jacksonville to skirt the ban on immediate rehiring set out in DROP. Kone discovered this process when presented with a pre-retirement agreement Tisher made with senior associate dean Robert W. Watson, M.D. to continue employment in a lucrative endowed position and to provide a six-month paid sabbatical after his return. When Kone advised Machen of this pre-retirement arrangement, Machen wrote in a Nov. 25, 2007, e-mail, that it represented "a prostitution of the University" and "one of the worst abuses of non-profit status I have ever seen. Shame on everyone involved." The University of Florida investigated the DROP matter and concluded that senior UF officials violated the spirit of a University policy by receiving DROP payouts to retire and then be rehired without searches for other candidates, in some cases also receiving perks such as bonuses and raises. The report also concluded that Kone's refusal to honor the Watson agreement prevented a violation of the law. The University's General Counsel at the time, Jamie Lewis Keith, later resigned after a lawsuit and an internal audit that reported she may have altered and withheld requested public records unlawfully used university funds to pay for outside legal counsel, and deleted an email exchange with then-President Machen about a quid pro quo for renegotiating their administrative contracts. On June 18, 2009, Florida Governor Crist signed into law the "Double-dipping Reform Bill" to prevent state employees from simultaneously collecting retirement benefits and a salary.

On June 30, 2009, Kone resigned from the University of Florida to return to the University of Texas Medical School at Houston and received a settlement award of $517,000 from the University of Florida Board of Trustees.

== Honors ==
Kone has been elected a Fellow of the AAAS, the American College of Physicians, the American College of Clinical Pharmacology, the American Society of Nephrology, and the American Heart Association, and to membership in the American Clinical and Climatological Association He received an Established Investigator Award from the American Heart Association, and has been continuously funded by the National Institutes of Health for his kidney research since 1986. He was President of the Southern Society of Clinical Investigation, and a member of the Leadership Council on the Kidney in Cardiovascular Disease of the American Heart Association.

He has served as an associate editor of Clinical and Translational Science, and a member of the editorial boards of the American Journal of Physiology. Renal Physiology, the American Journal of Physiology. Endocrinology and Metabolism, the Journal of the American Society of Nephrology, Kidney International, the American Journal of Medicine, and the World Journal of Biological Chemistry. Kone has served on the Florida Tobacco Education and Use Prevention Advisory Council of the Florida Department of Health, the Board of the Memorial Hermann Healthcare System Physicians of Texas, Houston, Texas, and was president and Chairman of the University of Florida Proton Therapy Institute. He is a past member of the Public Policy Committee of the American College of Clinical Pharmacology. He was selected by his peers to "Best Doctors in America" 2005-2019 and to Marquis "Who's Who In America" and "Who's Who in the World" in 2009 - 2019, and "Who's Who in Science and Engineering" in 2010 - 2016. In 2016, he was elected to the Academy of Master Educators at the McGovern Medical School at The University of Texas Health Science Center at Houston. Kone is also recognized as an American record holder (2014, 2015, 2018, 2019), All-American (2010, 2013-2022), Pool All-Star (2014, 2019), and twenty-six time national age group champion in United States Masters Swimming. He co-held a FINA Masters first-place ranking in the world in 2013, garnered two first-place world rankings in 2014, one first-place world ranking in 2015, 2016, 2018-2021, and 2023-24. In 2023, Kone set a world masters swimming record in the 50 short-course meters butterfly.
