= Columbia University School of Nursing =

Private graduate school in New York City, New York US

Coordinates: 40.84174°N 73.94039°W

- Type: Private
- Established: 1892
- Parent institution: Columbia University
- Dean: Lorraine Frazier
- Location: New York, New York
- Campus: Urban
- Website: www.nursing.columbia.edu

The Columbia University School of Nursing is the graduate school of nursing at Columbia University in the Washington Heights neighborhood of Manhattan, New York City. Founded in 1892, it stands as one of the oldest nursing schools in the United States.

The School of Nursing was the first in the United States to award a master's degree in a clinical nursing specialty (1956). The school is a World Health Organization Collaborating Center for Advanced Practice Nursing.

== History ==
Presbyterian Hospital, a major New York City teaching hospital that later formed part of the Columbia-Presbyterian Medical Center, was established in 1872. Administrators soon had trouble finding competent staff and recognized a need for qualified nurses. In 1892, the School of Nursing was founded as the Presbyterian Hospital Training School for Nurses, with Anna C. Maxwell serving as its first dean.

Maxwell organized and directed the training school from 1892 to 1921, and developed a structured program that combined classroom instruction with supervised clinical practice. Historical materials from Columbia University describe her as the guiding force behind the Presbyterian Hospital Training School for Nurses, which later evolved into the Columbia University School of Nursing. Under her leadership, the scope and duration of the curriculum expanded, and it later became affiliated with Columbia University. This affiliation led to the awarding of nursing degrees by the university.

During the Spanish-American War (1898), Maxwell took leave to lead a Red Cross nursing contingent at Camp Thomas in Chickamauga Park, Georgia. US Army historical texts list her as one of the first nurses assigned to Sternberg Hospital there.

According to the American Journal of Nursing, she also served on the committee that organized the Red Cross Nursing Service, which later functioned as a reserve for the Army and Navy Nurse Corps. This coincided with the increasing involvement of hospital-based nursing school graduates in national public and military health services.

The early curriculum which was largely taught by physicians, combined ward-based clinical training with classroom lectures. It included instruction in hygiene, bacteriology, anatomy, bandaging, and bedside care, obstetrics, contagious diseases and home nursing skills, such as preparing food for patients. On May 15, 1894, 21 students, all females, became members of the first graduating class. Maxwell Hall opened within the new Columbia-Presbyterian Medical Center in 1928. The building was named in her honor. According to a 1929 American Journal of Nursing biography, Maxwell contributed to the plans for the new nurses’ residence that bore her name. She was also the first patient transferred to the new Harkness Pavilion when the medical center opened.

In 1937, the nursing school formally became affiliated with Columbia University. The first Bachelor of Science degrees were awarded to students in 1940.

In 1955, the School of Nursing was the first U.S. nursing school to establish a graduate university-based midwifery program. According to a peer-reviewed historical timeline of U.S. nurse-midwifery reports that the school also introduced a nurse-midwifery clinical service in 1954. Both the clinical service and the 1955 education program were led by Mary Crawford, a graduate of the Maternity Center Association (MCA).In 1956, the School of Nursing became the first in the country to award a master's degree in a clinical nursing specialty. The emphasis on clinical scholarship is considered appropriate due to collaboration of the School of Nursing with other professional schools at Columbia. In 1984, the school's new home became the Georgian Building. In 2017, the nursing school moved into a new 68,000-square-foot building designed by the architectural firms of FXFOWLE in New York and CO Architects in Los Angeles. The School of Nursing shares the Columbia University Medical Center campus with the School of Public Health, the School of Dental and Oral Surgery, and the College of Physicians and Surgeons. The school has clinical partnerships at over 200 clinical practice sites throughout New York City. The School of Nursing also has affiliations with three major medical centers: New York-Presbyterian, Mount Sinai Hospital, and Mount Sinai Morningside.

== Academics ==
The School of Nursing offers a number of degree programs for the training of Registered Nurses, Nurse Practitioners, Certified Nurse Midwives, Nurse Anesthetists, Clinical Nurse Leaders, and Nurse-Scientists.

It offers a 15-month accelerated Master's Direct Entry (MDE) program for non-nurse college graduates. A Doctor of Nursing Practice (DNP) program for established Registered Nurses (Lateral-entry) or through their combined (MDE/DNP) seamless entry option, offering six Advanced Practice specialties: Adult-Gerontology Acute Care NP, Adult-Gerontology Primary Care NP, Family NP, Nurse-Midwifery, Pediatric-Primary Care NP, and Psychiatric-Mental Health NP. The school also offers an entry-level Doctor of Nursing Practice (DNP) program specializing in nurse anesthesia, and a Master of Clinical Management and Leadership. A research-based Doctorate of Philosophy (Ph.D) degree is also offered, with research focus areas across the gamma of healthcare.

The clinical-based Doctor of Nursing Practice (D.N.P.) degree was first developed by the school's faculty in 2004 as one of the first such programs in the nation. The additional competencies embodied in this degree were based on the experience and outcomes research of the clinical faculty. It is the first 'advanced practice' doctorate involving direct and comprehensive patient care of a panel of patients across sites and over time in the whole country.

As clinical evidence is both built from and applied to practice, the School of Nursing provides its students with the Acute Care Nurse Practitioner (ACNP) program in order to achieve evidence-based practice(EBP). The ACNP program was reconfigured to incorporate both theoretical and practical skills to foster an approach to clinical care geared toward older adults and persons with disabilities. The 47-credit masters ACNP program consist of core courses, supporting sciences, and specialty courses.

Core courses and supporting sciences for all nurse practitioners include physiology, pathophysiology, pharmacology, introduction to primary care, advanced physical assessment, genetics, health and social policy, and theory and research.

== Deans ==
- Anna C. Maxwell (1892–1921)
- Helen Young (1921–1937)
- Margaret Conrad (1937–1950)
- Eleanor Lee (1950–1961)
- Elizabeth Gill (1961–1968)
- Mary Crawford (1968–1976)
- Helen Pettit (1976–1981)
- Joann S. Jamann-Riley (1981–1985)
- Mary Mundinger (1986–2010)
- Bobbie Berkowitz (2010–2018)
- Lorraine Frazier (2018–present)

== Facility ==
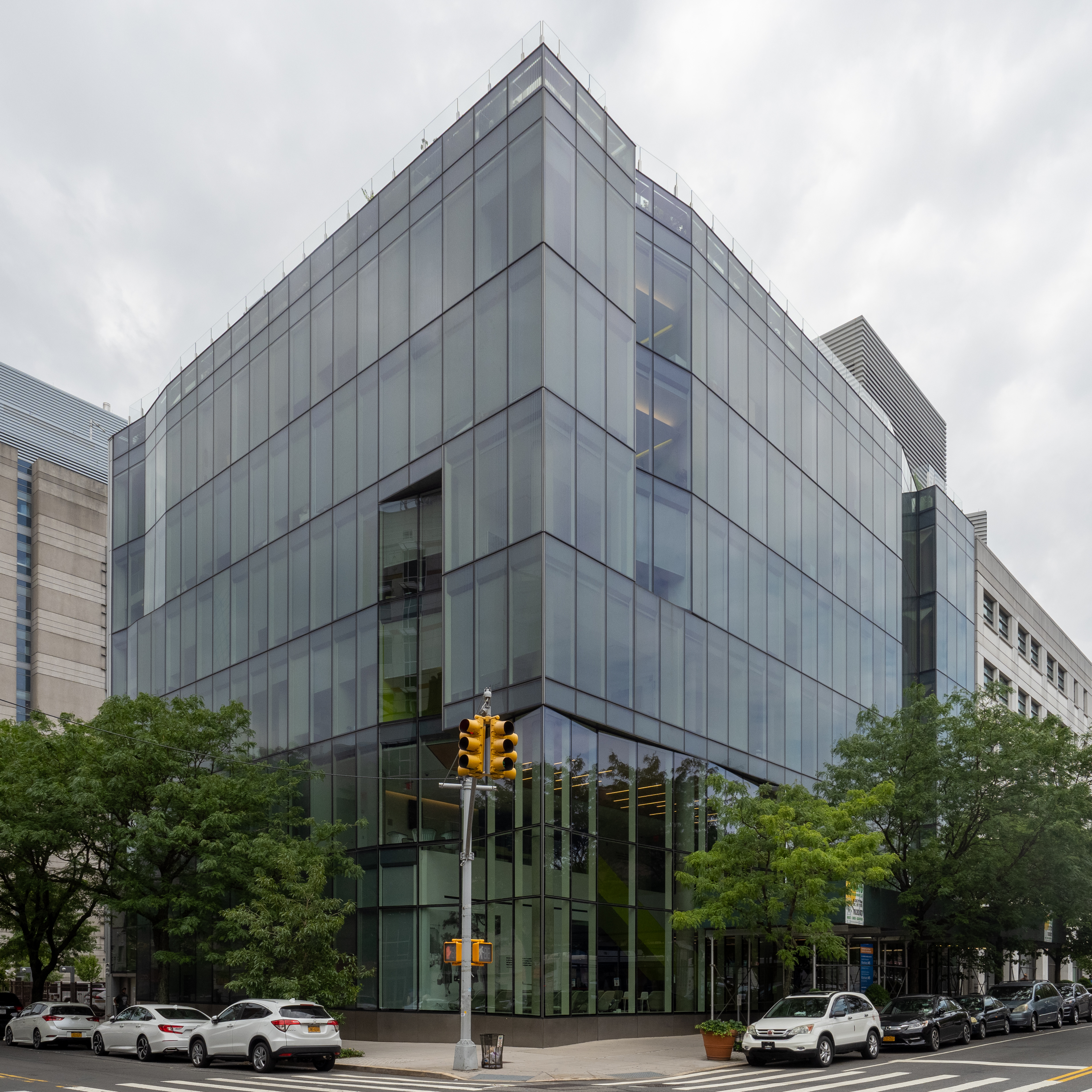
School of Nursing - June 2021

In June 2017, the School of Nursing moved into a new seven story-building at the corner of West 168th Street and Audubon Avenue, at the east end of the Columbia University Medical Center campus in northern Manhattan. Columbia held a dedication ceremony on June 8, 2017 for the seven-story, 68,000-square-foot building. Reports describe the building’s key design features including a lobby stair sequence that leads to a roof terrace and etched-glass facades that bring in diffuse light. They also described the building’s program elements such as clinical simulation labs and research centers located in the building’s core.The 68,000-square-foot glass structure was designed by CO|FXFOWLE, a joint venture of two award-winning architecture firms. The building includes the Helene Fuld Health Trust Simulation Center to help students learn complex clinical techniques and includes a mock in-patient room, exam room, critical care unit, an operation room, and three teaching skill labs.
