= Theresa Koehler =

American microbiologist

- Education: University of Massachusetts Amherst; Virginia Tech
- Scientific career
- Workplaces: McGovern Medical School; Harvard Medical School
- Thesis: Plasmid-related differences in capsule production by Bacillus anthracis and characterization of a fertility plasmid from Bacillus subtilis (natto) (1987)

Theresa Marie Koehler is an American microbiologist who is the Herbert L. and Margaret W. DuPont Distinguished Professor in Biomedical Sciences and Chair of the Department of Microbiology and Molecular Genetics at McGovern Medical School. She is known for her extensive research on anthrax and was elected Fellow of the American Association for the Advancement of Science in 2021. As of July 1, 2024, Koehler is the President of the American Society for Microbiology for the 2024-2025 year.

== Early life and education ==
Koehler was an undergraduate student in biology at Virginia Tech. She moved to the University of Massachusetts Amherst for graduate studies, where she focused on microbiology. She remained there for her doctoral research. Koehler was a postdoctoral fellow at Harvard Medical School.

== Research and career ==
In 1991, Koehler joined the faculty at McGovern Medical School. Her research considers host-pathogen interactions, with a particular focus on the Bacillus cereus group species. As an internationally-recognized expert on anthrax, her laboratory was one of the few institutions licensed by the Centers for Disease Control and Prevention to investigate the bacterium in the early 2000s.

Koehler served on the editorial board of the Journal of Bacteriology. She currently serves as Associate Editor of PLOS Pathogens. She is Chair of the National Institutes of Health Review Group on Bacterial Pathogenesis.

== Awards and honors ==
- 2008 Elected Fellow of the American Academy of Microbiology
- 2009 Paul E. Darlington Award
- 2021 Elected Fellow of the American Association for the Advancement of Science

== Selected publications ==
- Timothy D. Read; Scott N. Peterson; Nicolas Tourasse; et al. (May 1, 2003). "The genome sequence of Bacillus anthracis Ames and comparison to closely related bacteria". Nature. 423 (6935): 81–86. doi:10.1038/nature01586. ISSN 1476-4687. PMID 12721629. Wikidata Q22122503.
- B D Green; L Battisti; T M Koehler; C B Thorne; B E Ivins (August 1985). "Demonstration of a capsule plasmid in Bacillus anthracis". Infection and Immunity. 49 (2): 291–7. doi:10.1128/iai.49.2.291-297.1985. ISSN 0019-9567. PMC 262013. PMID 3926644. Wikidata Q28307237.
- R T Okinaka; K Cloud; O Hampton; et al. (October 1, 1999). "Sequence and organization of pXO1, the large Bacillus anthracis plasmid harboring the anthrax toxin genes". Journal of Bacteriology. 181 (20): 6509–6515. doi:10.1128/jb.181.20.6509-6515.1999. ISSN 0021-9193. PMC 103788. PMID 10515943. Wikidata Q33638407.
