= R. Lee Clark =

R. Lee Clark (July 2, 1906 – May 3, 1994) was a surgical oncologist and the first permanent director of MD Anderson Cancer Center.

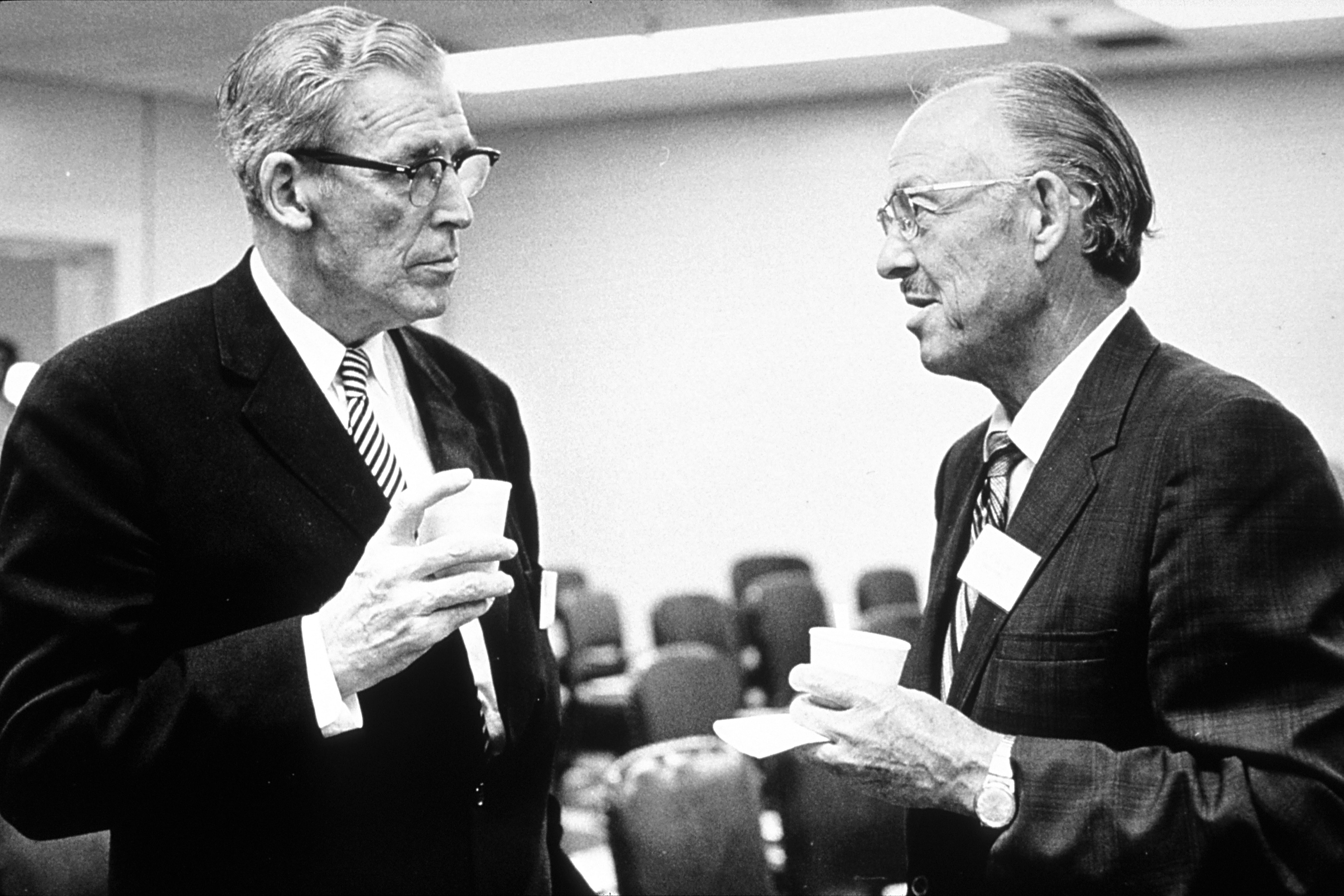
Lee Clark (on right) with Jonathan Rhoads

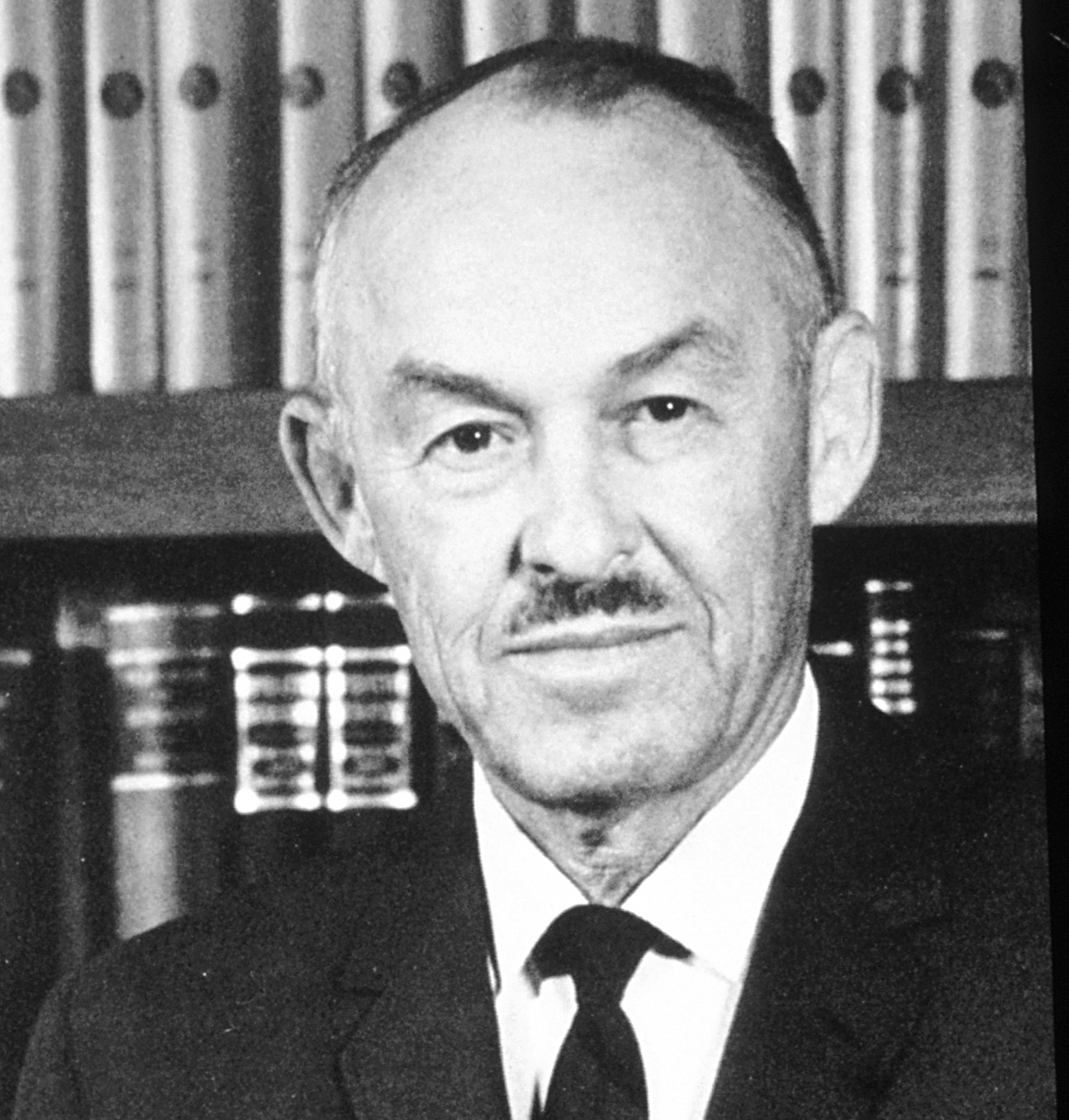
Dr. R. Lee Clark, MD

== Early life ==
Randolph Lee Clark Jr. was born in Hereford, Texas, one of nine children. He was born into a family of educators, with both his father, Randolph Lee Clark, and grandfather having been college presidents and founders. His father founded Midwestern State University and his grandfather co-founded Texas Christian University. His mother was a musician and teacher. After his father's death he preferred to be called R. Lee Clark. After graduating Wichita Falls High School, his undergraduate studies were at the University of South Carolina, with dual degrees in chemical engineering and pre-med. During his college years he received strong emotional support from his family but little financial support. During college summer breaks he bagged freshly cut wheat across the Texas panhandle. In college he played baseball and boxed and wrestled. As a sophomore he won the National Amateur Athletic Federation 155 pound wrestling championship. He graduated from the Medical College of Virginia in 1932. Post-graduate training in surgery was at the American Hospital of Paris as chief resident in surgery, followed by a four year fellowship at the Mayo Clinic. After the Mayo Clinic he was a general surgeon in Jackson, Mississippi for two years. His early general surgical experience was prodigious, with over 2000 cases during his four years at Mayo (1935–1939) and over 1200 cases in Jackson. In 1942 he commissioned into the Army Air Forces as chief of surgery at a 1000-bed North Carolina hospital with 30 surgeons under him. In 1944 he became chief of the Experimental Surgical Unit at Wright Patterson Field and Consultant to the Air Surgeon General. The first flight suit was developed during his tenure there. In 1945 he moved to Randolph Field in San Antonio as chairman of the surgery department at the School of Aviation Medicine. He published numerous articles on problems in aviation medicine and was editor of Air Surgeons Bulletin. While at Randolph was trained to fly the B-29.

== MD Anderson career ==
In 1946 after a politically contentious and prolonged recruitment process Clark was appointed director and surgeon-in-chief at MD Anderson Cancer Center.

Five other physicians were offered the position before him... The selection process was snafued and prolonged because Regent D. Frank Strickland filibustered for his own candidate for the permanent job. And it was not Dr. R. Lee Clark Jr. who was favored by the other eight Regents.

The center had been founded five years earlier; development was limited due to wartime induced expenses and shortages in building supplies. At the time Clark came on board, there were 22 employees; the cancer hospital was housed on the old rat infested six acre Houston estate of Capt. James Baker (grandfather of James Baker); and, research labs were in the adjacent stables. He was tasked with the job of developing what would become the nation's first cancer hospital within a university system. When offered the position he wrote back on Randolph Fields stationary:

The three chief aims of the project are the education, treatment, and research activities relative to the disease of cancer. These aims are the theme of the whole enterprise and are likewise the keynote of function of each single department.

Clark obtained surplus army barracks which were converted into operating rooms, out-patient clinics, labs and hospital rooms. Under his supervision the center expanded to 22 acres on donated Houston woodland in 1954 with a 310-bed hospital. Three further additions under his watch put MD Anderson among the largest cancer centers in the world. He became president of the center in 1968. When he retired in 1978 he had served as an administrator longer than anyone in the University of Texas' history. He helped shape the National Cancer Act of 1971, and served under three presidents overseeing the implementation of the act. MD Anderson was one of first three comprehensive cancer centers designated by the Cancer Act. Clark's then-novel interdisciplinary approach at MD Anderson was a model for cancer centers around the world; he felt that basic science and clinical laboratories and patient care facilities should be housed together to better integrate advances in cancer management. Among the multi-disciplinary fields Clark included in his team battle against cancer were radiation and medical oncology, epidemiology, and psychology Clark was a proponent of cobalt-60 radiotherapy, and in 1948 the first cobalt-60 unit was designed and tested at the center. Multiple issues delayed its first use in patients until 1954. Although they lost the race to be the first users of this technology, these pioneering efforts have been recognized to have made a leading contribution to the development of radiotherapy.

Dr. Clark endeavored to instill a culture of "connection to the people...a common touch" at the center. Clark felt that fundraising was critical to the success of the center. He has been described as "very hands on" in this effort. He created a development office, and maintained close ties with state legislators and university regents. He had "an extraordinary ability to raise money from private, state and federal sources." He was active in many local, national and international medical organizations, including the National Cancer Institute, American Cancer Society, the President's Cancer Panel, International Union Against Cancer and the American College of Surgeons. Among the honors he received are the Legion of Merit, Albert Lasker Medical Research Award, Distinguished Service Award (American Collège of Surgeons), and Humanitarian and National Achievement Awards (American Cancer Society). In 1983 the outpatient clinic facility at M. D. Anderson was named the R. Lee Clark Clinic Building.

== Personal ==
Clark married Bertha Margaret Davis, MD, an anesthesiologist from Asheville, North Carolina, on June 11, 1932. They were married 61 years; her death was a year before his. They had two children, Randolph Lee and Rabia Lynn.
