= University of Texas MD Anderson Cancer Center UTHealth Houston Graduate School of Biomedical Sciences =

The University of Texas MD Anderson Cancer Center UTHealth Houston Graduate School of Biomedical Sciences (GSBS), is a joint venture of the University of Texas Health Science Center at Houston (UTHealth Houston) and the University of Texas MD Anderson Cancer Center. It offers Ph.D. and M.S. degrees in many areas of study, and a M.D./Ph.D. program in collaboration with McGovern Medical School at UTHealth Houston, and it is fully accredited by the Southern Association of Colleges and Schools through both its parent institutions, UTHealth Houston and UT MD Anderson. It is located in the heart of the Texas Medical Center, the largest medical complex and life sciences destination the world.

== History ==
In 1962 there was a movement, led by the University of Texas MD Anderson Cancer Center President, R. Lee Clark, M.D., to establish The University of Texas Graduate School of Biomedical Sciences in Houston. At that time there were 13 pre-doctoral (Ph.D.) students studying with scientists at MD Anderson enrolled through The University of Texas at Austin. Six UT MD Anderson scientists were special members, and four scientists were special associates, in the Graduate School Faculty at Austin.

The University of Texas Graduate School of Biomedical Sciences at Houston was established by Texas House Bill 500 on June 11, 1963, and activated by the Board of Regents of The University of Texas on September 28, 1963.

At a meeting of the Texas Commission of Higher Education on October 14, 1963, approval was given for Master of Science and Doctor of Philosophy degree programs in:

"Biology including, but not restricted to, areas of emphasis in radiobiology, biomathematics, genetics, cytology, fine structure-electron microscope-analysis, molecular biology, with biochemistry and biophysics, microbiology and virology.

"Biochemistry including, but not restricted to, areas of emphasis in molecular biology and chemical physiology.

"Physics including, but not restricted to, areas of emphasis in biophysics, nuclear medicine, and isotope studies.

"with the stipulation that all areas of emphasis to be added in the future shall come within the three categories listed above (i.e., Biology, Biochemistry, and Physics) and that the areas of emphasis be restricted to biomedical sciences that are adapted to the research facilities of the M. D. Anderson Hospital and Tumor Institute."

After a two-year national search to recruit an outstanding scientist as dean of the new school, Paul A. Weiss, Ph.D. was chosen. At the time of his GSBS appointment he was 66 and had just retired from the Rockefeller Institute. The Rockefeller graduate program, where the curriculum was interdisciplinary, was the prototype for Weiss' plan for the GSBS.

In 1970 The University of Texas Medical School at Houston was established, and, like the GSBS, was under the administration of The University of Texas MD Anderson Cancer Center. The basic science faculty at the Medical School were smoothly assimilated into the Graduate School faculty. Until then, most of the Graduate Faculty had their primary appointment at UT MD Anderson, with a few Graduate School faculty from the School of Dentistry and the School of Public health. In 1972 The University of Texas System established a University of Texas "Health Science Center" (in) Houston to be the administrative entity for all the UT schools in Houston. Prior to 1972, the GSBS Dean had direct access to the chancellor in Austin and all board of regents meetings.

In 2001 House Bill 753 conjoined the University of Texas Health Science Center and The University of Texas MD Anderson Cancer Center in the awarding of graduate degrees in the biomedical sciences through the Graduate School of Biomedical Sciences at Houston.

The University of Texas Graduate School of Biomedical Sciences (GSBS) moved into its new home, the June and Virgil Waggoner Academic Hall in UT MD Anderson's George and Cynthia Mitchell Basic Sciences Research Building in 2004.

The GSBS has over 600 of some of the world's best research faculty who are drawn from UTHealth Houston and UT MD Anderson. Its 550 students have a nearly equal proportion of men and women; one-third are from Texas, one-third are from the United States and one-third are international. The school offers Ph.D. degrees in nine (9) formal programs or a multi-discipline program, as well as two specialized masters programs: Genetic Counseling and Medical Physics.

In 2010 UT-Health Science Center was rebranded as UTHealth. Both of GSBS' parent organizations, UT MD Anderson and UTHealth Houston received unconditional recommendations for accreditation from the Southern Association of Colleges and Schools (SACS). Numerous GSBS doctoral programs ranked among the best in the nation in the National Research Council assessment announced in September 2010. In the following year, George M. Stancel, Ph.D., dean, was appointed to the position of executive vice president for academic affairs and research for UTHealth Houston, and a decanal search was begun.

By 2012, after a year's national search and deliberation by UTHealth Houston and UT MD Anderson, a dual deanship to provide overarching leadership and guidance was created for GSBS. The new deans are Michelle Barton, Ph.D., professor in the Department of Biochemistry and Molecular Biology at UT MD Anderson, and Michael Blackburn, Ph.D., professor and vice chair in the Department of Biochemistry and Molecular Biology at UTHealth Medical School.

In 2017, the school was renamed The University of Texas MD Anderson Cancer Center UTHealth Graduate School of Biomedical Sciences. The name celebrates the partnership of its two institutions and its shared commitment to the school's talented, innovative and passionate students and faculty.

In 2020, Barton retired from the school and UT MD Anderson to become the co-director, CEDAR, OHSU Knight Cancer Institute, School of Medicine. Blackburn retired from the school and UTHealth Houston in June 2022.

In 2022, Sharon Y.R. Dent, Ph.D., was named interim dean.

In 2024, Alejandro Aballay, Ph.D., was named dean.

== Deans ==
Name	Role	Years
Grant Taylor, M.D.	Acting Dean	1963-1965
Paul A. Weiss, Ph.D.		1965-1966
Sumter S. Arnim, D.D.S., Ph.D.		1966-1970
Alfred G. Knudson, M.D., Ph.D.		1970-1976
Margery Shaw, M.D.	Acting Dean	1977
Roger H. Hewitt, Ph.D.	Acting Dean	1978
R. W. Butcher, Ph.D.		1978—1994
Paul E. Darlington, Ph.D.	Interim Dean	1994-1999
George M. Stancel, Ph.D.		1999-2012
Michelle Barton, Ph.D.		2012–2020
Michael Blackburn, Ph.D.		2012-2022
Sharon Y.R. Dent, Ph.D.	Interim Dean	2022-2024
Alejandro Aballay, Ph.D.		2024-present
