= Alejandro Aballay =

American biologist

- Occupation: Biologist
- Known for: Member of American Association for the Advancement of Science

Alejandro Aballay, Ph.D., is an American biologist, currently Dean of The University of Texas MD Anderson Cancer Center UTHealth Houston Graduate School of Biomedical Sciences. Aballay was Professor and Chair of the Department of Molecular Microbiology & Immunology at Oregon Health & Science University until 2024. Before that, Aballay was Professor and the Director of the Center for Host-Microbial Interactions at Duke University School of Medicine until 2017. In 2013, he was elected to the American Association for the Advancement of Science.

== Education ==
Alejandro Aballay earned his bachelor's degree in pharmacy from Juan Agustín Maza University, in Mendoza, Argentina, in 1994. During this time, he worked as an undergraduate student at the National University of Cuyo, in Mendoza, Argentina, where he studied soil bioremediation. He finished his M.S. equivalent studies in 1995 and started exploring the machinery that governs early steps in endocytosis at Nacional de Cuyo University. During this period, he received a World Bank fellowship to complement his studies in endocytosis by working as a summer student for two consecutive years at Washington University, in St. Louis, Missouri. In 1998, he earned his Ph.D. at Nacional de Cuyo University and received a Pew Fellowship to move to St. Louis, where he continued his studies in endocytosis at Washington University.

== Work ==
In 1999, following an interest in bacterial pathogenesis he developed while studying the intracellular transport of Brucella abortus when he was a graduate student, he moved to Boston to join the Ausubel laboratory at Harvard Medical School. Aballay moved to Durham in 2002 to join the Department of Molecular Genetics and Microbiology, where his studies focus on what makes bacteria pathogenic and hosts resistant. In the Ausubel laboratory, Aballay developed a novel pathogenesis system utilizing the simple well-studied nematode Caenorhabditis elegans and the common human bacterial pathogen Salmonella enterica. Salmonella is well known for its ability to cause food poisoning. Nematodes like C. elegans eat bacteria and surprisingly C. elegans is killed when it is provided S. enterica as a food source. This killing is accompanied by a persistent infection of S. enterica in the C. elegans intestine. Importantly, Aballay has shown that several well-studied S. enterica virulence factors required for causing disease in mammalian hosts are also required for C. elegans killing. This validates the use of C. elegans as a host to model Salmonella infection in mammals, including humans. Aballay's laboratory takes advantage of the compromise between complexity and tractability of the C. elegans–S. enterica pathogenesis model. The focus of the laboratory is to use C. elegans as a host to screen thousands of bacterial clones from mutagenized libraries to identify novel Salmonella virulence factors and to address how they alter host signaling pathways. Since several components of innate immunity are conserved among different organisms throughout evolution, his group is also exploiting the genetic and genomic resources available for C. elegans to study the basis of the immune response.

== Awards ==
Aballay is a recipient of a number of awards, including: 2017 American Society for Microbiology fellowship, 2017 William A. Whitsell Dean's Leadership Professorship, 2017 Maximizing Investigator Research Award (MIRA/NIH), 2013 American Association for the Advancement of Science (AAAS) fellowship, 2009 Neuroimmunology of Brain Infections and Cancers Award, 2009 Howard Hughes Medical Institute (HHMI) Early Career Scientist Competition-Semifinalist, 2005 ICAAC Young Investigator Award, 2003 Whitehead Scholar in Biomedical Sciences, 1998 Pew Foundation Postdoctoral Fellowship.
