= Ali J. Marian =

American physician-scientist (born 1955)

Ali J. (AJ) Marian
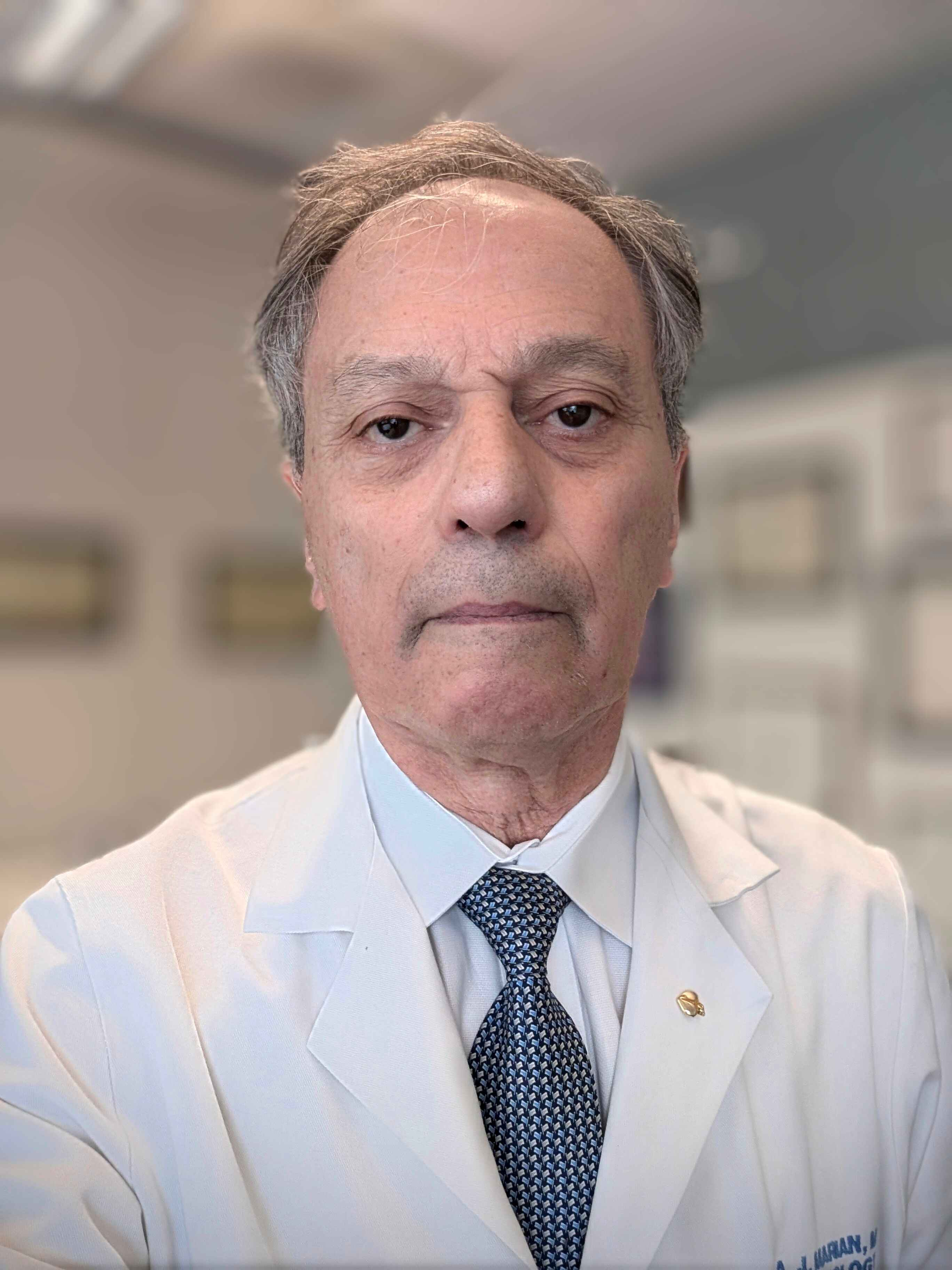
- Born: 10 December 1955 (age 70); Iran
- Occupations: Cardiologist, academic, and author

Academic background
- Education: Tehran University (M.D.)

Academic work
- Institutions: University of Texas Health Science Center

Ali J. (AJ) Marian (born 10 December 1955) is an American physician–scientist in the fields of cardiovascular medicine and genetics. He is a professor of molecular medicine (Genetics), professor of medicine (Cardiology), and director of the Center for Cardiovascular Genetic Research at the Brown Foundation Institute of Molecular Medicine at the University of Texas Health Science Center, Houston, Texas. He also holds the James T. Willerson Distinguished Chair in Cardiovascular Research and is most known for his works on the molecular genetics, genomics, and biology of cardiomyopathies.

== Education ==
Marian obtained his M.D. degree from Tehran University in Iran in 1981. He completed an Internal Medicine residency at John H. Stroger Jr. Hospital of Cook County in Chicago and a Cardiology fellowship at Baylor College of Medicine. He also completed The American Heart Association-Bugher Foundation research fellowship in human molecular genetics at Baylor College of Medicine.

== Career ==
Marian began his academic career in 1992 at Baylor College of Medicine as an instructor in medicine and was promoted to assistant professor in 1993 and associate professor in 2000, both in the Department of Medicine. He then joined the Brown Foundation Institute of Molecular Medicine as professor to establish the Center for Cardiovascular Genetic Research. Moreover, he also held clinical appointments at The Houston Methodist Hospital, Baylor St. Luke's Medical Center, and Ben Taub General Hospital.

== Research ==
Marian has focused on delineating the molecular genetics and pathogenesis of hereditary hypertrophic, dilated, and arrhythmogenic cardiomyopathies. He and his colleagues have identified several causal and modifier genes and mutations and have characterized several pathogenic pathways for hereditary cardiomyopathies. The group was among the first to implicate haplo-insufficiency as a mechanism in the pathogenesis of hypertrophic cardiomyopathy. Likewise, their work also established the reversibility of cardiac hypertrophy and fibrosis in cardiomyopathies and facilitated the development of therapies to prevent, attenuate, and reverse the phenotype in cardiomyopathies.

Marian and his trainees have defined the pathogenic role of the mechano-sensitive signaling pathways, including the Hippo and the canonical WNT pathways in arrhythmogenic cardiomyopathy, and delineated the cellular basis of its unique phenotype of fibro-adipogenesis and arrhythmias. Furthermore, the group also defined the genomic features of lamin A (LMNA)-cardiomyopathy and delineated several mechanisms.

A notable focus of Marian's research is the identification and characterization of DNA double-stranded breaks (DSBs) in the heart. His group has defined the genome-wide DSBs in cardiac myocytes and determined their contributions to heart failure. Moreover, the group also demonstrated the protective effects of the LMNA against DSBs, through increased DNA methylation and suppressed gene expression, demonstrating the involvement of transcription stress in the generation of DSBs in cardiac myocytes.

Marian has published about 250 articles in peer-reviewed journals, which collectively have garnered ~ 22,000 citations and an H index of 73. He is a former Deputy Editor for Circulation Research, Associate Editor for Circulation, and European Journal of Clinical Investigation. Moreover, he serves as the Deputy Editor for Cardiovascular Research, the Section Editor on Genetics for Current Opinion in Cardiology, and the editor-in-chief and founding editor of The Journal of Cardiovascular Aging.

== Awards and honors ==
- 1995 – Young Investigator Award, American College of Cardiology, Bethesda, Maryland
- 1997 – Established Investigator Award, American Heart Association
- 2006 – Clinician-Scientist Award in Translation Research, Burroughs Wellcome Fund
- 2018 – Best Editor Award, Circulation Research
- 2018 – Distinguished Scientist Award, Baylor College of Medicine-Luke's Medical Center
- 2021 – John Foerster Distinguished Lecture Award, University of Manitoba
- 2022 – Jay Mehta Annual Award for Clinical Scientists, International Academy of Cardiovascular Sciences
- 2022 – Margaret Billingham Award, Society of Cardiovascular Pathology
- 2023 – TOP EDITOR AWARD, Cardiovascular Research, European Society of Cardiology

== Selected articles ==
- Marian, A. J., Yu, Q. T., Mares, A., Hill, R., Roberts, R., & Perryman, M. B. (1992). Detection of a new mutation in the beta-myosin heavy chain gene in an individual with hypertrophic cardiomyopathy. The Journal of Clinical Investigation, 90(6), 2156–2165.
- Nagueh, S. F., McFalls, J., Meyer, D., Hill, R., Zoghbi, W. A., Tam, J. W., ... & Marian, A. J. (2003). Tissue Doppler imaging predicts the development of hypertrophic cardiomyopathy in subjects with subclinical disease. Circulation, 108(4), 395–398.
- Senthil, V., Chen, S. N., Tsybouleva, N., Halder, T., Nagueh, S. F., Willerson, J. T., ... & Marian, A. J. (2005). Prevention of cardiac hypertrophy by atorvastatin in a transgenic rabbit model of human hypertrophic cardiomyopathy. Circulation research, 97(3), 285–292.
- Garcia-Gras, E., Lombardi, R., Giocondo, M. J., Willerson, J. T., Schneider, M. D., Khoury, D. S., & Marian, A. J. (2006). Suppression of canonical Wnt/β-catenin signaling by nuclear plakoglobin recapitulates phenotype of arrhythmogenic right ventricular cardiomyopathy. The Journal of clinical investigation, 116(7), 2012–2021.
- Osio, A., Tan, L., Chen, S. N., Lombardi, R., Nagueh, S. F., Shete, S., ... & Marian, A. J. (2007). Myozenin 2 is a novel gene for human hypertrophic cardiomyopathy. Circulation research, 100(6), 766–768.
- Chen, S. N., Gurha, P., Lombardi, R., Ruggiero, A., Willerson, J. T., & Marian, A. (2014). The hippo pathway is activated and is a causal mechanism for adipogenesis in arrhythmogenic cardiomyopathy. Circulation research, 114(3), 454–468.
- Auguste, G., Gurha, P., Lombardi, R., Coarfa, C., Willerson, J. T., & Marian, A. J. (2018). Suppression of activated FOXO transcription factors in the heart prolongs survival in a mouse model of laminopathies. Circulation research, 122(5), 678–692.
- Chen, S. N., Lombardi, R., Karmouch, J., Tsai, J. Y., Czernuszewicz, G., Taylor, M. R., ... & Marian, A. J. (2019). DNA damage response/TP53 pathway is activated and contributes to the pathogenesis of dilated cardiomyopathy associated with LMNA (Lamin A/C) mutations. Circulation research, 124(6), 856–873.
- Cheedipudi, S. M., Asghar, S., & Marian, A. J. (2022). Genetic ablation of the DNA damage response pathway attenuates lamin-associated dilated cardiomyopathy in mice. Basic to Translational Science, 7(12), 1232–1245.
- Olcum, M., Fan, S., Rouhi, L., Cheedipudi, S., Cathcart, B., Jeong, H. H., ... & Marian, A. J. (2023). Genetic inactivation of β-catenin is salubrious, whereas its activation is deleterious in desmoplakin cardiomyopathy. Cardiovascular Research, 119(17), 2712–2728.
- Cathcart, B., Cheedipudi, S. M., Rouhi, L., Zhao, Z., Gurha, P., & Marian, A. J. (2024). DNA double-stranded breaks, a hallmark of aging, defined at the nucleotide resolution, are increased and associated with transcription in the cardiac myocytes in LMNA-cardiomyopathy. Cardiovascular Research, cvae063.
