= Jonathan Rhoads =

American surgeon (1907–2002)

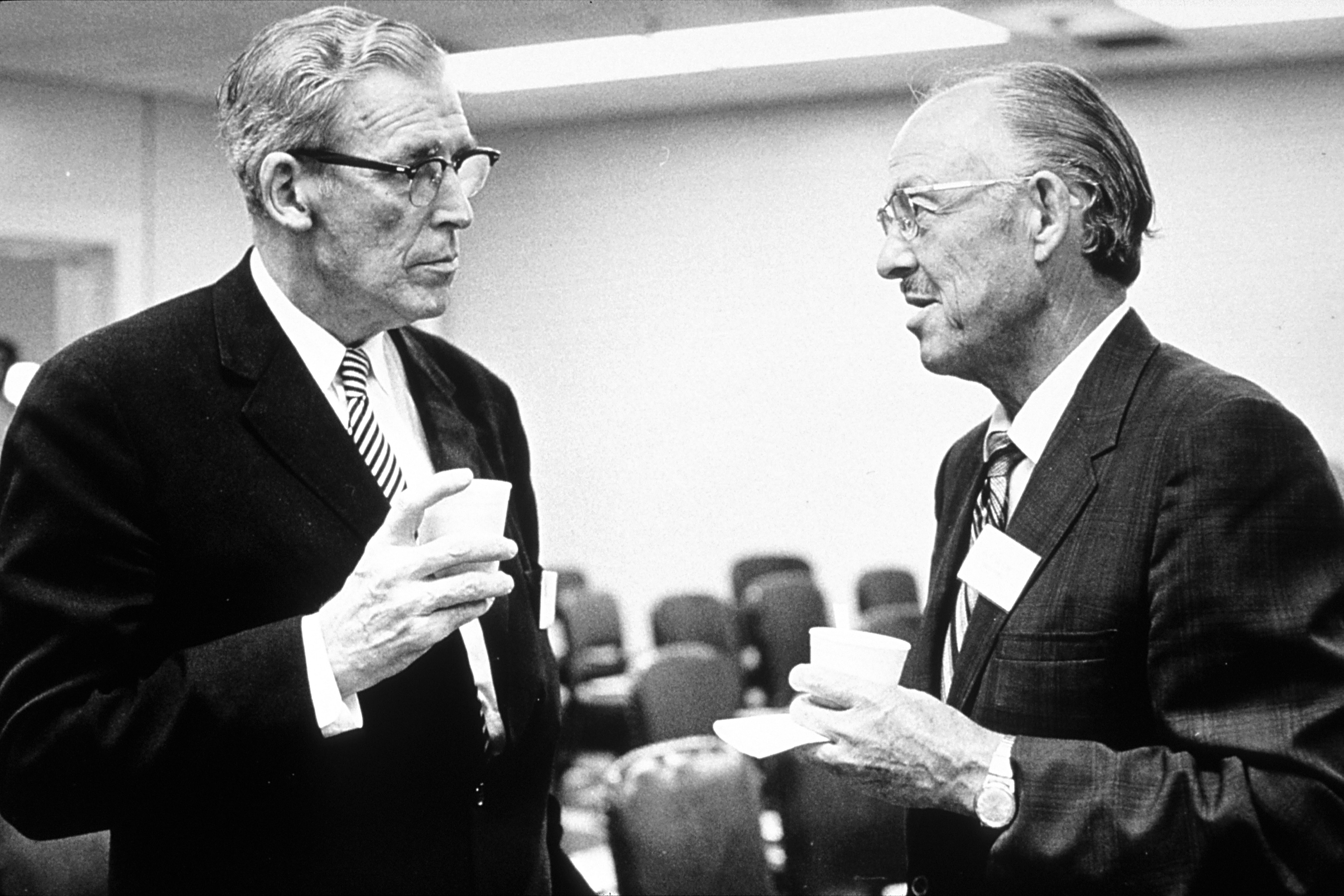
- Rhoads, on left, with Dr. R. Lee Clark; undated
- Born: Jonathan Evans Rhoads; May 9, 1907; Philadelphia, Pennsylvania, United States
- Died: January 2, 2002 (aged 94); Philadelphia, Pennsylvania, U.S.
- Education: Germantown Friends School; Westtown School; Haverford College; Johns Hopkins University School of Medicine (M.D.)
- Known for: Total parenteral nutrition Rhoads Textbook of Surgery
- Spouse(s): Terry Folin, Kathryn Goddard
- Scientific career
- Fields: Surgery
- Institutions: Hospital of the University of Pennsylvania

Jonathan Evans Rhoads (May 9, 1907 – January 2, 2002) was an American surgeon, responsible for the development of total parenteral nutrition (TPN).

== Early life and education ==
Rhoads was born to a Quaker family with roots in Pennsylvania dating to 1682. His father, Edward, was a physician in Philadelphia, who had interned under Sir William Osler at the Hospital of the University of Pennsylvania (HUP). He attended Germantown Friends School, Westtown School, Haverford College and Johns Hopkins School of Medicine, all Quaker affiliated. An accomplished athlete, he was a track and field star at Haverford, undefeated as a pole-vaulter in intercollegiate competition; during a college summer vacation, he swam the Bosporus between Europe and Asia. He graduated medical school in 1932 and was a surgical resident at the University of Pennsylvania Medical School from 1934–1939. During World War II, after the director went to Burma to command a hospital unit, he was left in charge of an undermanned surgical service, which included a young C. Everett Koop. He remained at Penn for his entire career, almost 70 years.

== Career ==
Rhoads most important contribution was in the field of nutrition. He began research in surgical nutrition in the 1930s and continued with the collaboration of his surgical residents. Working with his research fellow Stanley Dudrick, by 1964 they had success with TPN in dogs. In 1966 TPN was first successfully used in humans. TPN was quickly accepted and used worldwide. The success of the early cases was the culmination of Dr. Rhoads’ lifetime scientific obsession with perioperative nutrition. Nutrition including carbohydrates, fats, proteins, vitamins and minerals were successfully given directly into the circulatory system.

The number of lives of children that have been saved is estimated at over 10 million, and the benefit to adults with a range of conditions is no less substantial. TPN is a lifesaving mainstay of therapy for a great proportion of the most critically ill patients in hospitals worldwide and amounts to one of the most significant developments in the history of surgery.

A prolific author, he wrote a leading textbook of surgery, Rhoads' Textbook of Surgery, through four editions, as well publishing over 400 papers, many dealing with cancer. He was a president of the American Cancer Society and edited its journal, Cancer, for two decades. He made contributions in multiple other areas, including shock, burn, coagulation disorders and the use of sulfa to treat infections. An early proponent of peritoneal dialysis, he wrote an influential paper on this subject.

He was Provost of the University of Pennsylvania, from 1956–1959, and chairman of the Department of Surgery at the University from 1959–1972. While provost he scheduled surgeries for Saturdays and evenings. He was known as a mentor for young surgeons. From his 12 years as chairman, 62 of his surgical graduates achieved faculty positions at 34 medical schools, 11 as department chairmen. He was a visiting professor at 68 institutions, 62 came after his chairmanship. He was an editor of the Annals of Surgery for 55 years, until his death.

Rhoads was described as a Renaissance man, "preternatural student, physician, surgeon, teacher, scientist, investigator, innovator, advisor, [and] role model." And, from 1976-1984 he was president of the American Philosophical Society, founded by Benjamin Franklin in 1743.

== Personal ==
Rhoads credited his Quaker faith for enabling him to be a consensus builder and a successful leader. He was an active member of Germantown Friends Meeting. He served on committees overseeing local Quaker investments and Quaker schools: Germantown Friends School, Westtown School, and Bryn Mawr College. He went on medical missions to Vietnam and Korea through the American Friends Service Committee.

He met his wife, Terry Folin, a classmate, in medical school; they had six children. She became a pediatrician, but gave up her career to raise the children. She died in 1987 after 51 years of marriage. In 1990 he married distant cousin Kathryn Goddard, a pediatrician and the widow of a former Penn provost. He noted that he only married pediatricians and she only married former provosts; nevertheless, he said they were "not concerned over consanguinity." He was noted for "his quick wit, unique perspective, and a delightful sense of humor and good fellowship."

== Death ==
He stopped operating at age 80 but never retired, refusing emeritus status and remaining active until two weeks before he died at 94 from stomach cancer. When he could no longer eat, his life was extended for months, "which he greatly valued," by TPN. His last days were spent at the HUP pavilion which the University of Pennsylvania had named after him in 1994; he was cared for by his own department members and family.
