= Jane and Robert Cizik School of Nursing =

Public nursing school in Houston, Texas, US

Coordinates: 29.705732°N 95.398836°W

The Jane and Robert Cizik School of Nursing at the University of Texas Health Science Center at Houston (UTHealth Houston) is an American nursing education institution.

The school has graduated more than 15,000 nurses since its establishment in 1972. Its name was changed to the Jane and Robert Cizik School of Nursing at UTHealth Houston in 2017 in recognition of a gift of $25 million that endowed scholarships, faculty chairs, and research in addition to a distinguished lecture series.

Located in the Texas Medical Center, Cizik School of Nursing's building, which also serves as a student community center for the UTHealth Houston campus, opened in October 2004 and was awarded LEED Gold certification by the U.S. Green Building Council in 2009.

== Education ==
Cizik School of Nursing offers programs for the Bachelor of Science in Nursing (BSN), Master of Science in Nursing (MSN), Doctor of Nursing Practice (DNP), Doctor of Philosophy (PhD) in Nursing degrees as well as a number of post-graduate certificate programs, pre-nursing courses, and summer camps. Its academic programs are consistently well-ranked by U.S. News & World Report.

The BSN to DNP program admits students to adult/gerontology acute care nurse practitioner, psychiatric-mental health nurse practitioner, family nurse practitioner, and nursing leadership and administration tracks. These tracks are also offered as a post-graduate certificate program for MSN- or DNP-prepared nurses who desire additional education and/or role preparation. The school also offers a family nurse practitioner track in the MSN program and post-master's DNP in nursing leadership and administration track.

Nurse practitioners, clinical nurse specialists, and nurse anesthetists who have MSNs may also complete the coursework necessary to earn a DNP degree. Cizik School of Nursing was the first public university in Texas to offer a nine-semester BSN-DNP in nurse anesthesia program. The school also offers an emergency nurse practitioner specialty track and the nation's only emergency medical services nurse practitioner track in the post-master's completion program.

The PhD program offers entry options for nurses with BSN, master's, or DNP degree.

In the Fall 2025 semester, Cizik School of Nursing began offering up to 27 hours of nursing science pre-requisites as a pathway into its accelerated Pacesetters BSN program.

Cizik School of Nursing launched the Future Nurses Fund in the Spring 2026 semester, which makes tuition and required fees free to BSN students who meet financial and academic requirements.

== Practice ==
The school also operates the nurse-led UT Health Services clinic, which specializes in occupational health, travel medicine, and primary care. It provides occupational health care for UTHealth employees and a variety of other companies and organizations throughout the Houston area.

Clinical learning experiences for students are available within other UTHealth Houston schools and in the broader community. Cizik School of Nursing's sister institutions on the Houston campus are McGovern Medical School, UTHealth Houston School of Public Health, UTHealth Houston School of Dentistry, D. Bradley McWilliams School of Biomedical Informatics, MD Anderson Cancer Center UTHealth Houston Graduate School of Biomedical Sciences, and the School of Behavioral Health Sciences.

Affiliate organizations and institutions include UT Physicians, UT MD Anderson Cancer Center, UT Harris County Psychiatric Center, Memorial Hermann, and several other large hospitals and health care systems with locations in the Texas Medical Center and throughout the Houston area. Students also have opportunities for learning experiences in neighborhood health centers, nursing homes, day care centers, city and county health departments, mental health facilities, homeless shelters, and medical offices and clinics.

== Research ==
Faculty and students within Cizik School of Nursing's Department of Research pursue scientific inquiry on a wide range of subjects, including vulnerable and underserved populations, nonpharmaceutical pain management, aging-in-place technology, and tracking and management of disease symptoms. For calendar year 2025, Cizik School of Nursing was ranked 8th nationally among nursing schools with research funded by the National Institutes of Health.

== Leadership ==
Diane M. Santa Maria, DrPH, MSN, RN, was appointed as the fifth dean in the Cizik School of Nursing's history, effective September 1, 2020.
