= McGovern Medical School =

Medical school in Houston, Texas, US

- Former names: University of Texas Medical School at Houston; UTHealth Medical School
- Type: Public Medical school
- Established: 1969
- Parent institution: University of Texas Health Science Center at Houston
- President: Melina R. Kibbe
- Dean: LaTanya J. Love
- Faculty: 1,791
- Students: 1,086
- Postgraduates: 1,226 Residents/Fellows
- Location: Houston, Texas, U.S. 29.71295°N 95.39628°W
- Campus: Urban
- Website: med.uth.edu
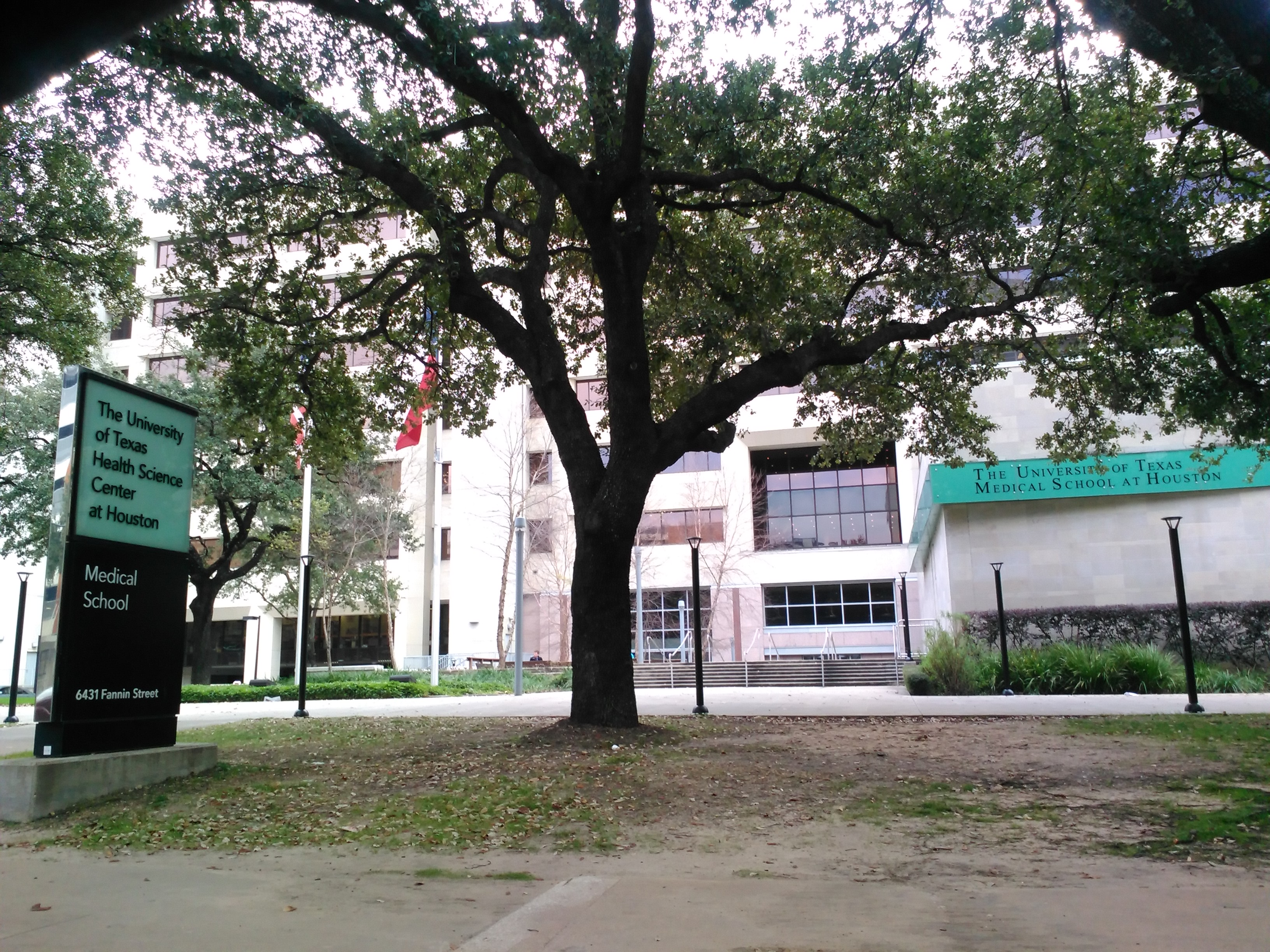

The John P. and Kathrine G. McGovern Medical School, located at the Texas Medical Center in Houston, Texas, United States, is the graduate medical school associated with the University of Texas Health Science Center at Houston (UTHealth Houston). Established by the Texas Legislature in 1969 as the University of Texas Medical School at Houston, the McGovern Medical School enrolled its first class of 19 students in 1970. Today, the school annually enrolls a class size of 240 students, making it the seventh-largest medical school in the United States.

== History ==
In 1968, the University of Texas Board of Regents signed an affiliation agreement with Hermann Hospital for the hospital to become the primary teaching facility for the proposed University of Texas Medical School at Houston. In 1969, the University of Texas Medical School at Houston was simultaneously authorized with the Texas Tech University School of Medicine by the Texas Legislature to address the projected state and national shortages of physicians.

In 1970, Cheves McCord Smythe, MD was appointed the first dean of the medical school. The following year, construction of the John H. Freeman Building begins. In 1972, the school joined the newly formed University of Texas Health Science Center at Houston.

=== Renaming ===
In 2010, the University of Texas System Board of Regents approves a dba for the University of Texas Health Science Center to operate under the name UTHealth. This results in the renaming of the UT Medical School at Houston to the UTHealth Medical School.

In 2015, the school received a $75 million donation from the John P. McGovern Foundation, the largest donation in the university's history. In honor of the gift, the UTHealth Medical School was renamed the John P. and Katherine G. McGovern Medical School.

=== Location ===
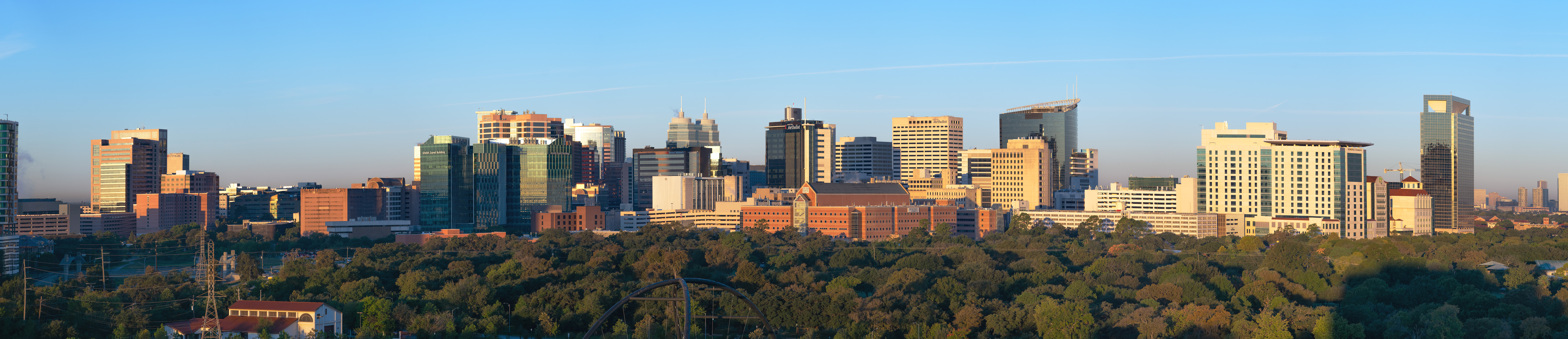
View of the Texas Medical Center from the east. Hermann Park is in the foreground.

The Texas Medical Center is a dense agglomeration of hospitals, schools, and ancillary businesses clustered on a triangular piece of land bordered by Rice University and the neighborhood of Southampton to the west, Brays Bayou to the south and east, and Hermann Park to the north. With over 120,000 employees, the TMC is the largest medical complex in the world. The Texas Medical Center Corporation has compared its dense cityscape to the Chicago Loop and Lower Manhattan.

== Affiliated hospitals, clinics, and research institutes ==
- M.D. Anderson Cancer Center
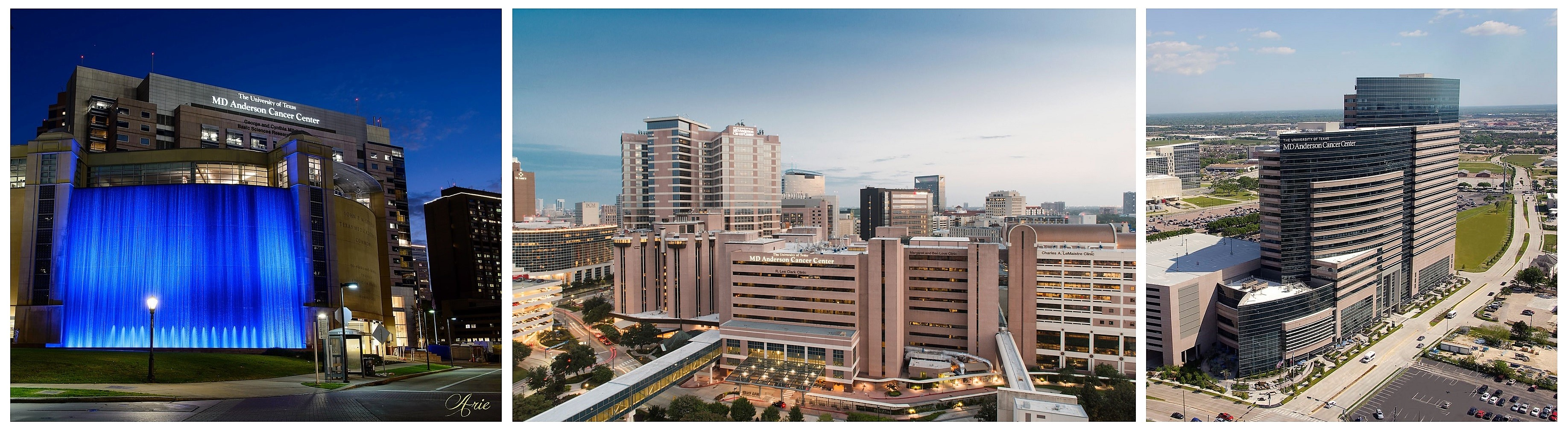
  MD Anderson facilities (Mitchell pavilion; North campus main building and clinics; Mid campus.)
- Memorial Hermann Health System
- Memorial Hermann - Texas Medical Center
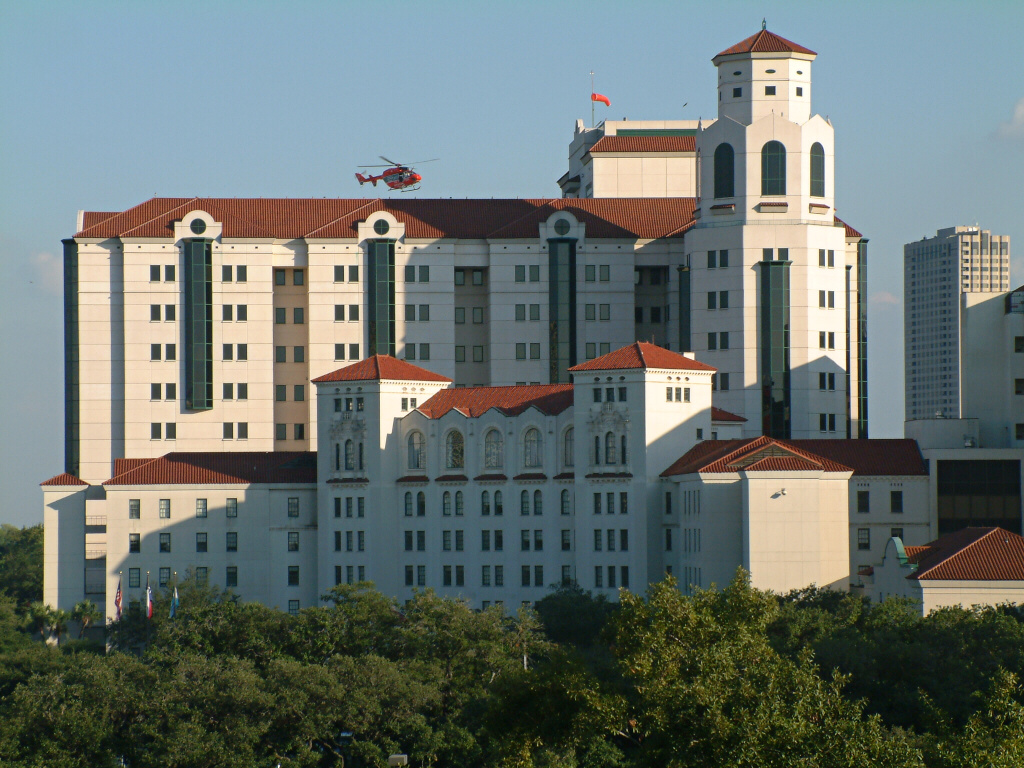
  Memorial Hermann Hospital TMC in 2003
- TIRR Memorial Hermann
- Children's Memorial Hermann Hospital
- Lyndon B. Johnson Hospital
- Dunn Behavioral Sciences Center
- Harris County Psychiatric Center
- St. Joseph Medical Center
- The Robert Cizik Eye Clinic
- UT Physicians

== Academics ==
=== Admissions ===
The admissions process is streamlined through Texas Medical & Dental Schools Application Service (TMDSAS), whereby applicants are ranked by schools at which they interview and then "matched" for final placement to a single Texas medical school of their highest preference.

=== Matriculation statistics ===
- Average GPA: 3.90
- Average MCAT: 513
- Interview rate(s) (in-state and out-of-state applicants): 22% (in-state) 5.7% (out-of-state)
- Acceptance rate: 3.93% :
- Percent of entering class in-state: 95%
- Tuition (in-state and out-of-state applicants): $20,092 (in-state) $29,708 (out-of-state):

=== Dual degree programs ===
Along with the M.D. degree, McGovern Medical School offers options for students to pursue combined degrees and to earn special graduation distinctions. The combined degrees include:

- M.D./Ph.D. It combines dissertation work in an area of biomedical science at The University of Texas MD Anderson Cancer Center UTHealth Houston Graduate School of Biomedical Sciences, leading to the Ph.D., along with clinical studies, leading to the M.D.)
- M.D./M.B.A. (This five-year program in conjunction with University of Houston-Clear Lake focuses on giving future physicians the skills for integrating medicine and business)
- M.D./M.P.H. (McGovern Medical School and UTHealth School of Public Health offer students a university degree in each field at the end of their four-year M.D. program)
- M.D./M.S. (In Clinical Science. This program combines didactic training with a mentored clinical research project. The program concludes with submission and defense of a master's thesis)
- M.D./M.B.E (Master of Bioengineering) In conjecture with Rice University.
- M.D./O.M.F.S.

== Library ==
The Texas Medical Center Library is a health sciences library located in the Texas Medical Center (TMC) in Houston, TX. The TMC Library is the only major medical and scientific library serving the entire 1,345 sq. acre Texas Medical Center (TMC) campus and its non-profit institutions. It offers librarian services, and provides biomedical information for education and research activities to take place, and study space for students for these schools to help maintain their accreditation.

For the past twenty-five years, the TMC Library has been the home site for the National Network of Libraries of Medicine – South Central Region (NN/LM SCR). Through a competitive bid process, the TMC Library has secured the contract from the National Library of Medicine, under the National Institutes of Health.

== Alumni association ==
The McGovern Medical School Alumni Association supports graduates through networking, mentorship, and philanthropy. The association is governed by a Board of Trustees that includes alumni from multiple class years. As of 2025, leadership includes Vivian Porche, MD (Class of 1985) as President, Summer Merritt, MD (Class of 2004) as President-Elect, and Rainer Khetan, MD (Class of 1994) as Past President.

=== Distinguished alumni ===
McGovern Medical School at UTHealth Houston presents the Distinguished Alumnus Award annually to graduates who have made outstanding contributions in medical science, education, clinical care, or service to humanity. The award has been given since 1987.

Notable recent recipients include:

- Pedro Mancias, MD (Class of 1987) — Professor Emeritus of Pediatrics, Distinguished Teaching Professor, and recipient of the Herbert L. and Margaret W. DuPont Master Clinical Teaching Award and the Leonard Tow Humanism in Medicine Award.
- Michael C. Burgess, MD (Class of 1977) — U.S. Representative and physician; recipient of the 2023 Distinguished Alumnus Award.
- Shelby D. Melton, MD (Class of 2004) — Chief of Pathology & Laboratory Medicine Service at VA North Texas and associate professor at UT Southwestern.
- Lemuel M. Arnold, MD (Class of 1977) — Pediatrician specializing in adolescent medicine and long-time mentor to medical students.

=== Other notable alumni ===
- Helen Boucher
- Julie V. Philley
- Richard Walton (American football)
- Serena Auñón-Chancellor, astronaut
- Eddy Furniss, baseball player
- Nancy Dickey

== Notable faculty ==
- James "Red" Duke, Trauma Surgeon
- Denton Cooley
- Anil Menon, Astronaut
- Ferid Murad, 1998 Nobel Prize in Physiology or Medicine winner for his research on nitric oxide as a signaling molecule in the cardiovascular system
- James T. Willerson
- Lex Frieden, disability rights activist
- Ali J. Marian, Cardiologist
- Hazim J. Safi, cardiothoracic surgeon
- Stanley Schultz
- Vasanthi Jayaraman
- Barbara J. Stoll
- Irma Gigli
- Gustavo S. Oderich
- John H. Byrne
- Theresa Koehler
- Bruce C. Kone
- James Langabeer
- Ronald P. Rapini
- Emil Steinberger (endocrinologist)
- Steve Warner
- Herbert L. DuPont

== See also ==
- University of Texas System
