= University of Texas Health Science Center at Houston =

Medical school in Houston, Texas, US

The University of Texas Health Science Center at Houston
- Type: Public academic health science center
- Established: 1972
- Parent institution: University of Texas System
- Endowment: $487.6 million (market value)
- President: Melina R. Kibbe
- Faculty: 2,092
- Administrative staff: 5,259
- Students: 5,241; 1,077 Medical School; 406 Graduate School of Biomedical Sciences; 289 Biomedical Informatics; 565 Dentistry; 1,647 Nursing; 1,257 Public Health
- Location: Houston, Texas, U.S. 29°42′12″N 95°24′10″W
- Campus: Urban; 4.94 million assignable sq. ft^{2}
- Website: www.uth.edu

The University of Texas Health Science Center at Houston (UTHealth Houston) is a public academic health science center in Houston, Texas, United States. It was created in 1972 by The University of Texas System Board of Regents. It is located in the Texas Medical Center, the largest medical center in the world. It is composed of six schools:

- McGovern Medical School
- The University of Texas MD Anderson Cancer Center UTHealth Graduate School of Biomedical Sciences
- UTHealth School of Dentistry
- Cizik School of Nursing
- D. Bradley McWilliams School of Biomedical Informatics
- UTHealth School of Public Health.

== About ==
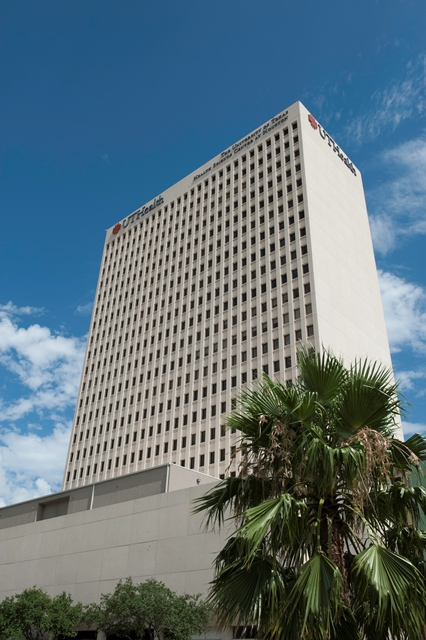
University Center Tower

Established in 1972 by The University of Texas System Board of Regents, The University of Texas Health Science Center at Houston (UTHealth) is Houston's Health University and Texas' resource for health care education, innovation, scientific discovery, and excellence in patient care. The most comprehensive academic health center in The UT System and the U.S. Gulf Coast region, UTHealth is home to schools of biomedical informatics, biomedical sciences, dentistry, medicine, nursing, and public health. UTHealth includes The University of Texas Harris County Psychiatric Center, as well as the following clinical practices: UT Physicians, UT Dentists and UT Health Services. The university's primary teaching hospitals are Memorial Hermann-Texas Medical Center, Children's Memorial Hermann Hospital, and Harris Health Lyndon B. Johnson Hospital. The president of UTHealth is Melina Kibbe, M.D.

== Academics ==
Undergraduate demographics as of Fall 2023
Race and ethnicity	Total
Hispanic	33%
Asian	29%
White	19%
Black	12%
Two or more races	4%
International student	1%
Unknown	1%
Economic diversity
Low-income (Note: The percentage of students who received an income-based federal Pell grant intended for low-income students.)	44%
Affluent (Note: The percentage of students who are a part of the American middle class at the bare minimum.)	56%

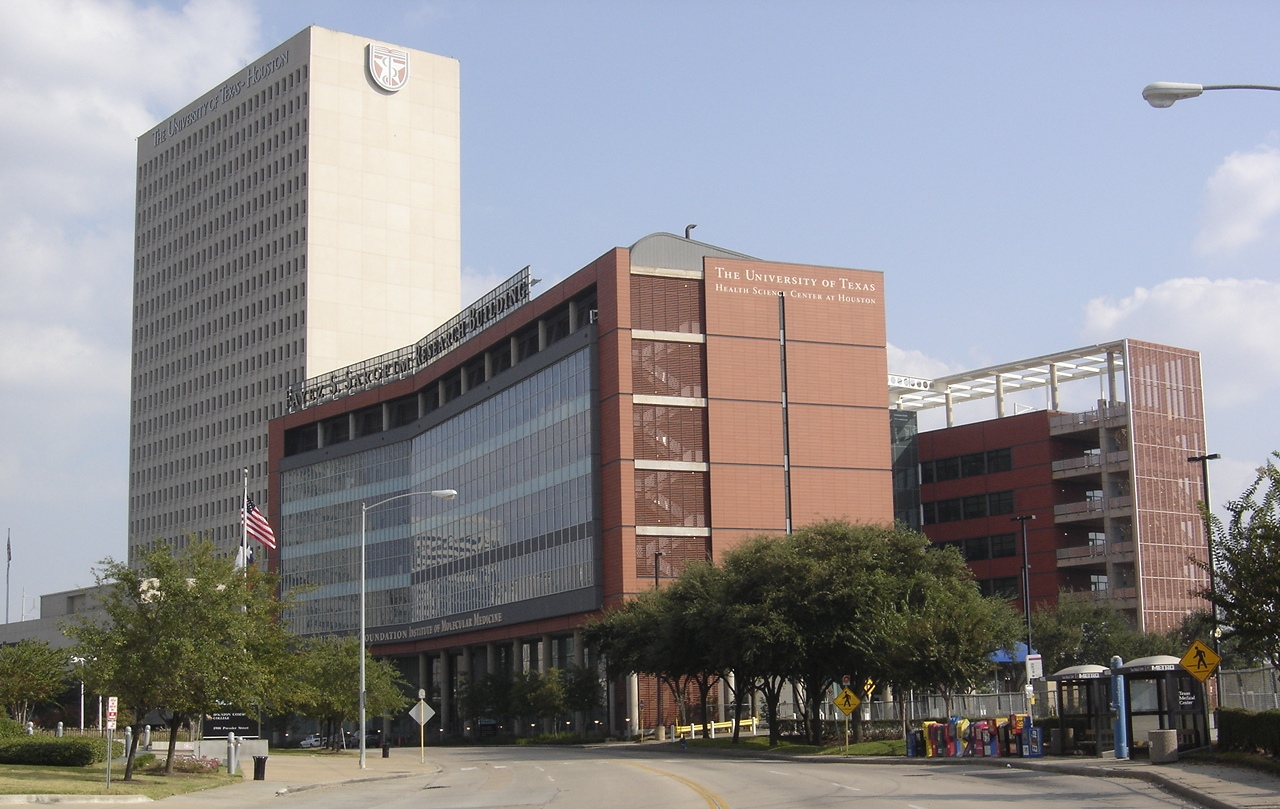

=== John P. and Kathrine G. McGovern Medical School ===
One of the largest medical schools in the United States, John P. and Kathrine G. McGovern Medical School was established by The University of Texas System Board of Regents in 1969 to help shore up the projected state and national shortages of physicians. The school is divided into 23 departments and various specialized research centers.

The school's primary teaching hospitals are Memorial Hermann - Texas Medical Center, Children's Memorial Hermann Hospital and Harris Health Lyndon B. Johnson Hospital. The clinical practice of the school is UT Physicians, one of the nation's largest multi-specialty practices.

On November 23, 2015, UTHealth announced that the UTHealth Medical School had been renamed the John P. and Kathrine G. McGovern Medical School in honor of a $75 million gift from the John P. McGovern Foundation, the largest gift in the university's history.

=== The University of Texas MD Anderson Cancer Center UTHealth Houston Graduate School of Biomedical Sciences ===
In 1962 there was a movement, led by then MD Anderson Hospital president, R. Lee Clark, to establish The University of Texas Graduate School of Biomedical Sciences at Houston. At that time there were 13 predoctoral students studying with scientists at MD Anderson who were enrolled through The University of Texas at Austin. Six MD Anderson scientists were special members, and four students were special associates, in the Graduate School Faculty at Austin. The Graduate School of Biomedical Sciences was established on June 11, 1963, and activated by the Board of Regents of the University of Texas on September 28, 1963.

After a two-year national search to recruit an outstanding scientist as dean of the new school, Paul A. Weiss, was chosen. At the time of his appointment he was 66 and had just retired from the Rockefeller Institute. The Rockefeller graduate program, where the curriculum was interdisciplinary, was the prototype for Weiss' plan for the curriculum. This tradition has been integral to the graduate school's mission. Currently, the deans of the graduate school are Michael Blackburn, and Michelle Barton. In 2017, the school was renamed the University of Texas MD Anderson Cancer Center UTHealth Graduate School of Biomedical Sciences.

=== UTHealth School of Dentistry ===
The UTHealth School of Dentistry offers 10 accredited programs: DDS, dental hygiene, two primary care general residency programs, and specialty programs in endodontics, oral and maxillofacial surgery (OMS), orthodontics, pediatric dentistry, periodontics, and prosthodontics. The dean of UTHealth School of Dentistry is John A. Valenza. The school was founded as Texas Dental College in 1905 and operated as a proprietary school until 1943 when it became part of the University of Texas as the University of Texas School of Dentistry. It was renamed the University of Texas Dental Branch in 1958 and became part of the newly formed University of Texas Health Science Center at Houston in 1972.

Students gain clinical skills at affiliated hospitals, school districts and through community outreach projects. UTHealth School of Dentistry also has off-site clinics: University Dental Center (postgraduate general dentistry), UT Professional Building, 6410 Fannin St., Suite 310; UTHealth Pediatric Dentistry (postgraduate clinic), Houston Medical Center Plaza, 6655 Travis St., Suite 460; UT Oral and Maxillofacial Surgeons, Scurlock Tower, 6560 Fannin St., Suite 1900.

In addition, faculty and students provide dental services inside Texas Children's Health Plan facilities at 700 N. Sam Houston Parkway West in the Greenspoint area and 9700 Bissonnet in Southwest Houston.

=== Jane and Robert Cizik School of Nursing ===
Established in 1972, Jane and Robert Cizik School of Nursing is ranked in the top five percent of graduate nursing programs in the country and is the highest ranked in Texas. Cizik School of Nursing offers programs resulting in a Bachelor of Science in Nursing, Master of Science in Nursing, Doctor of Philosophy in Nursing, Doctor of Nursing Practice degree or a BSN-DNP in Nurse Anesthesia Program. The school also provides a wide variety of settings in which students and faculty can study, conduct research and participate in clinical practice. The dean ad interim is Diane M. Santa Maria, Dr.P.H., M.S.N., R.N., A.P.H.N.-B.C. The school's Student Community Center opened in 2004. The 195,000-sq.-ft. facility has received several local, state and national architectural design awards to date. In November 2017, Jane and Robert Cizik donated $25 million to UTHealth School of Nursing, giving the school the resources and capacity to shape the future of nursing education and health care delivery. In recognition of the Cizik family, the school was renamed the Jane and Robert Cizik School of Nursing at UTHealth.

=== UTHealth School of Public Health ===
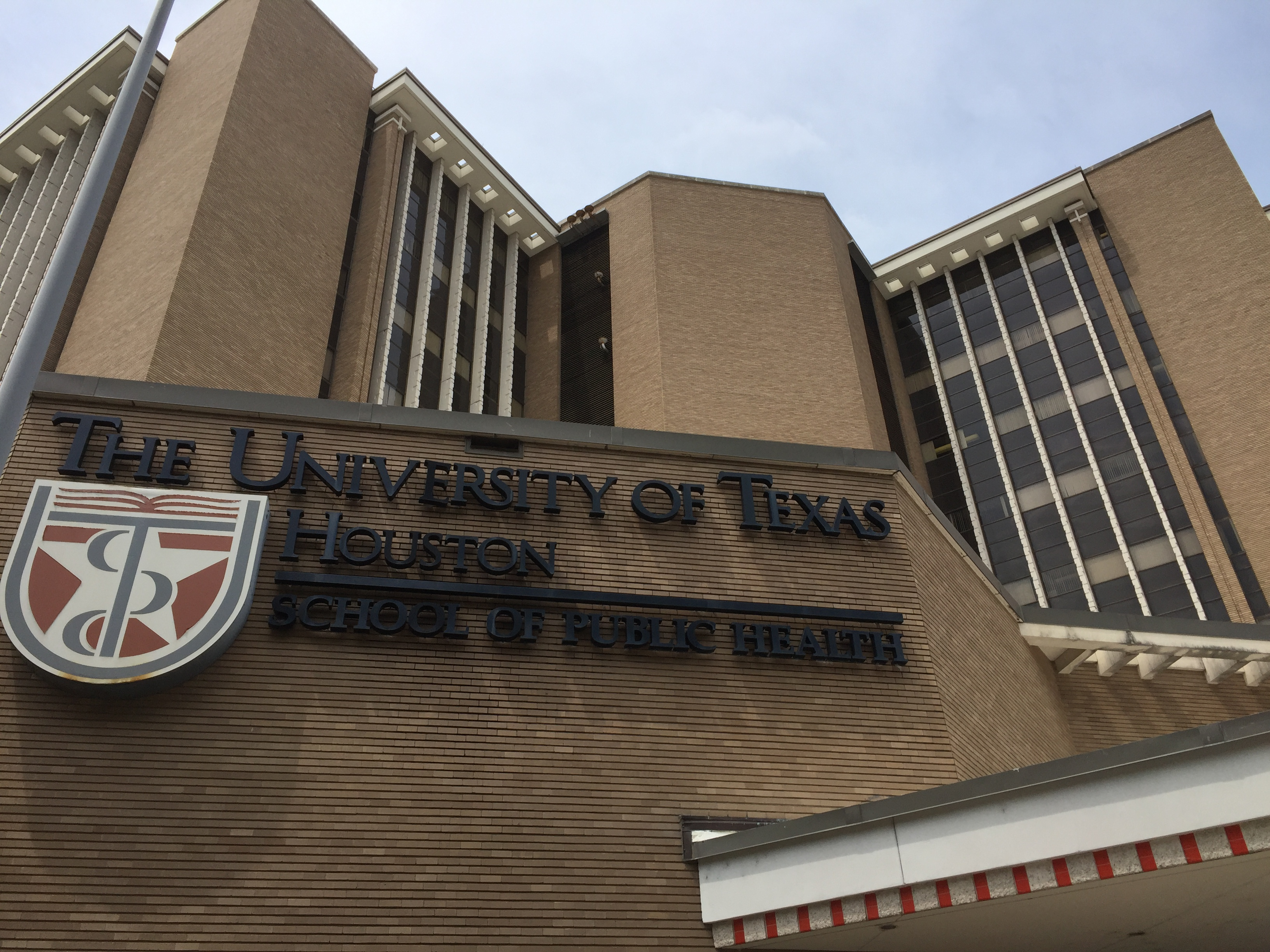
UTHealth School of Public Health in 2018

Following authorization in 1947, the Texas State Legislature first appropriated funds for this school in 1967. The first class was admitted in the fall of 1969, occupying rented and borrowed space. The main campus of the school is located in Houston in the Texas Medical Center. In response to the need for graduate public health education in other geographic areas of the state, UTHealth School of Public Health established regional campuses in San Antonio (1979), El Paso (1992), Dallas (1998), Brownsville (2000) and Austin (2007). Each campus was established to meet the public health education and research needs of its community. The regional campuses have their own resident faculty and on-site course offerings. Interactive video courses originate from and connect all six of the school's campuses. The school has four academic divisions: Biostatistics and Data Science; Epidemiology, Human Genetics and Environmental Sciences; Health Promotion and Behavioral Sciences; and Management, Policy and Community Health; as well as 15 research centers.

UTHealth School of Public Health offers graduate education leading to proficiency in the skills needed for public health careers. The main campus in Houston offers four degree programs: M.P.H., Dr.P.H., M.S. and Ph.D. The regional campuses provide masters- and doctoral-level education to individuals in areas geographically distanced from Houston. This allows faculty and students to target public health issues of particular relevance to the communities in which they are located. The school is accredited by the Council on Education for Public Health (CEPH). The dean is Eric Boerwinkle, Ph.D.

=== UTHealth D. Bradley McWilliams School of Biomedical Informatics ===
UTHealth D. Bradley McWilliams School of Biomedical Informatics (MSBMI), formerly known as the School of Health Information Sciences, was founded in 1972 as the School of Allied Health Sciences and is the newest of the six UTHealth schools. In 1992, UTHealth determined it would focus on graduate education in the health sciences. At that time, the school began to shift from traditional allied health baccalaureate programs toward the development of graduate programs to join the other professional and graduate schools in the university. In 1997, the school created the Department of Health Informatics and began to offer a Master of Science in Health Informatics. In 2001, the school name was changed to the School of Health Information Sciences, which also subsumed all faculty and students in the department. The school offered a Master of Science in Health Informatics, a Doctor of Philosophy in Health Informatics and a certificate program in Health Informatics for non-degree seeking students. In 2010, the school underwent another name change and became UTHealth School of Biomedical Informatics. In 2023, following a visionary investment from attorney D. Bradley "Brad" McWilliams, the school once again changed its name to D. Bradley McWilliams School of Biomedical Informatics. It currently offers certificate programs in health informatics, a Master of Science in Biomedical Informatics with two tracks: a traditional research track and an applied health informatics track; and a Doctor of Philosophy in Health Informatics and dual-degree programs with UTHealth School of Public Health. The dean is Jiajie Zhang.

== Notable faculty ==
- Palmer Beasley
- James "Red" Duke, trauma surgeon and professor at the University of Texas Health Science Center at Houston (UTHealth) and Memorial Hermann-Texas Medical Center, where he worked on-site since 1972
- Lex Frieden, disability rights activist
- Millicent Goldschmidt, microbiologist
- Ali J. Marian, Cardiologist
- Ferid Murad, 1998 Nobel Prize in Physiology or Medicine winner for his research on nitric oxide as a signaling molecule in the cardiovascular system
- Hazim J. Safi, cardiothoracic surgeon
- Stanley Schultz

== University housing ==
The university has three student housing properties, one at 7900 Cambridge (Phase I) and two at 1885 El Paseo (Phase II and III). The student housing on Cambridge, a two-story complex, was built in 1982 and includes the Child Development Center. The Phase II housing on El Paseo, a four-story complex, was built in 2005, and the Phase III complex at the same location was built in 2014.

Minor dependent residents of both complexes are zoned to the Houston Independent School District. Residents of both complexes are zoned to Whidby Elementary School, Cullen Middle School, and Lamar High School.

== Research centers and institutes ==
UTHealth has several centers and institutes whose work aligns with the university's mission of education, research and clinical care.

- Bioinformatics & High Performance Computing Service Center
- Center for Advanced Heart Failure
- Center for Antimicrobial Resistance and Microbial Genomics (CARMiG)
- Center for Behavioral Health Equity and Outcomes Research
- Center for Biomedical Engineering
- Center for Cardiovascular Biology & Atherosclerosis Research
- Center for Clinical & Translational Sciences (CCTS)
- Center for Clinical Research & Evidence Based Medicine
- Center for Health Promotion & Prevention Research
- Center for Health Services Research
- Center for Healthcare Quality & Safety
- Center for Human Development Research
- Center for Infectious Diseases
- Center for Innovation Generation
- Center for Laboratory Animal Medicine & Care
- Center for Membrane Biology
- Center for Neurobehavioral Research on Addiction
- Center for Nursing Research
- Center for Pediatric Population Health
- Center for Substance Abuse Education & Research
- Center for Surgical Trials & Evidence-Based Practice (C-STEP)
- Center for Translational Injury Research
- Center of Excellence on Mood Disorders
- Center on Aging
- Chemical Immunology Research Center
- Children's Learning Institute
- Clinical Trials Resource Center (CTRC)
- Consortium on Aging
- Cooley Life Center
- Coordinating Center for Clinical Trials
- Dan L Duncan Children's Neurodevelopmental Clinic (part of the Children's Learning Institute)
- George McMillan Fleming Center for Healthcare Management
- Gulf Coast Consortia
- Gulf States Hemophilia & Thrombophilia Center
- Hispanic Health Disparities Research Center
- Hispanic Health Research Center
- Houston Center for Biomaterials & Biomimetics
- Human Genetics Center
- Institute for Health Policy
- John P. McGovern, MD, Center for Humanities & Ethics
- John Ritter Research Program
- Keck Center for the Neurobiology of Learning & Memory
- Michael & Susan Dell Center for Healthy Living
- Neuroscience Research Center
- Southwest Center for Occupational & Environmental Health
- Surgical & Clinical Skills Center
- Texas Medical Center Digestive Diseases Center
- The Brown Foundation Institute of Molecular Medicine for the Prevention of Human Diseases
- The University of Texas Prevention Research Center
- Turner Syndrome Adult Comprehensive Care Center
- Weatherhead PET Imaging Center

== See also ==
- The University of Texas System
- Texas Medical Center
