= Memorial Hermann Health System =

World renowned hospital in Houston Texas

Coordinates: 29.7829°N 95.5441°W

- Type: Nonprofit organization
- Founded: 1907
- Headquarters: Houston, United States
- Area served: Houston, Texas
- Website: www.memorialhermann.org

Memorial Hermann Health System is the largest not-for-profit health system in southeast Texas and consists of 17 hospitals, 8 Cancer Centers, 3 Heart & Vascular Institutes, and 27 sports medicine and rehabilitation centers, in addition to other outpatient and rehabilitation centers. It was formed in the late 1900s when the Memorial and Hermann systems joined. Both the Memorial and Hermann health care systems started in the early 1900s. The administration is housed in the new Memorial Hermann Tower, along with the existing System Services Tower (formerly called the North Tower), of the Memorial Hermann Memorial City Medical Center.

Memorial Hermann–Texas Medical Center (formerly known as Hermann Hospital before the 1997 merger with Memorial Health Care System) was opened in 1925. It was the first of two hospitals with a Level I trauma center rating to be located in Houston, inside the Texas Medical Center. It is also the primary teaching hospital of McGovern Medical School. It (with Children's Memorial Hermann Hospital) is the flagship of a large system of hospitals and clinics located in and around the greater Houston area, in various neighborhoods as well as some suburbs. The different hospitals are distinguished by further designation indicating their location. (Texas Medical Center, Northwest, Southwest, Woodlands, etc.) The hospital system has been headed by some of the most influential leaders in healthcare including Dan Wolterman, Dr. Benjamin K. Chu as well as the current President & CEO David L. Callender, MD

== History ==
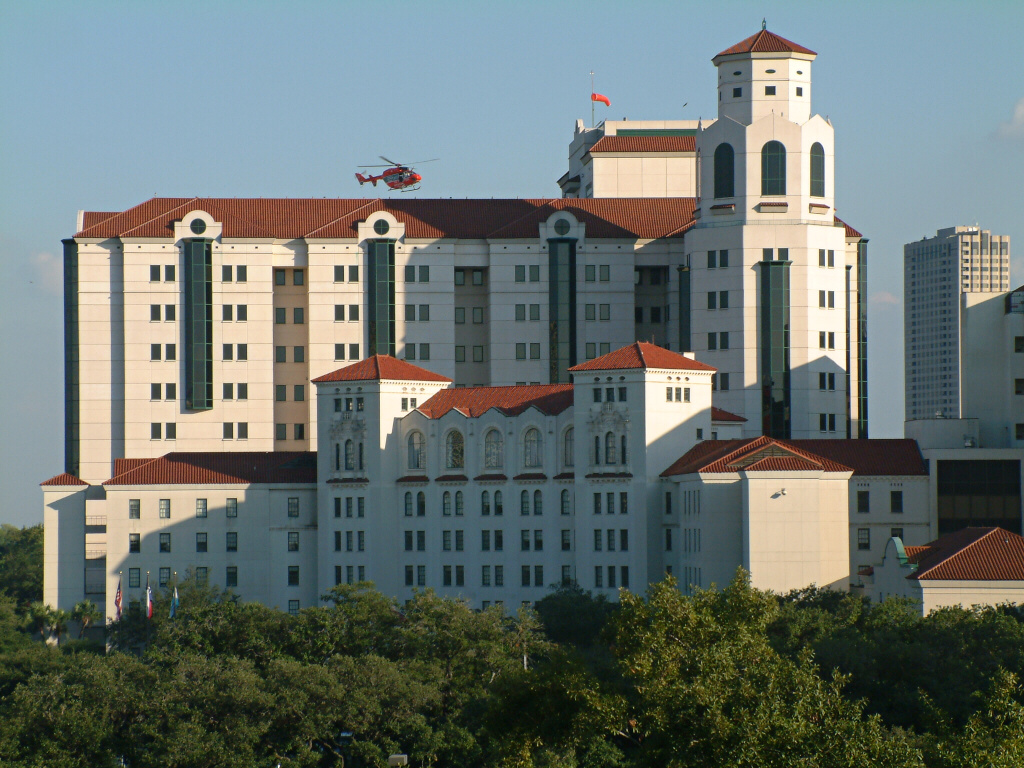
Memorial Hermann Hospital TMC in 2003

The Memorial Hospital System was started in 1907 by The Rev. Dennis Pevoto who purchased an 18-bed sanitarium in downtown Houston, calling it the Baptist Sanatorium. By the time he retired, it had become Memorial Hospital System, a 200-bed facility. Prominent local businessman George H. Hermann died in 1914, leaving a large portion of his $2.6 million estate for building and maintaining a hospital for the poor and sick of Houston. The City of Houston annexed the site of Hermann Hospital in 1922, adding about 1,000 acres (400 ha) of land to the city limits. Hermann Hospital opened its doors in 1925, it also started a school of nursing that same year.

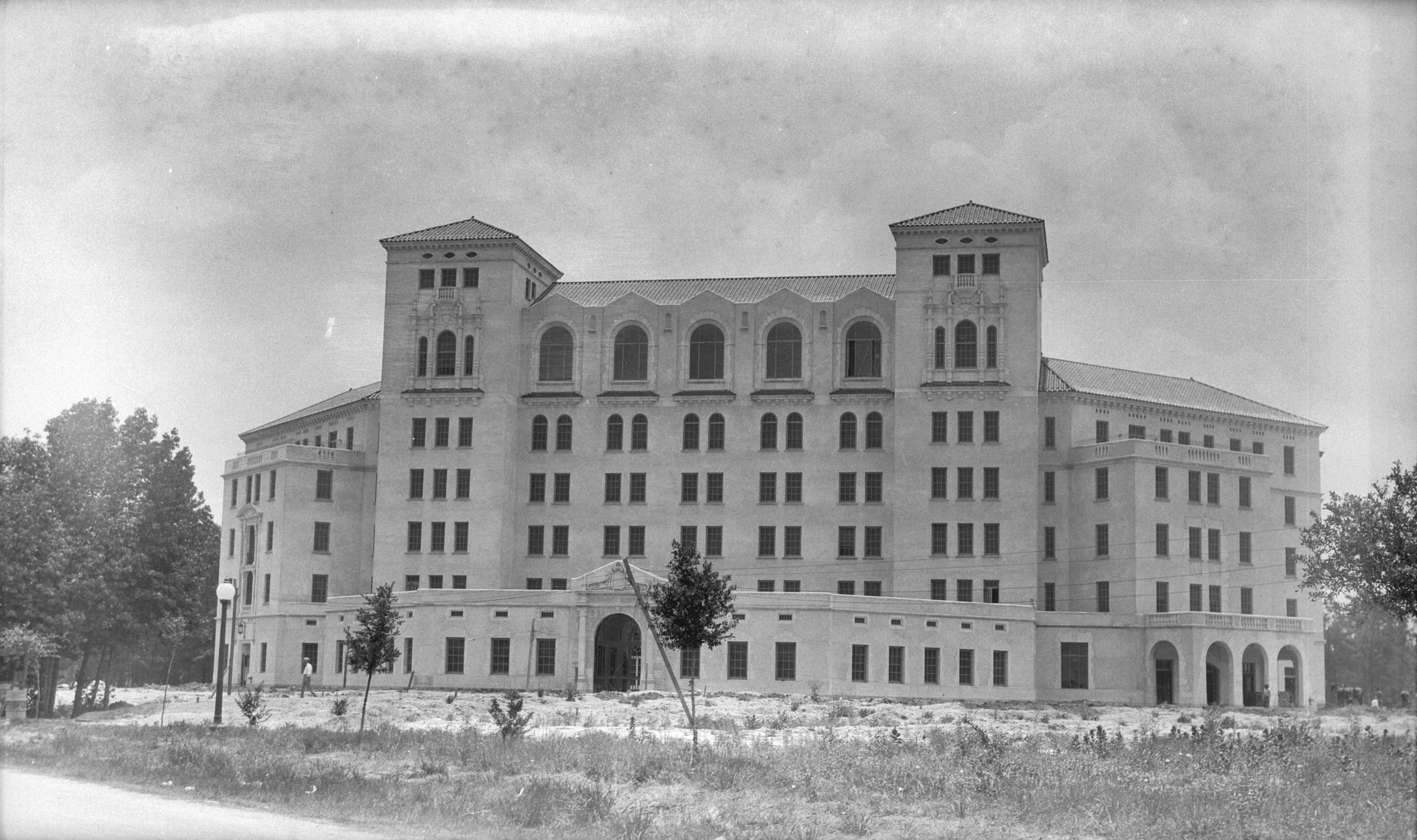
Hermann Hospital in the 1920s

Hermann Hospital was the first to operate in the neighborhood which later became the Texas Medical Center. In 1943 this hospital was the first in Texas to receive a shipment of the new wonder drug, penicillin. In 1946 it was also the first hospital to perform a cardiac catheterization. It remains the only hospital in the Houston area to have a burn-treatment center.

The flagship Texas Medical Center hospital is home to Memorial Hermann Life Flight, an emergency and critical-care-transport aeromedical service. Founded in 1976, LifeFlight was the first aeromedical service in Texas, and second in the United States. It transports around 3,000 patients annually. In 1985 the first successful liver transplant occurred here as well. In 1992 it was also the first hospital in the nation to perform a living-donor transplant on a neonatal patient.

In 1993 Memorial Hermann - Texas Medical Center acquired the region's first Gamma Knife. The first four-organ transplant in Houston also was performed here in 2006, along with it being the first hospital in the world to perform robotic re-constructive aortic surgery.

Hermann Hospital and the Memorial Healthcare System, which at the time had five hospitals, merged in 1997. The "Memorial Hermann" name was first used on November 4, 1997 after the Hermann Healthcare System and Memorial Healthcare System completed their merger, becoming the largest not-for-profit health care system in the nation.

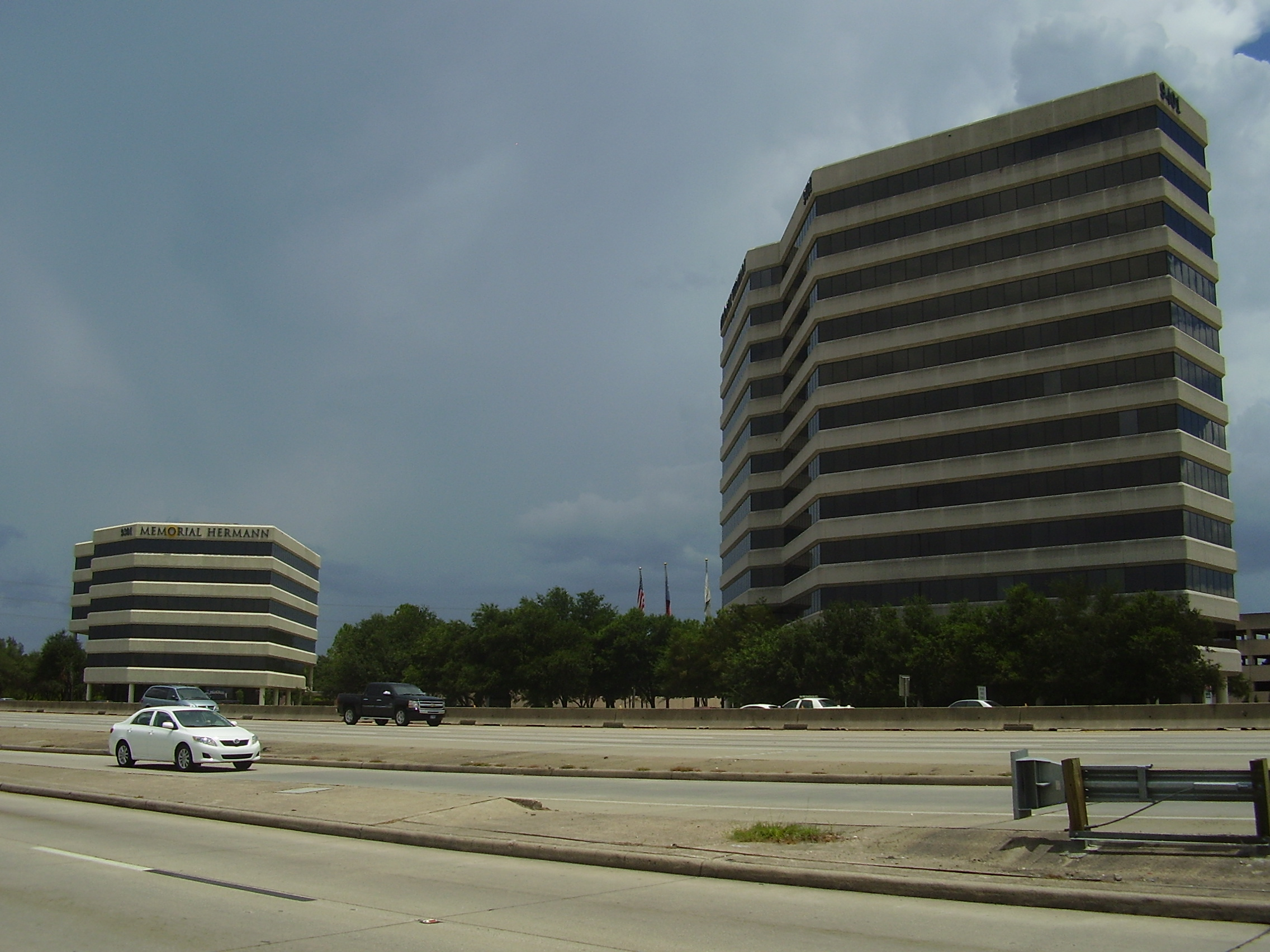
Former Memorial Hermann Healthcare System offices in Greater Sharpstown

In August 2009 Memorial Hermann Hospital announced that it planned to sell its Southwest Hospital in Greater Sharpstown to the Harris County Hospital District, with plans to make the hospital its third general hospital. However, the county withdrew its bid in September 2009. Memorial Hermann has since made efforts to rebuild the Southwest Hospital.

== Awards ==
=== Healthgrades America's 50 Best Hospitals ===
Memorial Hermann Northwest Hospital, Memorial Hermann Southeast Hospital, Memorial Hermann Southwest Hospital, and Memorial Hermann The Woodlands Hospital were collectively named an America's 50 Best Hospital in 2010 and 2011 by HealthGrades.

=== Thomson Reuters 100 Top Hospitals ===
Six Memorial Hermann hospitals were named among the nation's 100 Top Hospitals by Thomson Reuters in 2011. Memorial Hermann's hospitals were the only ones in the Houston-area to earn the recognition.

Collectively, Memorial Hermann Southwest Hospital, Memorial Hermann Southeast Hospital, Memorial Hermann Northwest Hospital and Memorial Hermann The Woodlands Hospital were awarded in the teaching hospitals category. Memorial Hermann Katy Hospital was recognized in the medium community hospitals category in 2010 and 2011. Memorial Hermann Sugar Land Hospital was awarded in the small community hospitals category for the first time in 2011.

The management Services program of Memorial Hermann Healthcare System won the 2011 Franklin Award of Distinction.

== Locations ==
=== Headquarters ===
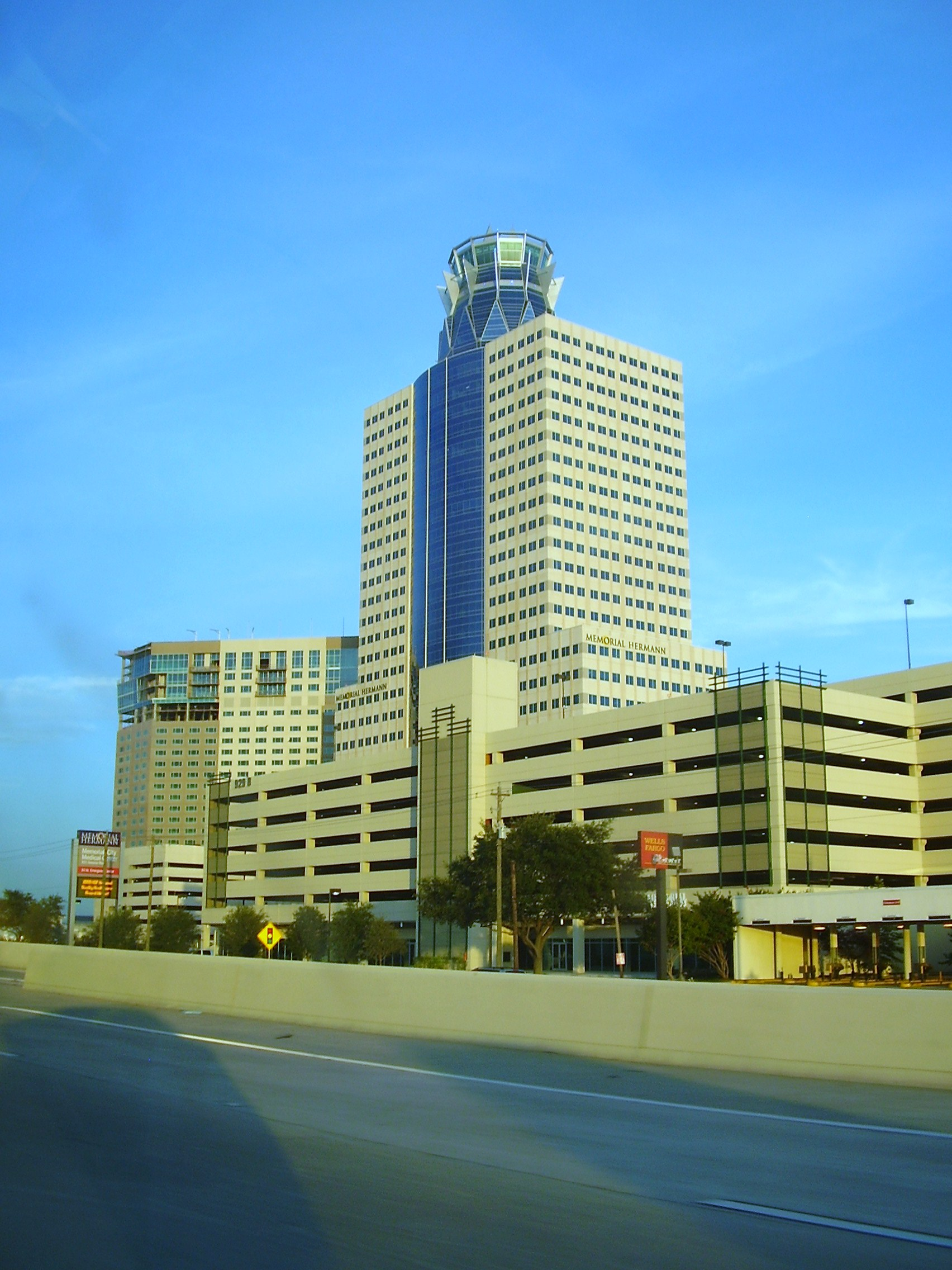
The Memorial Hermann Tower of the Memorial Hermann Memorial City Medical Center houses the system administrative headquarters

The administrative headquarters of the health care system are located in the 915,000 square feet (85,000 m^{2}) Memorial Hermann Tower in the Memorial Hermann Memorial City Medical Center, at the corner of Interstate 10 and Gessner Road. The headquarters were scheduled to move there in mid-2010. The new Memorial Hermann Tower building and the renovated North Tower in the Memorial City hospital have a total of 375,000 square feet (34,800 m^{2}) of space. In 2006 Marshall Heins, the system's vice president of construction, real estate and support services, said that the Memorial City location was chosen as the system headquarters because "The Memorial City area happens to be the geographic hub of Houston as well as the Memorial Hermann Healthcare System. All our facilities are easy to get to on Beltway 8, so we wanted a location that was close to it."

Previously the headquarters were in a facility on Interstate 69/U.S. Highway 59 (Southwest Freeway) at Bissonnet, in Greater Sharpstown. Memorial Hermann leased office space in two office buildings, 9301 Southwest Freeway and 9401 Southwest Freeway. The two buildings had a combined space of 300,000 square feet (28,000 m^{2}). As of 2006 the headquarters had 1,300 employees. The 9401 Southwest Freeway building, also known as the Williamstown Office Tower, previously housed TexCon Petroleum Co. and became vacant several years prior to 1997 when TexCon vacated the space. 9401 Southwest Freeway has 214,000 square feet (19,900 m^{2}) of space and, as of 2009, was owned by the Los Altos, California company Investment Grade Loans. Moody Rambin Interests is the leasing agent of the building as of 2009. 9301 Southwest Freeway has 111,000 square feet (10,300 m^{2}) of space. As of 2009 BGK of Texas owns 9301 Southwest Freeway, and that year Moody Rambin Interests became the leasing company.

On July 9, 2010 the hospital system entered into a lease for over 800,000 square feet (74,000 m^{2}) of office space with MetroNational Corp., involving the former North Tower and the Medical Office Buildings 1–4 on the Memorial City campus. The hospital system continued to use Transwestern to handle the leasing and management.

=== Hospitals ===
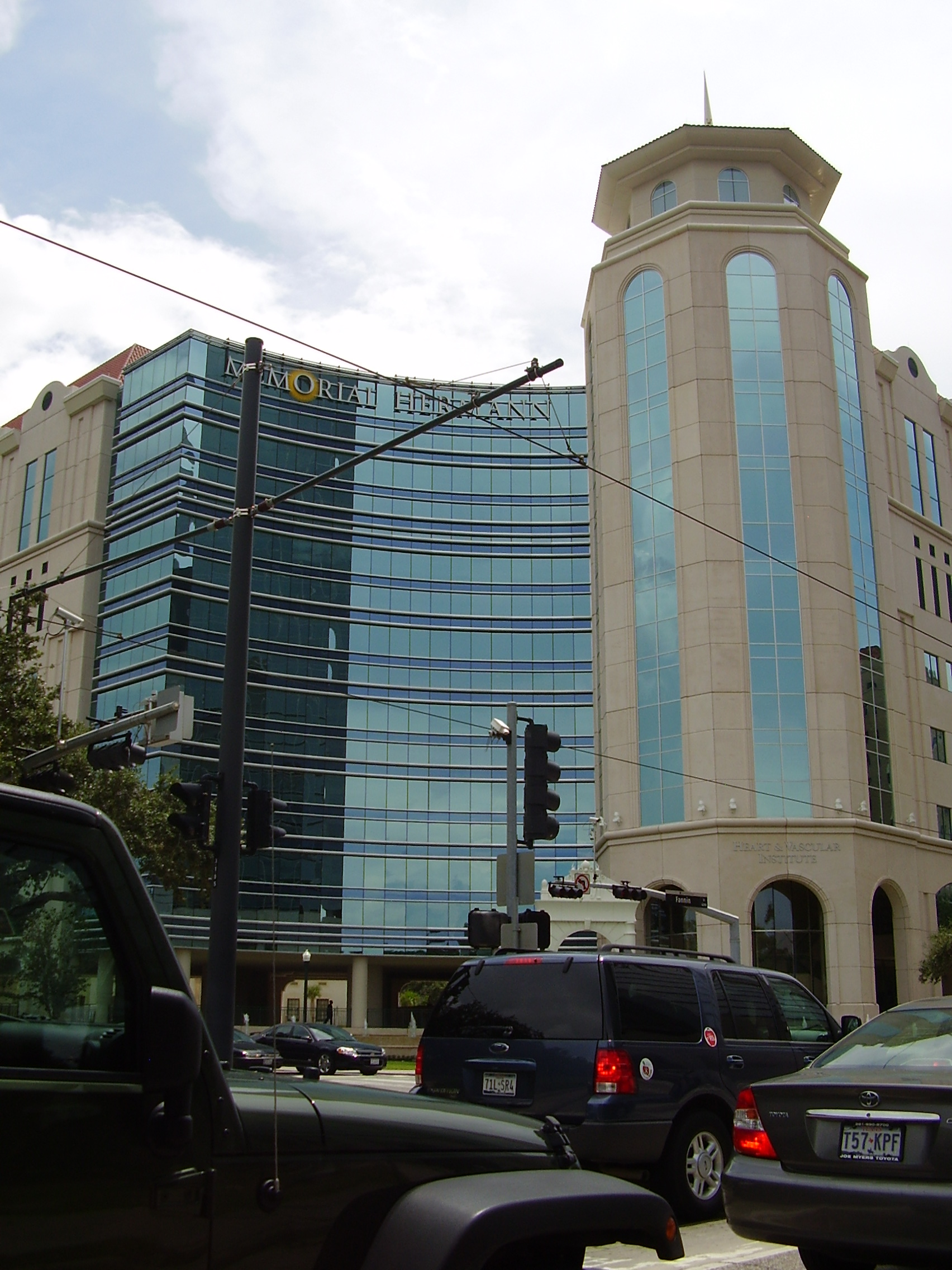
Memorial Hermann-Texas Medical Center Hospital

The locations of the hospital system include:

- Memorial Hermann-Texas Medical Center (Houston)
- Children's Memorial Hermann (Houston)
- Memorial Hermann Katy Hospital, (unincorporated Harris County) - Located east of the city of Katy
- Memorial Hermann Memorial City Medical Center, (Houston)
- Memorial Hermann Northeast Hospital, (Humble)
- Memorial Hermann Northwest also known as Greater Heights Hospital, (Houston)
- Memorial Hermann Southeast Hospital, (Houston)
- Memorial Hermann Southwest Hospital, (Houston)
- Memorial Hermann Sugar Land Hospital, (unincorporated Fort Bend County) - Located southwest of the city of Sugar Land
- Memorial Hermann The Woodlands Medical Center, (The Woodlands community, Shenandoah)
- TIRR Memorial Hermann Rehabilitation Hospital, (Houston)
- Memorial Hermann Orthopedic and Spine Hospital, (Bellaire)
- Memorial Hermann Prevention and Recovery Center (PaRC) Drug and Alcohol Treatment Center (Houston)
- Memorial Hermann Pearland Hospital, (Pearland)
- Memorial Hermann Cypress Hospital, (Cypress)
- Memorial Hermann Urgent Care (Houston, Spring, Sugar Land, Friendswood)
