= Louise McCullough =

American neurologist

Louise McCullough is an American neurologist who is the Prof. Roy M. & Phyllis Gough Huffington Distinguished Chair of Neurology and is actively engaged in stroke research at the University of Texas Health Science Center in Houston, Texas (a.k.a. McGovern Medical School). She provides neurological care at Memorial Hermann Hospital, which has a state-of-the-art stroke center and is co-director of the Mischer Neuroscience Institute.

== Education ==
McCullough received an MD-PhD in neuroscience from the University of Connecticut. She continued her training as an intern and later neurology resident at Johns Hopkins University from 1996-2000, followed by a fellowship in cerebrovascular disease.

== Career ==
McCullough began her career at Johns Hopkins School of Medicine, where she was an instructor and assistant professor in neurology. She relocated to UConn Health in 2004 and progressed to professor of neurology and neuroscience and director of stroke research at Hartford Hospital. She also received a Health Center Teaching and Faculty Award for excellence in teaching basic medical sciences.

In 2015, McCullough moved to UT Health and later became the Prof. Roy M. & Phyllis Gough Huffington Distinguished Chair of Neurology. In 2018, McCullough was inducted into the Johns Hopkins Society of Scholars for excelling in her career since her training at the university. McCullough also serves as the Program Chair of the International Stroke Conference. She also received the Javits Neuroscience Investigator Award from the National Institute of Neurological Disorders and Stroke in 2017 and the C. Miller Fisher, MD Neuroscience Visionary Award from the American Heart Association/American Stroke Association (AHA/ASA) in 2021.

== Research ==
McCullough’s research focuses on ischemic stroke. Because women tend to do worse than men in terms of survival and disability, she is studying the role that hormones play in stroke risk and recovery. McCullough's work was instrumental in the development of the National Institutes of Health's requirement to include female animals in basic and translational studies.

She recently received funding to apply her studies of sex differences towards improving understanding of COVID-19 outcomes.
