= Memorial Hermann Katy Hospital =

Hospital in Texas USA, founded 1980s

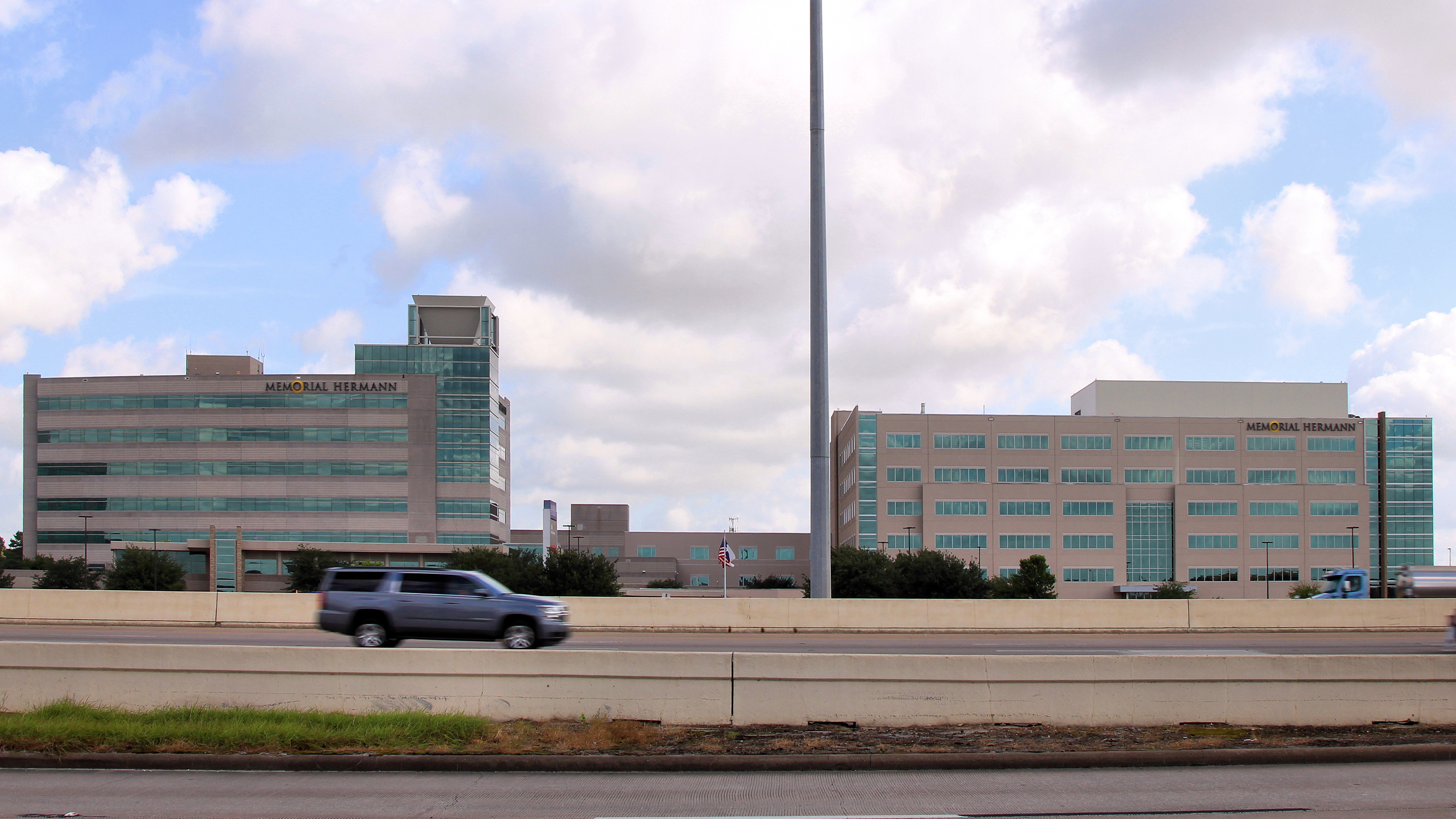

Geography
- Location: Harris County, Texas, near Katy, Greater Houston, Texas, United States
- Coordinates: 29.7875°N 95.7863°W

History
- Opened: 1980s

Links
- Website: www.memorialhermann.org/locations/katy/
- Lists: Hospitals in Texas

Memorial Hermann Katy Hospital is a hospital in unincorporated Harris County, Texas, near Katy and in Greater Houston. It is a part of the Memorial Hermann Healthcare System. Pediatric care to the hospital is provided by doctors from Children's Memorial Hermann Hospital which treats infants, children, teens, and young adults age 0-21.

== History ==
The hospital was established in the 1980s. In 1999 Memorial Hermann acquired the hospital.

In 1999 Memorial Hermann Hospital purchased a plot of land from HCA Inc. It established the Katy Hospital there. The hospital, licensed for 118 beds, was on Pin Oak Road in Katy, west of Katy Mills Mall. The hospital there had 100,000 square feet (9,300 m^{2}) of space. In 2005 the hospital system put the ex-HCA land and the campus on it for sale. A daylong move to the new $98 million facility occurred on Saturday December 9, 2006. The current hospital has about 300,000 square feet (28,000 m^{2}) of space.

In October 2013 the hospital held a groundbreaking for a 100,000-square-foot (9,300 m^{2}) patient tower. Construction of the facility, with an estimated cost of $70 million began in early 2014, and began accommodating patients in January 2016. It has increased the hospital's bed count from 144 to over 200. The new tower has a larger ICU and IMU, new laboratory facilities, has increased number of surgical suits, a Level III NICU, a new cardiac catheterization lab, additional office space, and room for approximately 80 more patient care rooms.

Professional building 2 was constructed in 2014/15 and was completed in the fall of 2015.
