= Memorial Hermann–Texas Medical Center =

Coordinates: 29°42′48″N 95°23′45″W

- Memorial Hermann Health System
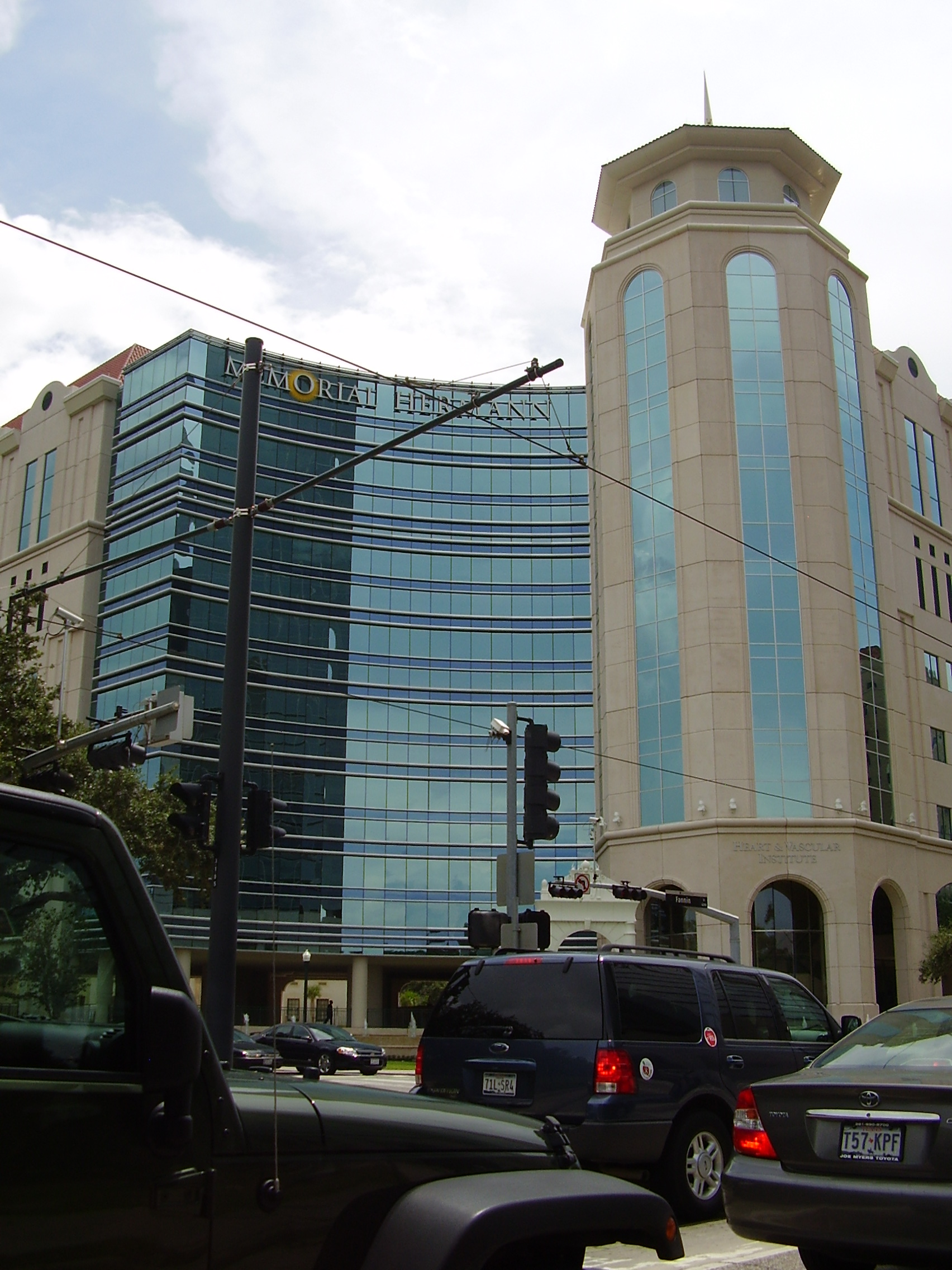

Geography
- Location: Texas Medical Center, Houston, Texas, United States

Organization
- Care system: Not-for-profit
- Type: General and Teaching Hospital
- Affiliated university: University of Texas Health Science Center at Houston

Services
- Emergency department: Level I trauma center
- Beds: 1,104

Helipads
- Helipad: FAA LID: 38TE
| Number | Length | | Surface |
| Number | ft | m | Surface |
|---|---|---|---|
| H1 | 150 | 46 | Concrete |

History
- Founded: 1907
- Opened: 1925

Links
- Website: memorialhermann.org/locations/texas-medical-center
- Lists: Hospitals in Texas

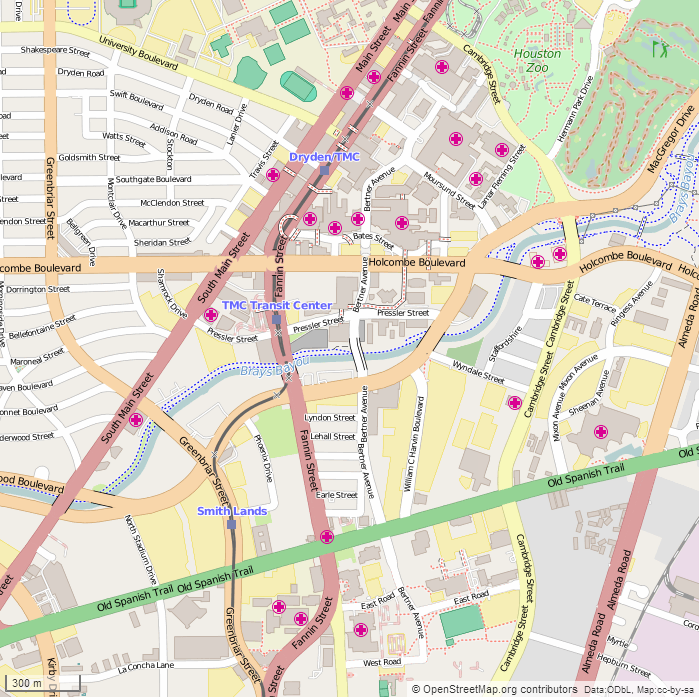
Location within Texas Medical Center

Memorial Hermann–Texas Medical Center is a hospital located at Texas Medical Center neighborhood in Houston, Texas. It is affiliated with the Memorial Hermann Health System.

It is the first hospital founded at the neighborhood of Texas Medical Center (and its founding predates the Texas Medical Center). Founded in 1925, it is the primary teaching hospital for McGovern Medical School (formerly The University of Texas Medical School at Houston (UTHealth Medical School)) and the flagship location of 13 hospitals in the Memorial Hermann Healthcare System. It is one of three certified Level I Trauma Centers in the greater Houston area. The Memorial Hermann Life Flight air ambulance service operates its fleet of helicopters from Memorial Hermann–Texas Medical Center. Pediatric care to the hospital is provided by Children's Memorial Hermann Hospital which treats infants, children, teens, and young adults age 0-21.

== Leadership ==
Brian Dean was named CEO of Memorial Hermann–Texas Medical Center in 2015. Previously, he was the CFO for Memorial Hermann–Texas Medical Center.

== Hospitals and Institutes ==
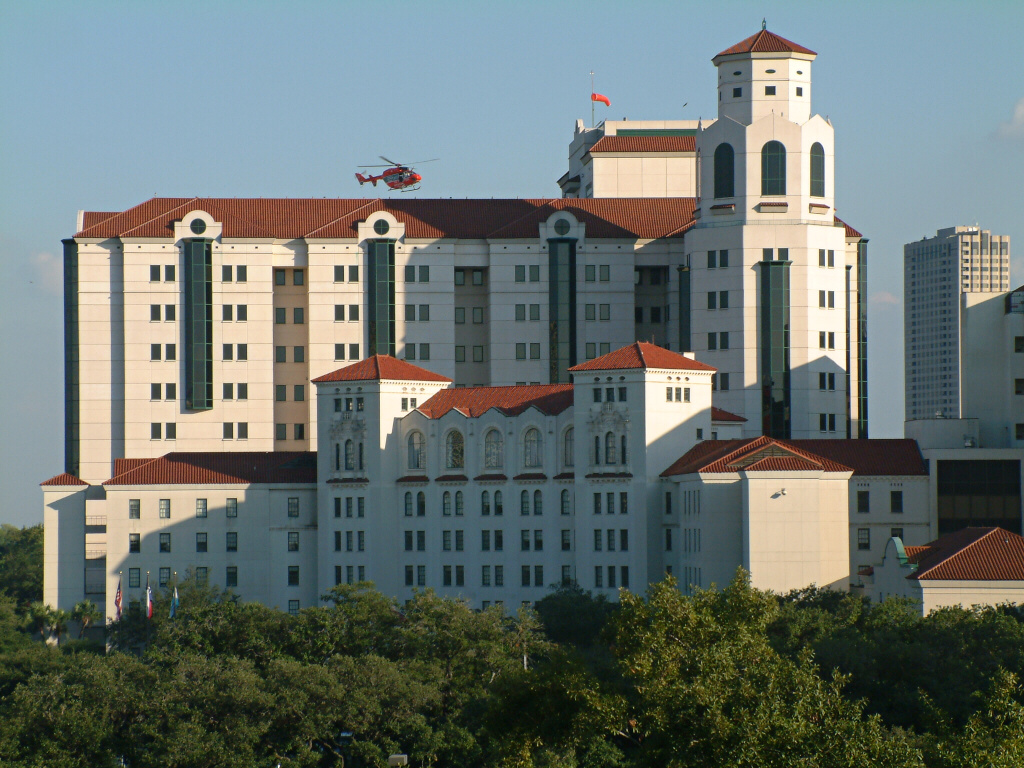
Memorial Hermann Hospital TMC in 2003

The Memorial Hermann–Texas Medical Center campus hosts the main Texas Medical Center Hospital along with Children's Memorial Hermann Hospital. TIRR Memorial Hermann rehabilitation hospital is also located in the Texas Medical Center. The campus houses four institutes: the Heart & Vascular Institute, the Mischer Neuroscience Institute, the Texas Trauma Institute and the Memorial Hermann IRONMAN Sports Medicine Institute.

It is the only hospital in Houston with Burn Center Verification by the American Burn Association.

The hospital founded Life Flight in 1976 as the first air ambulance service in Texas; today, Life Flight is the only hospital-based air ambulance serving Houston and surrounding communities.

Physicians affiliated with the hospital performed the first successful liver transplant in Houston and were the first in the nation to perform a living-donor transplant on a neonatal patient.

The campus has 1,104 licensed beds:

- Children's: 278
- Women's: 68
- Heart & Vascular Institute: 147
- Adult: 589

=== Children's Memorial Hermann Hospital ===
Children's Memorial Hermann Hospital is located inside Memorial Hermann–Texas Medical Center and is a member institution of the National Association of Children's Hospitals and Related Institutions. It houses one of the nation's largest neonatal intensive care units (NICUs) and is one of only two Level IV NICUs in Southeast Texas. The NICU at Children's Memorial Hermann treats more than 1,000 premature infants each year.

The hospital is nationally recognized for The Fetal Center, a subspecialty center made up of maternal-fetal medicine specialists that perform in utero surgery to treat fetuses with birth defects inside the mother's womb before they are born. Affiliated physicians performed the first in utero spina bifida surgery in Texas after the MOMS trial, an NICHD-sponsored study of prenatal and postnatal closure of myelomeningocele.

=== Memorial Hermann Heart & Vascular Institute ===
The Memorial Hermann Heart & Vascular Institute, the only freestanding heart hospital in the Texas Medical Center, is an eight-floor, 1,650,000-square-foot (153,000 m^{2}) building.

=== Mischer Neuroscience Institute ===
The Mischer Neuroscience Institute provides specialized treatment for diseases of the brain and spine. The institute was the first center in Texas and one of only a few institutions in the country to fully integrate neurology, neurosurgery, neuroradiology and neurorehabilitation. The institute has 140 neuro beds and five dedicated operating rooms

It was the first neurosurgery center in Texas to offer microsurgery, interventional neuroradiology/endovascular surgery and gamma knife radiosurgery.

Led by Medical Director Dr. Dong Kim and Co-Medical Director Dr. Louise McCullough, the Mischer Neuroscience Institute is a collaboration between UTHealth and Memorial Hermann–Texas Medical Center. Dr. James Grotta was principal investigator in Houston for the first major trial showing benefits of clot-busting drug tissue plasminogen activator (tPA). The 1995 paper announcing the results of the trial, titled "Tissue Plasminogen Activator for Acute Ischemic Stroke," was voted one of the top nine papers in the 200-year history of the New England Journal of Medicine in 2012.

In 2013, the Mischer Neuroscience Institute was recognized by The Joint Commission and the American Heart Association/American Stroke Association with Advanced Certification for Comprehensive Stroke Centers.

=== TIRR Memorial Hermann ===
TIRR Memorial Hermann is a 119-bed rehabilitation hospital, rehabilitation and research center, outpatient medical clinic and network of outpatient rehabilitation centers in Houston, Texas that offers physical rehabilitation to patients following traumatic brain or spinal injury or to those suffering from neurologic illnesses. In 2012, U.S. News & World Report named TIRR Memorial Hermann to the list of America's Best Hospitals for the 23rd consecutive time.

== Rankings ==
In 2010, Memorial Hermann–Texas Medical Center was ranked in 4 adult and 1 pediatric specialties by the U.S. News & World Report. It was ranked #30 in Kidney Disorders, #38 in Gynecology, #46 in Heart & Heart Surgery, #48 in Urology, and #30 in Pediatrics: Kidney Disorders.

== Transportation ==
Memorial Hermann is served by the Memorial Hermann Hospital-Houston Zoo Station of the METRORail Red Line. Nearby airports with commercial airline service include Houston Hobby and George Bush Intercontinental Airport.
