= James "Red" Duke =

American physician (1928–2015)

James Henry "Red" Duke, Jr. (November 16, 1928 – August 25, 2015) was a trauma surgeon and professor at The University of Texas Health Science Center at Houston, where he worked on-site since 1972. He was instrumental in introducing Memorial Hermann's Life Flight program and bringing a level I trauma center to Houston.

Duke had a nationally syndicated television spot called Texas Health Reports or Dr. Red Duke's Health Reports, which aired on local television stations in the United States for fifteen years.

== Early life ==
Duke was born in Ennis, Texas. He graduated from Hillsboro High School and later earned a Bachelor of Science degree from Texas A&M University in 1950. He served as a yell leader at Texas A&M and was the first person to deliver the poem "The Last Corps Trip" publicly.

He served a two-year tour of duty as a tank officer in the 2nd Armored Division of the U.S. Army and then earned a divinity degree from Southwestern Baptist Theological Seminary in 1955. After reading a book by Albert Schweitzer, he changed vocations to medicine and enrolled in the University of Texas Southwestern Medical School in Dallas, from which he received his M.D. in 1960.

Duke completed his internship in internal medicine and his residency in general surgery at Dallas' Parkland Memorial Hospital in 1965. During his residency, Duke was the first surgeon to receive President John F. Kennedy at Parkland after he was shot in Dallas in 1963, then attended to the wounds of then Texas Governor John Connally.

He also pursued graduate studies at the Columbia University under a National Institutes of Health fellowship.

== Career ==
Duke was a fourth-year surgery resident at Parkland Hospital the day President John F. Kennedy and Texas Governor Connally were shot and rushed to that hospital. Upon their arrival, Duke says, "It didn't take long to appreciate the gravity of the situation." When asked what can you do for him, he said, "I can't do much for a dead man." He is credited with saving the life of Governor Connally.

Duke's academic career began in 1966 as an assistant professor of surgery at UT Southwestern Medical School and later at the Columbia University College of Physicians and Surgeons in New York. He also took some time to pursue graduate studies in chemical engineering, biochemistry and computer sciences at Columbia University under the auspices of an NIH Special Fellowship. While Duke was an assistant professor of surgery in New York, he spent two years from 1970 to 1972 in Jalalabad, Afghanistan, as a visiting professor and later chairman of surgery at Nangarhar University School of Medicine.

After returning from Afghanistan, Duke joined the faculty of McGovern Medical School (formerly the University of Texas Medical School at Houston), where he was a professor of surgery. Among his many responsibilities, Duke served as special assistant to the president of the UT Health Science Center and held one of the distinguished professorships at McGovern Medical School as the John B. Holmes Professor of Clinical Sciences. He established Houston's Hermann Hospital Life Flight operations in 1976 and helped establish its trauma and emergency services, of which he served as director.

Duke was a founding member of the American Trauma Society and was an Advanced Trauma Life Support instructor for the American College of Surgeons. He was named Surgeon of the Year by the James F. Mitchell Foundation in 1988. Duke's efforts to educate the public in health issues and tireless work as a crusader against trauma brought him into serious consideration for the position of Surgeon General of the United States in 1989.

On August 25, 2015, it was reported that Duke had died at Memorial Hermann Hospital in Houston from natural causes. He was 86 years old.

== Recognition ==
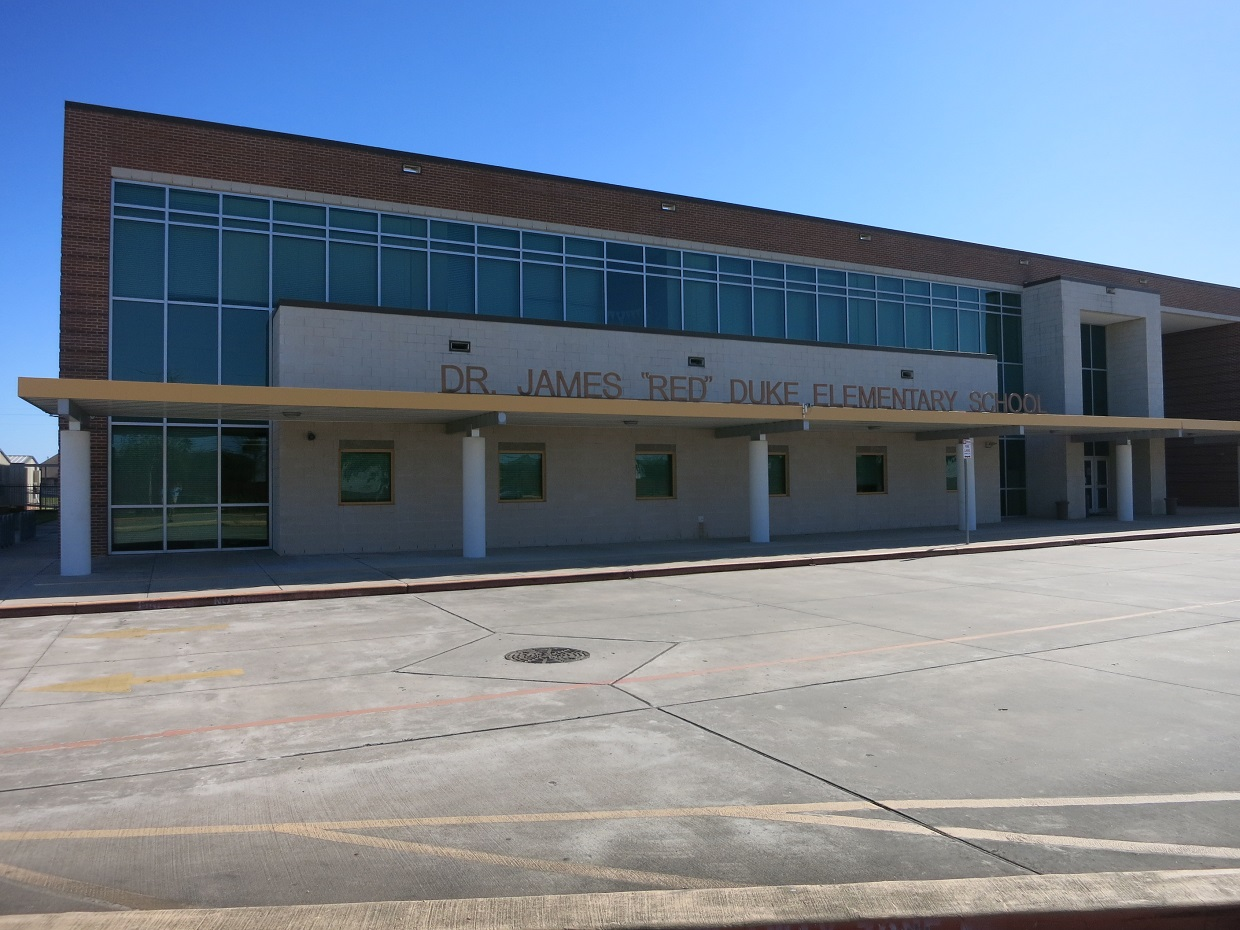
Dr. James "Red" Duke Elementary School

The University of Texas Medical School at Houston Department of Surgery sponsored a scholarship fund in honor of Duke, aimed towards students wishing to research and train in the field of trauma.

Duke was also noted outside the medical community. He attained the rank of Eagle Scout, and the Boy Scouts of America honored him with the Distinguished Eagle Scout Award. As founder and past president of the Texas Bighorn Society, Duke was a major supporter of many wildlife conservation organizations. He served as president of the Boone and Crockett Club, the oldest conservation organization in the United States, and the Foundation for North American Wild Sheep.

Duke was also one of the most recognized television personalities in his field, as determined by the Gallup Organization. He was the former host of the nationally syndicated Texas Health Reports and hosted the former PBS series Bodywatch. The programs educated millions about various health-related topics. He was well-recognized for his distinctive Texan accent, ever-present large mustache and "Duke-isms" (like his popular segment sign-off "For your health!"). Duke has been featured on such programs as PM Magazine, NBC Nightly News, The Today Show and the Buck James television series, which was based on him.

Dr. Red Duke Elementary School in the Alvin Independent School District opened in 2014 was named after Duke.

The Texas Cowboy Hall of Fame inducted Duke in 2010.

The Memorial Hermann Air Ambulance program, Life Flight, uses the FAA approved callsign “Red Duke” for all IFR flights in support of their air medical transports.
