= Travis County STAR Flight =

Texan emergency helicopter service

Travis County STAR Flight (Stylized STARFlight) is the emergency helicopter service of Travis County, Texas. As an agency of the Travis County government, STAR Flight conducts air ambulance, technical rescue, firefighting, and law enforcement support missions. Its area of operations includes 19 surrounding counties.

== History ==
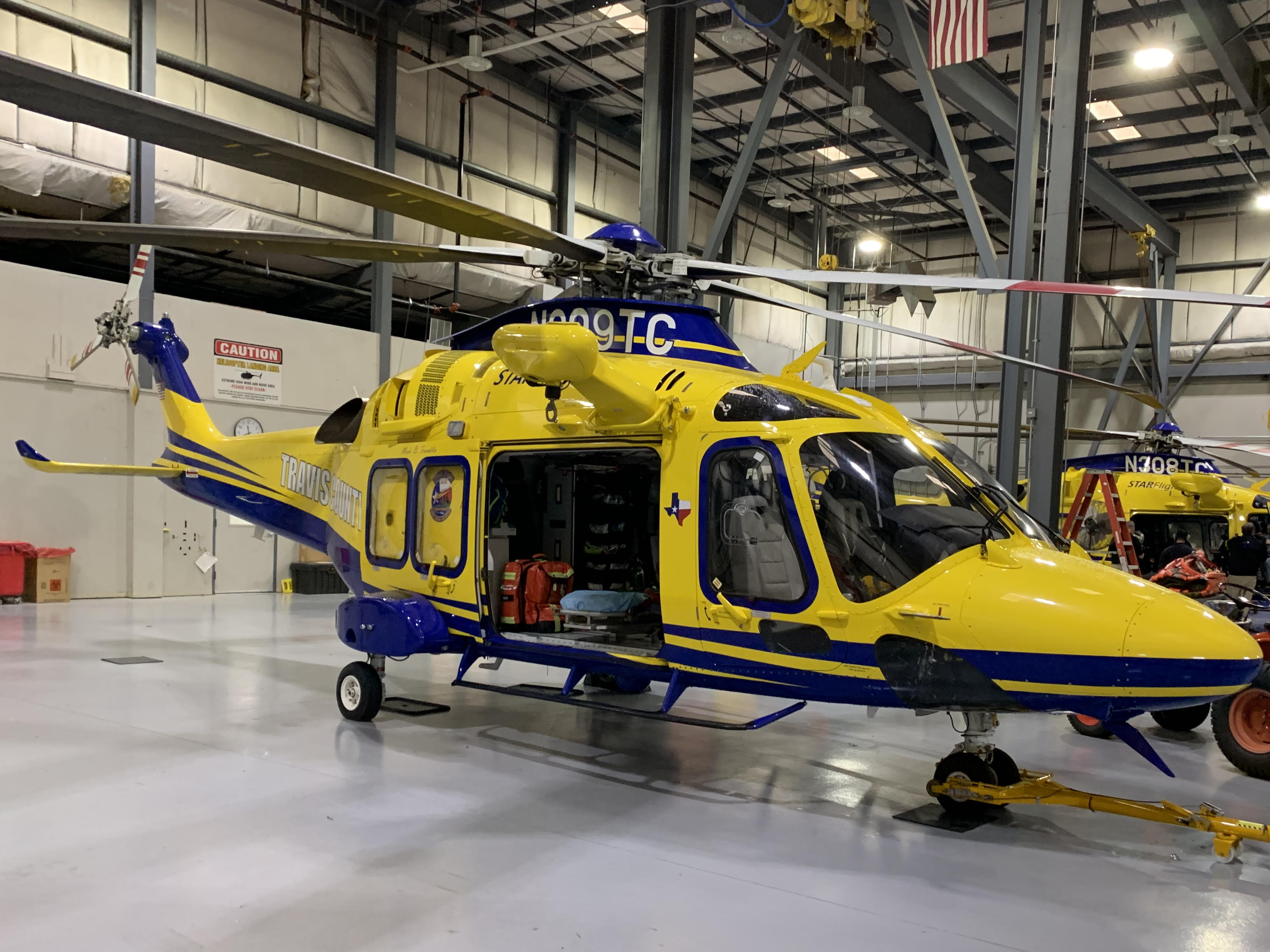
AW169 in Travis County STAR Flight livery.

=== 1985-2015 ===
Travis County STAR (Shock Trauma Air Rescue) Flight began in 1985 as a joint program involving Travis County, the City of Austin, and Brackenridge Hospital. The first aircraft used by STAR Flight was a Bell 206B, later replaced with a Bell 206L3. STAR Flight originated primarily to conduct air medical transport, which still makes up the majority of missions today. The program was eventually centralized, with all personnel and equipment under direction of Travis County.

The larger Bell 412SP was added to the STAR Flight fleet in 1990, bringing further capabilities such as search and rescue and firefighting.

In 1998, Travis County began an experimental program to use STAR Flight's smaller aircraft, the 206, for law enforcement support missions. The aircraft would be available to the Sheriff's Office or other law enforcement agencies, with priority still given to medical missions. As the flight crew are not law enforcement officers, they do not provide any support on the ground and are limited to aerial surveillance.

STAR Flight replaced its original aircraft with two Eurocopter EC135s in 1999. Besides the aircraft and avionics being newer, using two aircraft of the same model helped to simplify operations and maintenance.

In 2001, Travis County STAR Flight became the first public-safety program to receive accreditation from the Commission on Accreditation of Medical Transport Systems.

The EC135s were replaced in 2006 with two Eurocopter EC145s, with a third EC145 added to the fleet in 2010.

Beginning in 2012, STAR Flight based one aircraft at Dell Children's Medical Center. Until that time, STAR Flight's only hospital-based operations had been from Brackenridge Hospital.

In 2013, STAR Flight added a Bell UH-1H to its fleet as a dedicated firefighting aircraft. This was largely in response to the 2011 wildfire in Bastrop, during which STAR Flight conducted extensive fire suppression efforts utilizing EC145s and Bambi Buckets. The aircraft had seen service with the Army in Vietnam, and was refurbished for STAR Flight by Northwest Helicopters. The aircraft was re-outfitted for firefighting during refurbishment, including the installation of a 325-gallon fixed tank.

=== Death of Kristin McClain ===
On the evening of April 27, 2015, STAR Flight was conducting a hoist rescue of an injured hiker in the Barton Creek Greenbelt. Kristin Elizabeth McClain, the flight nurse and rescuer on the mission, was being lifted to the aircraft with the patient when she fell from the hoist. She died at the scene from injuries sustained in the fall.

The final report by the National Transportation Safety Board concluded that there had been no equipment failures, and that the McClain was not properly fastened to the hoist.

In the immediate aftermath of the incident, STAR Flight temporarily suspended operations. Following the NTSB investigation and report, the organization implemented additional safety checks by fellow crew members, as well as checks by first responders on the ground when feasible.

At Dell Children's Medical Center, a memorial plaque was unveiled at the helipad, which was named in McClain's honor. In 2019, four years after McClain's death, the STAR Flight hangar and base of operations in east Austin was named the Kristin E. McClain Building.

McClain's death was STAR Flight's first work fatality in its 30 years of operation.

=== 2015-Present ===
On May 21, 2017, Brackenridge Hospital was closed, with all hospital operations moved to the new Dell Seton Medical Center at the University of Texas. STAR Flight was included in this transfer, with one aircraft now based at the new hospital and one aircraft still based at Dell Children's Medical Center.

In October 2017, Travis County awarded a contract to AgustaWestland Philadelphia Corporation to replace the existing fleet with three AW169s.

Airbus Helicopters, which lost the bid for the new fleet, filed a protest with Travis County which rejected it. Airbus filed an appeal with the County Commissioners Court, which rejected the appeal at a hearing in February 2018.

The AW169s were delivered by June 2019 and entered operational service two months later.

As of January 2026, Travis County was seeking to replace each AW169 with a Bell 412EPX, citing high maintenance burden associated with the Leonardo aircraft. The new fleet replacement is expected to cost $60 million.

== Aircraft ==
=== Current ===
- 3 AgustaWestland AW169

=== Former ===
- Bell UH-1H (One aircraft acquired specifically for firefighting.)
- Eurocopter EC145
- Eurocopter EC135
- Bell 412SP
- Bell 206L3
- Bell 206B

== Flight Crew ==
Each aircraft is staffed with a pilot, a nurse, and a paramedic.

=== Pilot ===
Requirements:

- Three years as a helicopter pilot in command
- Helicopter Instrument Rating
- 3,000 hours of total flight time
- 1,500 hours helicopter pilot in command
- 500 hours of cross country
- 100 hours of unaided nighttime

Additional Training:

- Helicopter Rescue Hoist
- Helicopter Night Vision Goggle Operations

=== Nurse ===
Requirements:

- Texas Registered Nurse license
- Minimum 3 years experience in critical care
- BLS
- ACLS
- PALS
- Trauma certification
- Swim test
- Run/hike test
- Agility test
- Level I/II trauma experience
- CFRN

Additional Training:

- Helicopter Rescue Technician
- Hoist Operator

=== Paramedic ===
Requirements:

- Paramedic certification
- Minimum 5 years full-time EMS experience
- BLS
- ACLS
- PALS
- Trauma certification
- Swim test
- Run/hike test
- Agility test
- FP-C

Additional Training:

- Helicopter Rescue Technician
- Hoist Operator

== See also ==
- Memorial Hermann Life Flight
- CareFlite
- Government Flying Service
