= Air Ambulance Kent Surrey Sussex =

English charity air ambulance

Air Ambulance Charity Kent Surrey Sussex

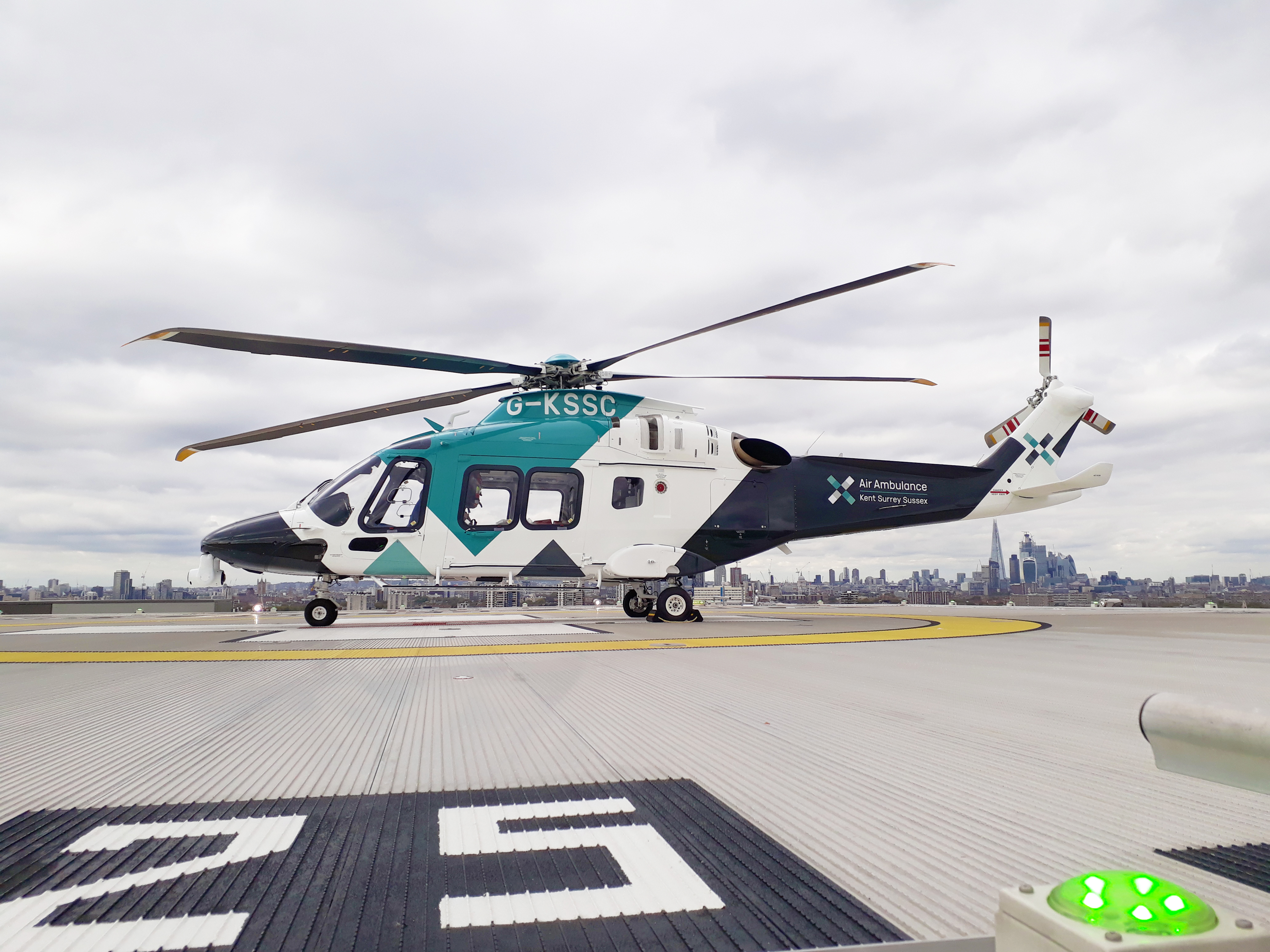
- G-KSSC AW169 at St George's Hospital
- Founded: 1989 (as South East Thames Air Ambulance); 2007 (as Air Ambulance Kent Surrey Sussex)
- Founder: Kate Chivers
- Type: Charitable organisation
- Purpose: Air ambulance
- Locations: Rochester Airport, Kent; Redhill Aerodrome, Surrey
- Region served: East Sussex; Kent; Surrey; West Sussex
- Aircraft operated: 3 x Leonardo AW169
- Revenue: £24.4 million (2025)
- Staff: 136 (2025)
- Volunteers: 126 (2025)
- Website: www.aakss.org.uk
- Formerly called: South East Thames Air Ambulance

Air Ambulance Charity Kent Surrey Sussex (KSS) is an organisation providing emergency medical services through the provision of a helicopter air ambulance covering the four English counties of Kent, Surrey, East Sussex and West Sussex, which are served by the South East Coast Ambulance Service, which is a registered charity, raising money from public and private donations in excess of £15 million every year. The charity's aircraft are based and maintained at Redhill Aerodrome in Surrey. Its headquarters and forward operating base are at Rochester Airport in Kent.

== Operations ==
The charity provides air ambulance cover for the all four counties, in association with the South East Coast Ambulance Service.

KSS currently operates three helicopters, three AgustaWestland AW169 G-KSST since 2017 and G-KSSC since 2018 and G-LNAC since 2023, which is used as a backup. This replaced G-KSSA a MD902 aircraft which retired from AAKSS. The helicopters can reach any area of the four counties within a 25-minute flight. Two previous MD 902 Explorers (G-KAAT, G-KSSH) served the trust throughout the 2000s. The MD 902 helicopters were able to fly at nearly 150 mph (130 kn; 240 km/h),

In addition to the helicopters, there are four rapid response vehicles (RRV), one Volvo XC70 and three Volvo XC90, which are used when circumstances mean that the helicopters cannot operate. The charity previously had a rapid response car that was donated in May 2009 by Sussex Police, having formerly been one of their traffic patrol vehicles.

As of 2021, KSS have attended 30,000 incidents since their inception in 1989.

KSS mostly relies on voluntary donations to meet its running costs. In the year ending March 2025, the charity raised income of £24.4 million, including £2M from government contracts. It spent £20.8M, of which £15.2M (73%) was used to operate the charitable service. The charity employed 136 people, 17 of whom were paid more than £60,000.

Most of the doctors and paramedics are employed by the NHS and military. In 2020, the service paid £800,000 (from a total cost of £1M) for onboard doctors and £880,000 (from a total cost of £1.46M) for paramedics and NHS clinical managers.

== History ==
KSS, an expansion of the existing Kent Air Ambulance service, went into operation in 2007, covering the two counties of Sussex and Surrey.

On 30 October 2015, it was announced that the charity would invest £10M in relocating its flying base near Paddock Wood.

In 2017, one of the three MD 902 Explorer helicopters (G-KAAT) was retired after over 17 years of service for the trust and replaced by a new AgustaWestland AW169 helicopter capable of night time flights, giving KSS a 24-hour capability.

In 2018, a second AW169 (G-KSSC) entered service. This caused the service establish a forward operating base at Rochester Airport, to accommodate the larger helicopter, alongside the existing base at Redhill Aerodrome. The arrival of the new AW169 promoted the rebranding and name change of the charity.

In late 2019, an MD 902 (G-KSSH) was retired and sold after 12 years of service with the charity. The remaining MD 902 (G-KSSA) is used as a backup helicopter for when the AW169 machines are out of service for maintenance.

In April 2022, a 3rd AW169, G-LNAC, arrived to replace G-KSSA.

=== Kent Air Ambulance ===
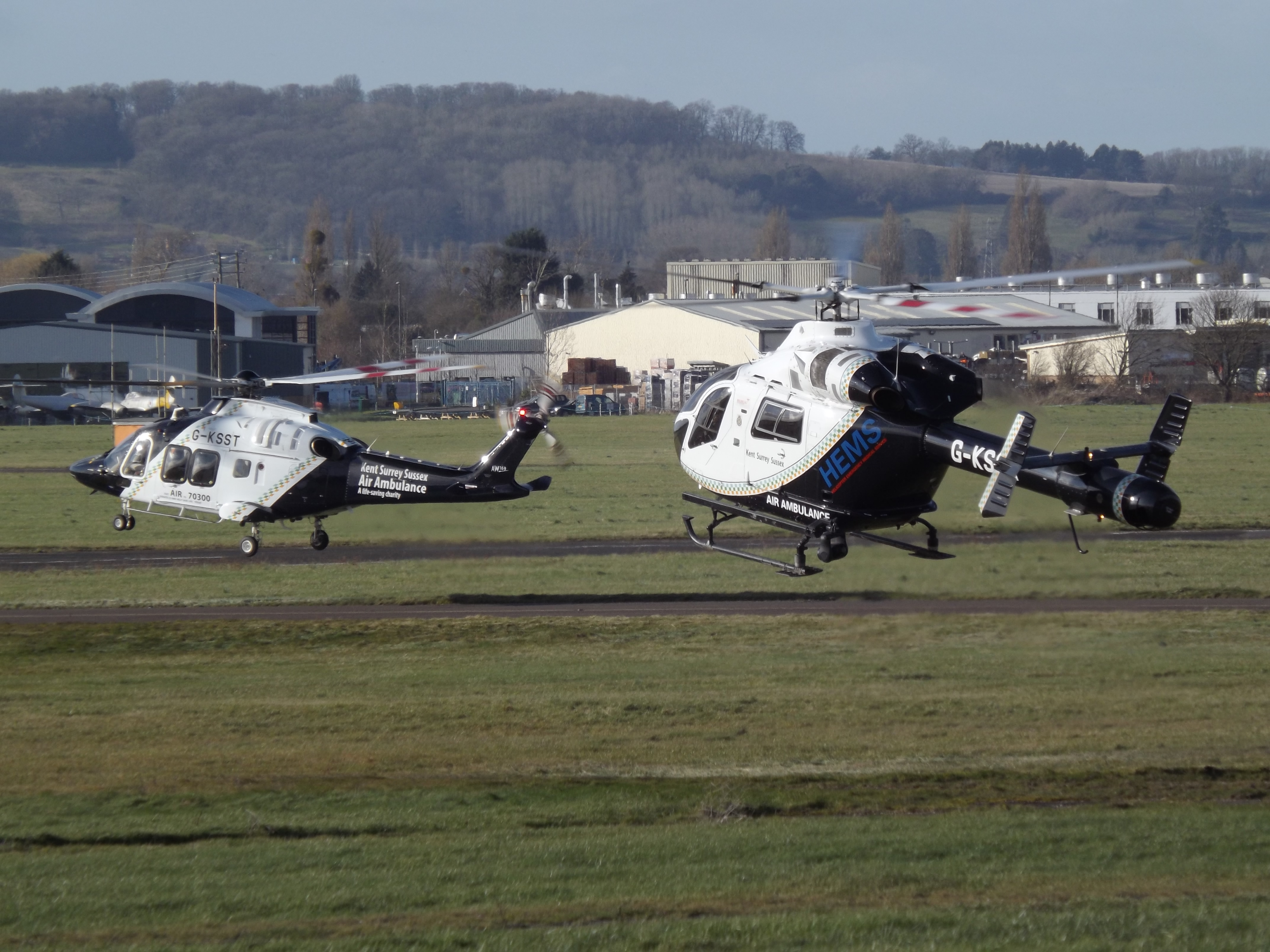
G-KSSA and G-KSST

The Kent Air Ambulance Trust became a registered charity established in 1989, serving only Kent. The trust was founded by Kate Chivers, and was originally called the South East Thames Air Ambulance. It initially operated on a part-time basis, but became a seven-day service in January 2000. Shortly afterwards it moved from Rochester Airport to a new base at Marden near Maidstone.

It operated one McDonnell Douglas MD 902 Explorer helicopter, registration G-KAAT, from its headquarters in Marden.

=== Sussex joint Police Air Operations Unit & Air Ambulance ===
The MD 902, G-SUSX, was crewed by a pilot, an air observer from Sussex Police, who was a sworn police officer and a paramedic seconded from South East Coast Ambulance Service, who was also trained as an air observer.

Under the now KSSAAT, the Sussex-based helicopter also served Surrey – creating Air Ambulance Kent Surrey Sussex.

== See also ==
- Air ambulance services in the United Kingdom
- South East Coast Ambulance Service
