= CareFlite =

Nonprofit ambulance service in Texas, US

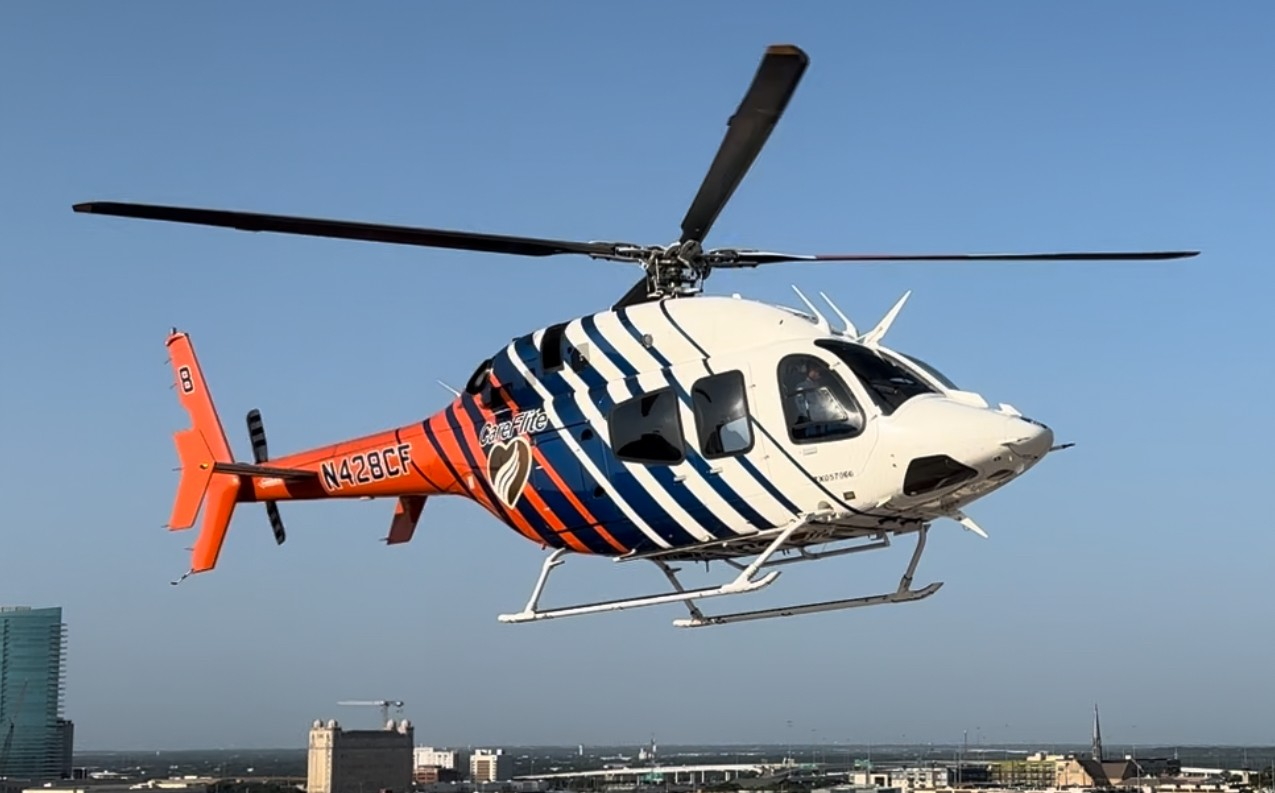
CareFlite Bell 429 over Fort Worth, Texas.

CareFlite is a nonprofit ambulance service based in Grand Prairie, Texas, which operates throughout North and Central Texas. CareFlite's original namesake service is helicopter air ambulance, though today it also performs fixed-wing and ground transport.

CareFlite's Board of Directors includes representatives from Texas Health Resources, Methodist Health System, Baylor Scott & White Health Care System, Parkland Health and Hospital System, and the JPS Health Network.

== History ==
CareFlite began operations in 1979. It originated with one helicopter, a Bell 206L, which was shared between Methodist Dallas Medical Center and Harris Methodist Fort Worth Hospital. It is the oldest joint-use air medical program in the United States. CareFlite augmented their air ambulance service with ground operations in 1981.

== Fleet ==
=== Current aircraft ===
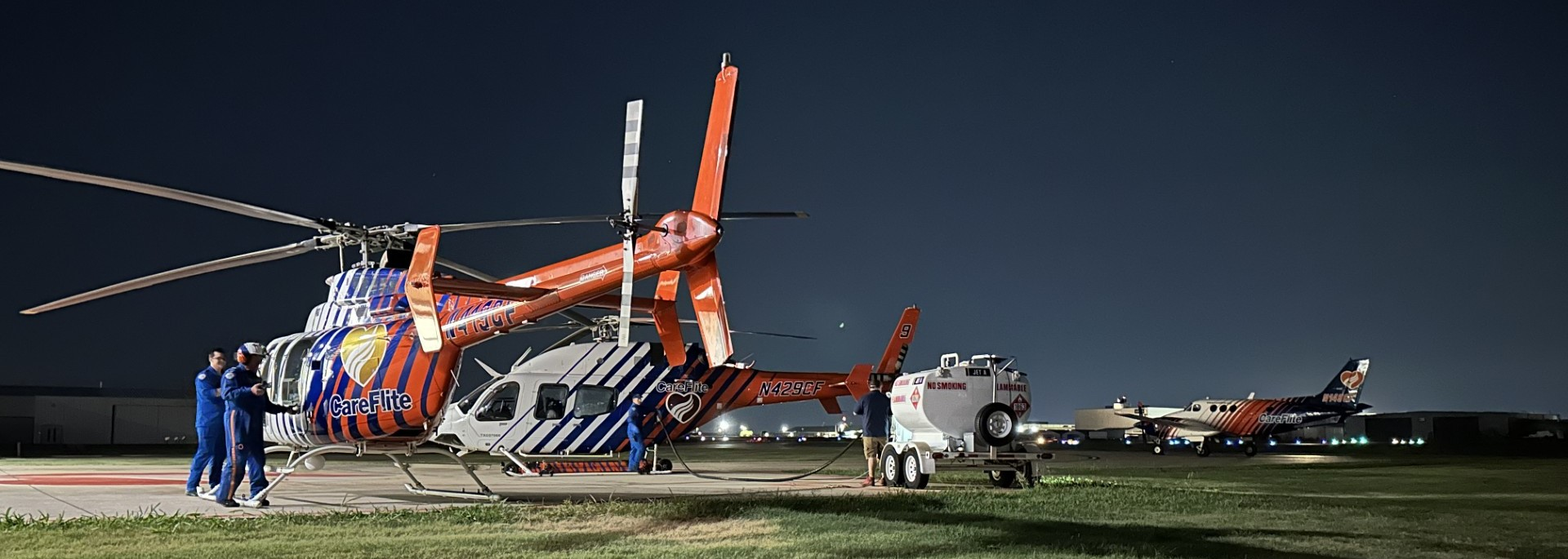
CareFlite helicopters with fixed-wing aircraft in background.

CareFlite currently operates eight helicopters, one fixed-wing aircraft, and several ground ambulances.

- 2 Airbus H145D3 (planned)
- 2 Bell 429
- 5 Bell 407GX
- 1 Bell 407GXi
- 1 Beech C90

=== Former aircraft ===
- Agusta AW109
- Bell 222UT
- Bell 206L

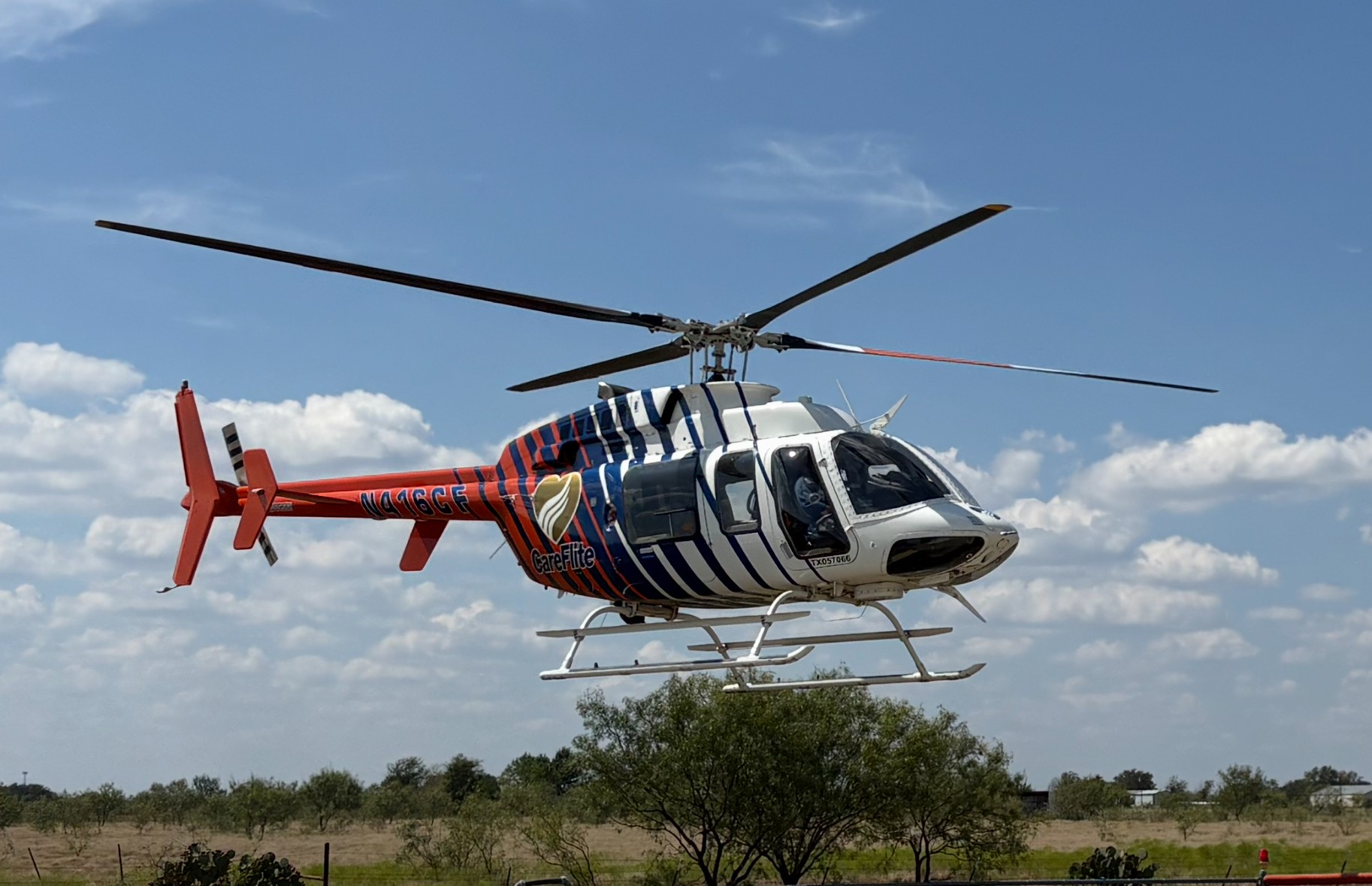
CareFlite Bell 407GX in Hill County, Texas

== Operations ==
=== Air Operations ===
Each aircraft is staffed by a pilot, a flight nurse, and a flight paramedic. CareFlite aircraft provide emergency support for 9-1-1 services, as well as interfacility transfers. Specialty transports performed in cooperation with sponsor facilities include ECMO, IABP, Impella, and field amputation teams.

=== Ground Operations ===
In addition to ground interfacility transfer and wheelchair van services, CareFlite provides 9-1-1 EMS ground service in the following areas:

- Hill County
- Johnson County
- Kaufman County

== Bases of Operation ==
=== Air Bases ===
==== Helicopter ====
- Methodist Dallas Medical Center
- Texas Health Harris Methodist Fort Worth Hospital
- Terrell Municipal Airport
- North Texas Medical Center
- Granbury Regional Airport
- Whitney, Texas
- Burnet, Texas

==== Fixed-wing ====
- Grand Prairie Municipal Airport

=== Ground Bases ===
- Plano
- Allen
- Lewisville
- Azle
- Mansfield
- Arlington
- Fort Worth
- Bedford
- Grapevine
- Dallas
- Richardson
- Duncanville
- Willow Park
- Stephenville
- Seagoville
- Mabank
- Kemp
- Kaufman
- Forney
- Terrell
- Midlothian
- Cleburne
- Burleson FD Station 3
- ESD Station 83
- Joshua
- Alvarado
- Grandview
- Venus
- Burleson FD Station 16
- Hubbard
- Itasca
- Hillsboro
- Whitney
- Covington

== Accidents ==
- On September 3, 2003, a CareFlite AW109 lost power while taking off from the Methodist Dallas Medical Center. The pilot aborted the takeoff, forcing the aircraft onto its side on the helipad to avoid going over the side of the building. The pilot was injured in the crash.
- On June 2, 2010, a CareFlite 222 was undergoing a post-maintenance flight near Midlothian, Texas, when it broke up in the air. The pilot and the mechanic on board were both killed in the crash. The probable cause was found to be fracture of a swashplate drive pin.
- On September 30, 2012, a CareFlite AW109 dispatched on mission entered IFR conditions, shortly thereafter descending from the clouds. The aircraft impacted the ground at a level attitude, skidded and landed on its side. The three crew members were seriously injured.

== Memberships ==
As with some other air ambulance services, CareFlite offers yearly memberships to cover transport costs not paid by medical insurance. The membership costs are charged per household. This includes helicopter, ground, and most fixed-wing transport costs.

=== Fixed-wing transport ===
If insurance deems a fixed-wing transport usage not medically necessary or denies claim, the member is responsible 50% of the charges.

== See also ==
- Memorial Hermann Life Flight
- Travis County STAR Flight
