= AgustaWestland AW169 =

Twin-engine light utility helicopter

AW169
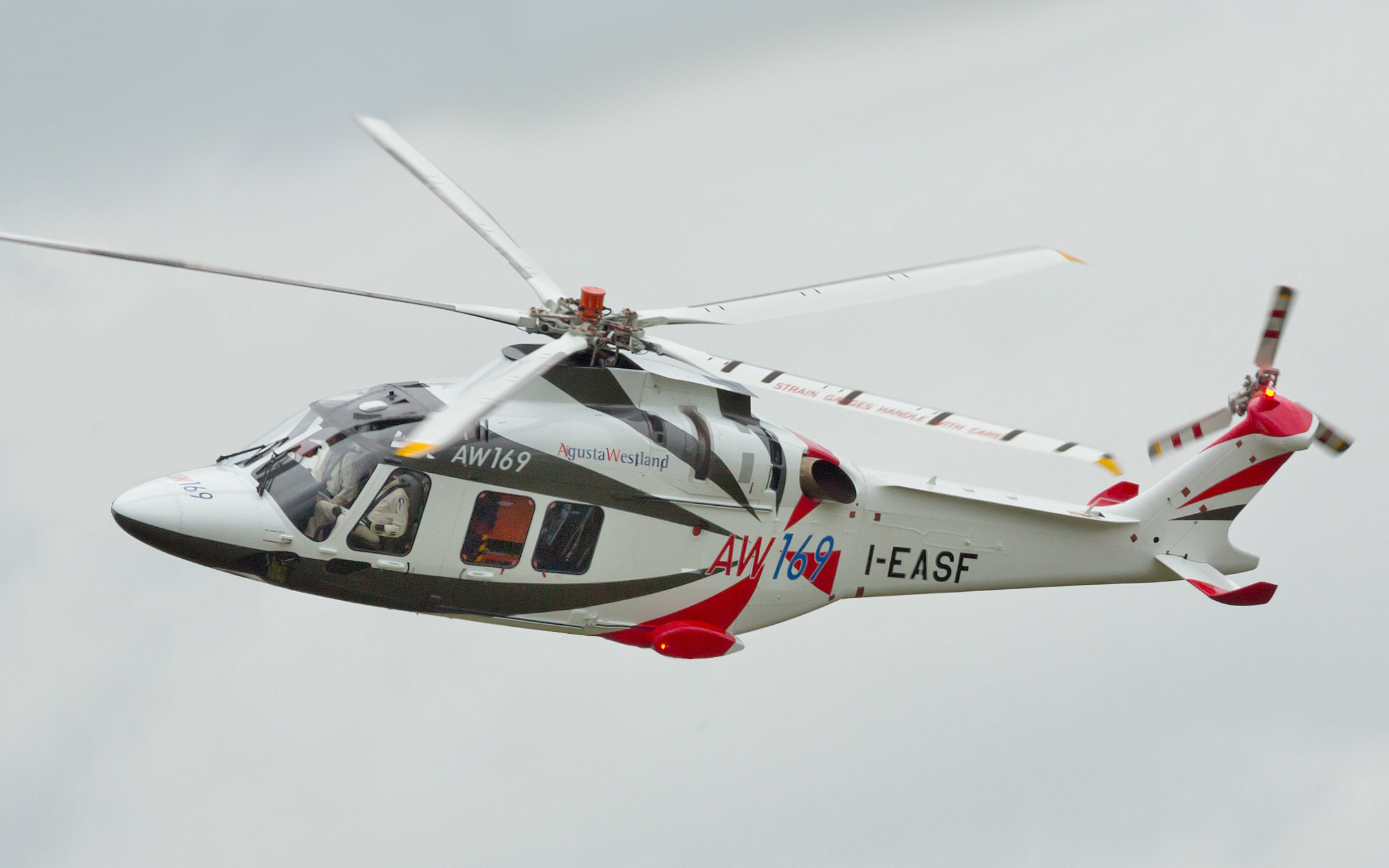
- AW169 at the Farnborough Air Show, 2012

General information
- Type: Helicopter
- National origin: Italy
- Manufacturer: Leonardo S.p.A. AgustaWestland
- Status: Active service
- Number built: 170+ as of October 2023

History
- Manufactured: 2015–present
- Introduction date: 2015
- First flight: 10 May 2012

The AgustaWestland AW169 is a twin-engine, 10-seat, 4.8t helicopter developed and manufactured by the helicopter division of Leonardo (formerly AgustaWestland, merged into Finmeccanica since 2016). It was designed to share similarities with the larger AgustaWestland AW139 and AgustaWestland AW189.

== Development ==
On 19 July 2010, AgustaWestland formally announced that the AW169 was under development at the Farnborough International Air Show. According to AgustaWestland, the 4.5 ton AW169 is a light-intermediate twin engine rotorcraft intended for a range of utility operations; to lower prospective operational costs, a decision was made early on for the AW169 to share a large level of commonality across both components and the cockpit configuration with the larger AgustaWestland AW139. In 2011, the British Government provided a $33 million loan to AgustaWestland for the AW169 development program. In 2012, the European Union approved a 19-year €272 million zero‑interest loan from the Italian government to AgustaWestland to finance the development of the AW169; industrial research is 40% of the total, and experimental development is 60%, while the aid element is €94 million.

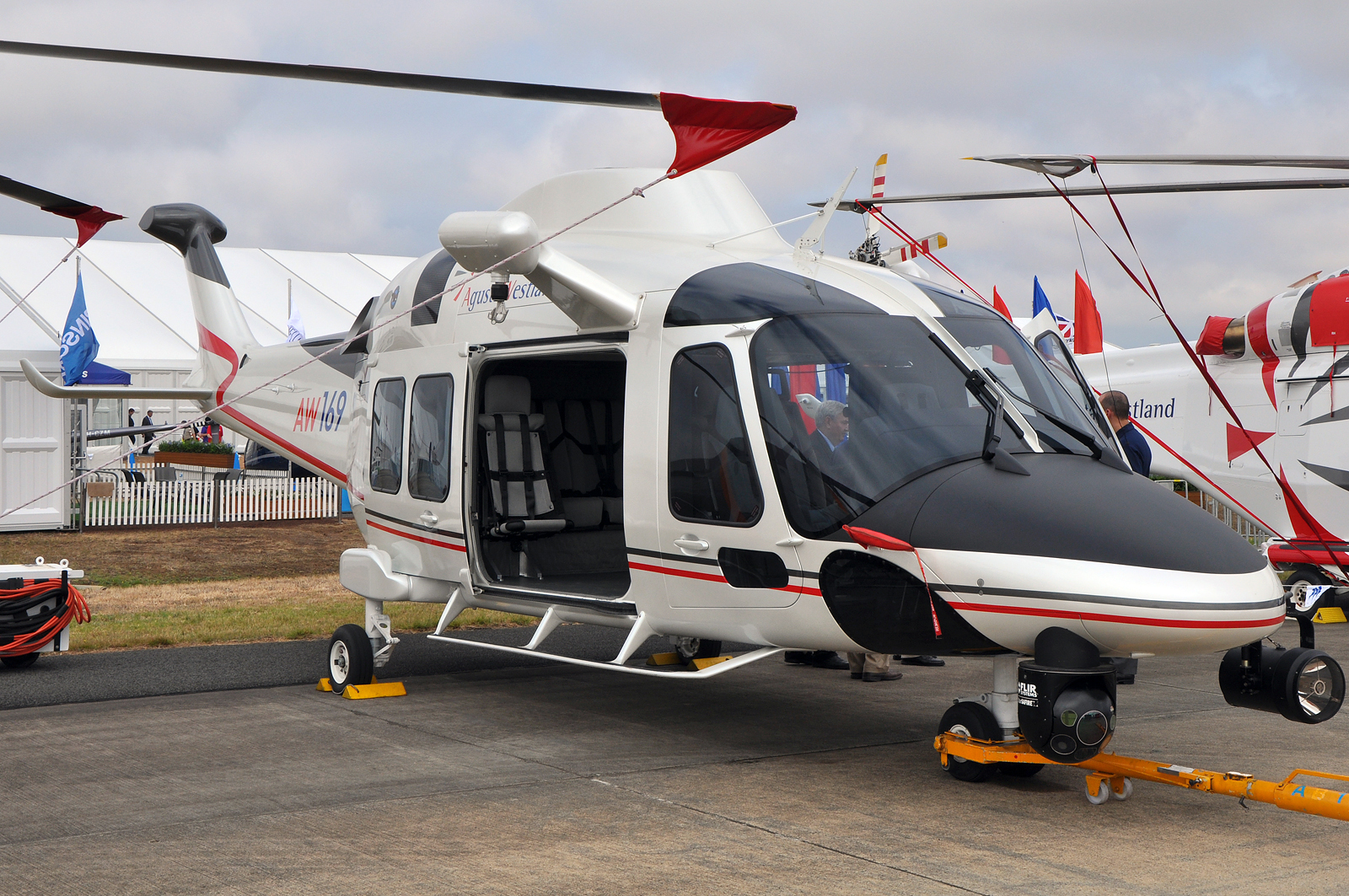
AW169 demonstrator, 2013

On 10 May 2012, the first prototype of the type conducted its first flight. The testing program involved a total of four prototypes; the second and third AW169s joined the flight test program later on in 2012, and the fourth in 2013. AgustaWestland had initially anticipated that the AW169 would receive flight certification in 2014, and had planned for production AW169 aircraft to enter service by 2015. On 15 July 2015, the European Aviation Safety Agency (EASA) issued its certification for the AW169.

In November 2015, a prototype was dispatched to various locations in California, United States, for high and low altitude flight tests in support of Federal Aviation Administration (FAA) certification. In February 2016, the AW169 received FAA certification, enabling deliveries of the type to occur later that year.

In 2012, AgustaWestland stated that it was planning to produce the AW169 in its facilities in Yeovil, England. The design and manufacture of various components such as the rotor blades, intermediate and tail gearboxes, and tail rotor hub was performed by AgustaWestland's UK branch. In January 2015, the assembly of the first production AW169s began at AgustaWestland's factory in Vergiate, Italy; initial production models were produced at this site. In 2015, manufacturing activity on the AW169 also commenced on a second production line at AgustaWestland's facility in Philadelphia, USA; the rate of production was reportedly planned to be increased to 20 US-built rotorcraft per year by 2017. However, in October 2016, it was announced that Leonardo, the rebranded identity of AgustaWestland, had decided to abandon work on its planned US production of the type.

=== Indian manufacturing line ===
Adani Defence & Aerospace signed another memorandum of understanding with Leonardo for the strategic partnership to establish India's helicopter manufacturing ecosystem. The companies will setup an assembly line for AW169M and AW109 TrekkerM helicopters with phased indigenisation as well as MRO facilities. This is meant to fulfil the requirement of over 1,000 helicopters by the Indian Armed Forces.

The AW169M will be fielded for the Indian Navy and Coast Guard's Naval Utility Helicopter (NUH) tender for 76 helicopters against HAL Utility Helicopter-Marine. A joint reply for the tender has been sent to the Indian Defense Ministry. The ecosystem will also serve the domestic civilian market demand.

== Design ==
The AW169 is a medium-sized twin engine helicopter; upon launch, it held the distinction of being the first all new aircraft in its weight category in over 30 years. Weighing roughly 4,500 kg and accommodating 7–10 passengers, it is positioned between the 3,175 kg 8-seat AW109GrandNew and the much larger 6,400 kg 15-seat AW139. The AW169 is powered by a pair of Pratt & Whitney Canada PW210A FADEC turboshaft engines, which drives the main rotor at variable speeds to reduce external noise and increase efficiency. Newly developed dampers were installed between the rotor blades of the main rotor in order to reduce vibration levels for a smooth passenger experience. It has the distinction of being the first production helicopter of its category to feature electrically actuated landing gear. AgustaWestland has reported having various customers for the AW169, including air ambulance, law enforcement, executive/corporate, offshore transport and utility sectors.

The AW169 is equipped with various avionics systems, including a Rockwell Collins glass cockpit featuring three displays outfitted with touchscreen interfaces, digital maps, dual radar altimeters, automatic dependent surveillance – broadcast tracking, Health and usage monitoring systems (HUMS), and night vision goggles (NVG) compatibility. Many elements of the cockpit and avionics are similar to those installed on the AgustaWestland AW139 and the AgustaWestland AW189, providing a high level of support. The use of a four-axis digital automatic flight control system and a dual flight management system incorporating terrain and traffic avoidance systems has allowed for the rotorcraft to be certified to be flown by a single pilot under instrument flight rules (IFR).

There is no auxiliary power unit installed on the AW169; instead, the transmission features a clutch to allow the rotors to be stopped while the port engine continues to run to power the avionics and onboard electrical systems. On customer request, the AW169 can be equipped with a comprehensive full ice protection system; alternatively, a limited ice protection system may also be integrated. To meet differing customer's requirements and preferences, the AW169 can be configured with numerous optional items of equipment, such as auxiliary fuel tanks, rescue hoist, cargo hook, emergency flotation aids, external cameras, rappelling fittings, wire strike protection system, mission consoles, external loudspeakers, and external lighting arrangements.

In a utility passenger configuration, up to 10 people can be accommodated in the AW169's main cabin, while a corporate transport arrangement can house a maximum of eight people, and a more spacious VIP layout holds six to seven passengers instead. The VIP interior, developed and offered by Mecaer Aviation Group (MAG), features include the Silens noise and vibration-reduction system, the IFEEL In-flight entertainment system, and numerous luxurious cabin refinements. In the emergency medical services (EMS) role, the cabin can accommodate a pair of stretchers while maintaining easy access across each patient from either side, a full medical suite can also be installed.

== Operational history ==
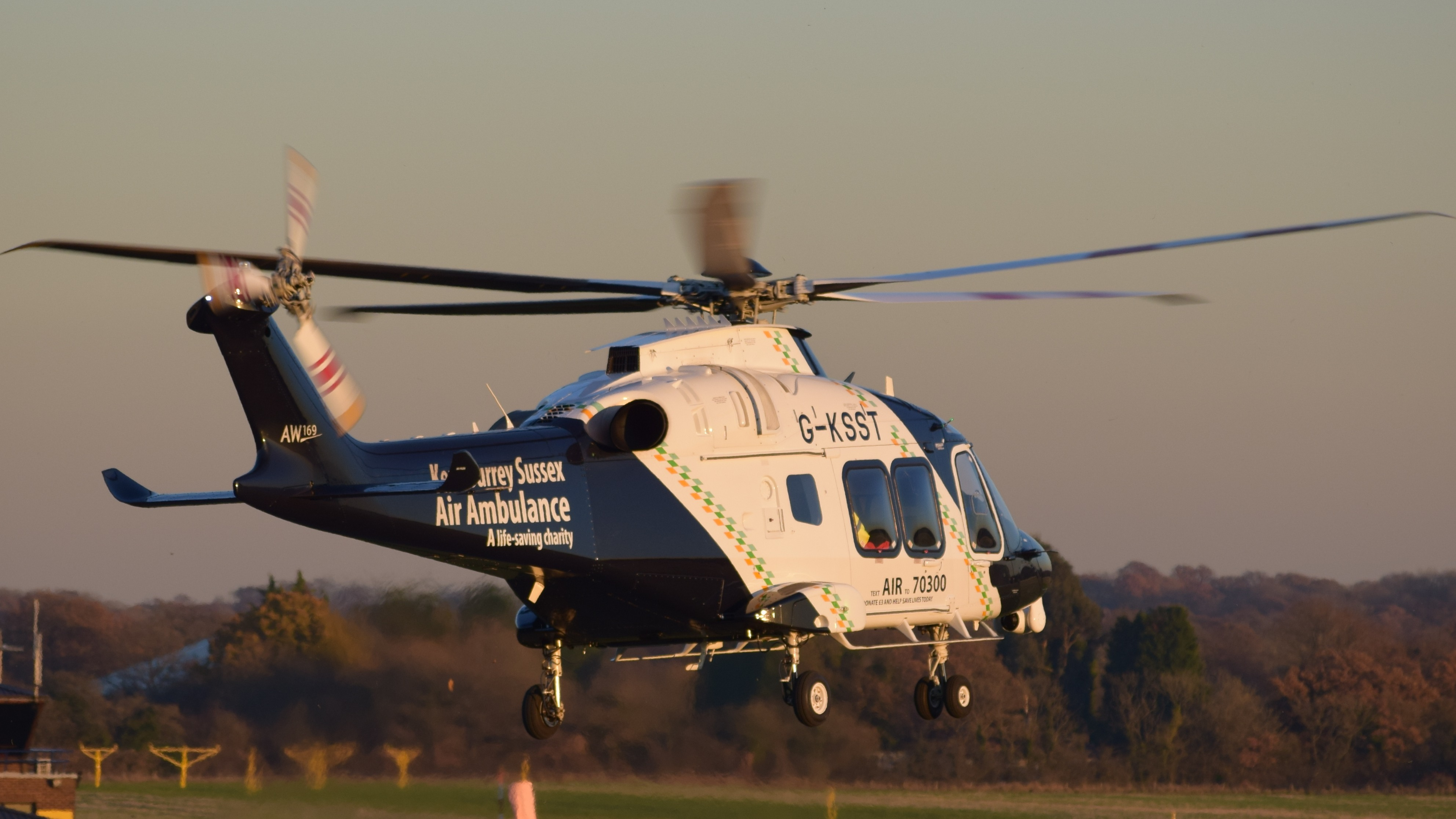
AW169 G-KSST operated by the Kent, Surrey and Sussex Air Ambulance

In April 2013, AgustaWestland unveiled the AW169 AAS as its contender in the United States Army's Armed Aerial Scout program. It stood out as the largest contender, boasting a gross weight of 10,000 lbs, nearly double the weight of the Bell OH-58 Kiowa it aimed to replace. This substantial size was highlighted by AgustaWestland for its ability to offer unparalleled cabin flexibility, accommodating features like extended range tanks, command and control facilities, and potential manned-unmanned teaming workstations. While the size presented challenges in terms of air transportability by strategic airlifters, AgustaWestland assured that they had solutions to meet the Army's requirements for disassembly and reassembly within specified time limits. Despite the program's promising size and performance attributes, the AAS program was ultimately terminated in late 2013 without progressing to procurement. In later 2013, the AAS program was terminated without any procurement being made.

In September 2015, it was reported that the first AW169 had been delivered to an unidentified VIP customer. The launch customer for the AW169 is Lease Corporation International (LCI); by October 2015, LCI had a total of 12 AW169s on order, the first of which being configured to perform offshore operations. In October 2014, it was announced that the Kent, Surrey and Sussex Air Ambulance would become the first Helicopter Emergency Medical Services (HEMS) operator to use the AW169 in the United Kingdom. In December 2015, AgustaWestland and air-rescue operator REGA announced the formation of a partnership agreement to develop a dedicated search and rescue (SAR) variant of the AW169, REGA also ordered an initial three such rotorcraft at the same time.

By February 2016, at least 20 AW169's had been delivered to various customers across the world and have been used in roles such as EMS, VIP transport, utility and offshore duties.

In July 2017, the National Police Directorate of Norway announced they had reached an agreement with Leonardo to purchase three AW169 for a value of 313 million NOK. The contract includes 10 years support and maintenance for a total contract of 670 million NOK, as well as an option for a further three AW169s. The helicopters are expected to enter service by 2019 and will replace the two Eurocopter EC135 currently in use. The main competitor was the Eurocopter EC145.

In September 2020, the Austrian Defense Ministry announced the acquisition of 18 AW169s; these will replace Austria's long-serving fleet of Alouette III helicopters.

In July, 2023, the Canadian company Ascent Helicopters Ltd. won a 10-year, $544-million CAD contract to take over as the Province of British Columbia’s sole air-ambulance helicopter provider, replacing several other providers, and will import seven new AW169s for the job, expected to start between late fall 2024 and early spring 2025.

In March 2024, North Macedonia finalised a contract with Leonardo to procure eight helicopters—four AW149s and four AW169Ms—as part of a €249.9 million agreement aimed at modernising its aging Soviet-era fleet.

In March 2025, Gama Aviation ordered three AW169 helicopters in a new skidded configuration for emergency medical services in the UK, marking the type’s introduction to the European EMS market. That same month, Leonardo announced new orders for the AW139 in China, including three units for CITIC Offshore Helicopter Company and three for China General Aviation Company, with an option for a fourth, for use in offshore transport operations.

== Variants ==
AW169
Overall designation for type.
AW169 AAS
Designation for militarised variant proposed for the Armed Aerial Scout program (cancelled)
AW169M (Multiruolo, Multirole)
Designation for multirole variant UH-169A, ordered by Italian Guardia di Finanza
UH-169D Light Utility Helicopter
Designation of the militarised variant for the Italian Army, with adaptations for troop transport, utility support, armed reconnaissance and close air support operations.

== Operators ==
=== Military ===
Austria

- Austrian Air Force 36 on order made of:
  - 6 AW169B Lion, a training variant (5 delivered as of end 2023)
  - 12 AW169MA Lion, a light multirole / attack variant
  - 18 AW169M Lion, a light multirole helicopter

Dominican Republic

- Dominican Air Force (4 on order)

Italy

- Guardia di Finanza (22 on order, 1 crashed)
- Italian Army (2 UH-169B delivered and 30 UH-169D on order (of which 15 have been delivered as of November 2026)
- Westair Helicopters

North Macedonia

- Army of North Macedonia (4 AW169M on order) ref

Qatar

- Qatar Emiri Air Force (1 delivered, +3 on order)

=== Government and civil ===
Argentina

- National Gendarmerie (1 delivered)

Canada

- British Columbia Ambulance Service, operated by Ascent Helicopters Ltd. (7 in service)

Germany

- Heli Service International

Indonesia

- Indonesian National Police (9 in service)

Japan

Power line patrol

- Tohoku Electric Power Network

News gathering

- The Asahi Shimbun Company
- Asahi Broadcasting Corporation
- Nagoya Broadcasting Network Co., Ltd.
- Nippon Television Network Corporation / THE YOMIURI-SHIMBUN (Fractional Ownership)

Rescue and Firefighting

- Yamaguchi Prefecture Fire Fighting Disaster Prevention Air Corps
- Chiba City Fire Department Air Corps

Transportation

- Aero Asahi (1 + 2 on order)

Norway

- Coastal Administration
- Norwegian Police Service

New Zealand

- Auckland Rescue Helicopter Trust

Slovenia

- Slovenian National Police Force (3 delivered)

Sweden

- Babcock Scandinavian AirAmbulance

Taiwan (Republic of China)

- Emerald Pacific Airlines
- Heli Service Taiwan

United Kingdom

- Cornwall Air Ambulance
- UNI-FLY Operates the AW169 for offshore Wind Farm Support including heli-hoisting and maintenance teams flights.
- Heli Service International operates the AW169 for Lincolnshire and Nottinghamshire Air Ambulance.
- Specialist Aviation Services operates the AW169 in HEMS role for the following air ambulances:
  - Air Ambulance Kent Surrey Sussex
  - Dorset and Somerset Air Ambulance
  - Essex & Herts Air Ambulance
  - Magpas

United States

- Life Link III
- Palm Beach County Trauma Hawk
- Parkview Health Samaritan
- Travis County STAR Flight
- Premier Health CareFlight

== Accidents and incidents ==
On 27 October 2018, AW169 registration G-VSKP owned by Thai billionaire Vichai Srivaddhanaprabha, chairman of English football club, Leicester City, crashed shortly after take-off from the King Power Stadium, Leicester, United Kingdom and was destroyed by the resulting fire. All five people aboard the aircraft died, including Vichai. An initial Special Bulletin issued by the Air Accident Investigation Board (AAIB) has attributed the accident to tail rotor failure after analysing the flight recorder and noting the aircraft failed to respond to the pilot's foot pedal commands. In December 2018 the AAIB reported their finding that a rotating bearing at the outer end of the tail rotor control shaft had become seized, causing the shaft to unscrew itself.

As a result of their findings, the AAIB made several Safety Recommendations to EASA relating to CS.29 (Certification Specification Large Rotorcraft).

On 27 March 2021, Italy's Guardia di Finanza lost a UH-169A (AW169M) helicopter in a crash at its home base, Bolzano Airport. Whilst taxiing to the parking spot, the crew of MM81970/504 (construction number 69109) lost control and fell on its side on the tarmac, apparently due to human error, causing considerable damage to the helicopter. All crew members were unhurt.

== Specifications (AW169) ==
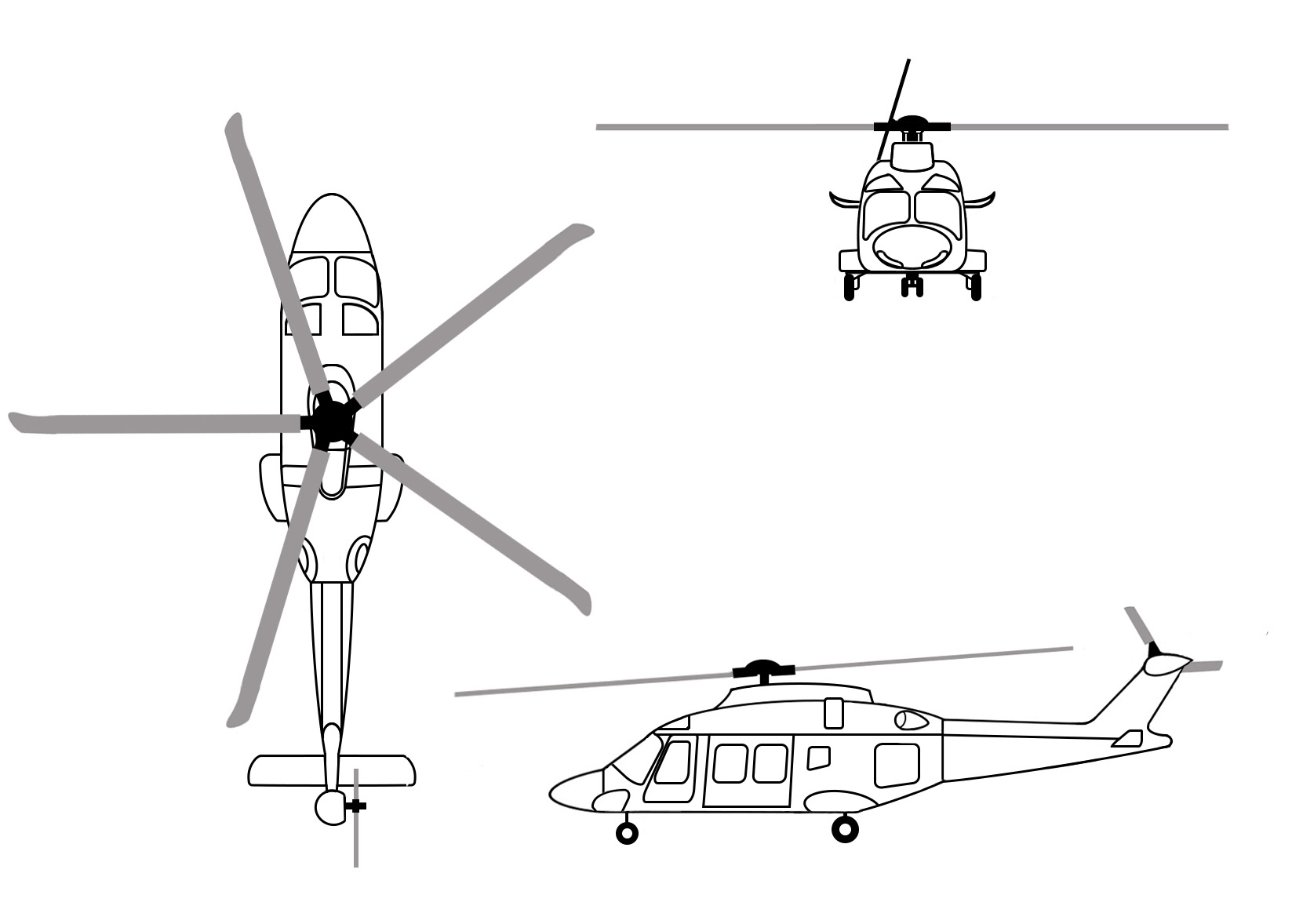
Drawing lines

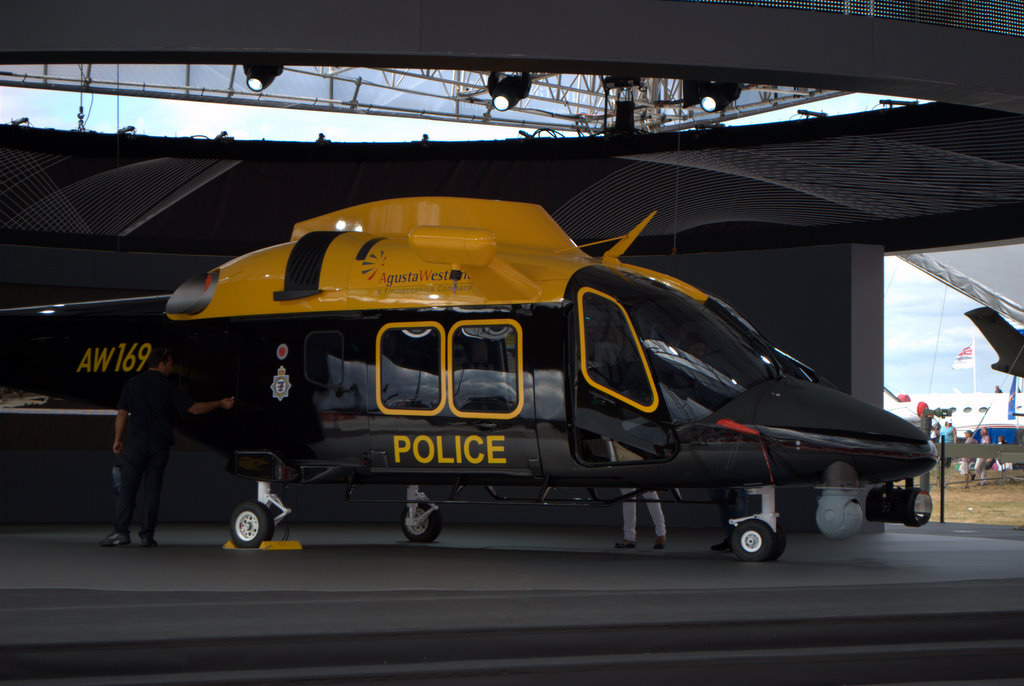
AgustaWestland AW169 mockup at model launch

Data from Leonardo Type Certificate Data Sheet and AW169 company brochures

General characteristics

- Crew: 1 or 2 (Note: For NVG operations, a pilot and second crew member is required, both to wear Night Vision Goggles.)
- Capacity: 8 to 12 passengers, plus 250 kg (551 lbs) baggage and cargo; or 1 stretcher, plus 7 medical attendants; or 2 stretchers, plus 5 medical attendants
- Length: 14.645 m (48 ft 1 in)
- Width: 2.530 m (8 ft 4 in) Horizontal stab 3.205 m
- Height: 4.50 m (15 ft 0 in)
- Empty weight: 2,850 kg (6,283 lb)
- Max takeoff weight: 4,800 kg (10,582 lb)
- Powerplant: 2 × Pratt & Whitney PW210A turboshaft with FADEC (735 kW, 1,000 shp class each)
- Main rotor diameter: 12.12 m (39 ft 9 in)

Performance

- Maximum speed: 306 km/h (190 mph, 165 kn)
- Never exceed speed: 306 km/h (190 mph, 165 kn) Power on with both engines operative
- Range: 820 km (510 mi, 440 nmi)
- Endurance: 4h 20m

== See also ==
Related development

- AgustaWestland AW139
- AgustaWestland AW189

Aircraft of comparable role, configuration, and era

- Bell 429 GlobalRanger
- Eurocopter EC155
- HAL Dhruv
- HAL Rudra
- KAI LCH
- KAI LAH
- Sikorsky S-76

Related lists

- List of rotorcraft
