= Children's Memorial Hermann Hospital =

- Memorial Hermann Health System

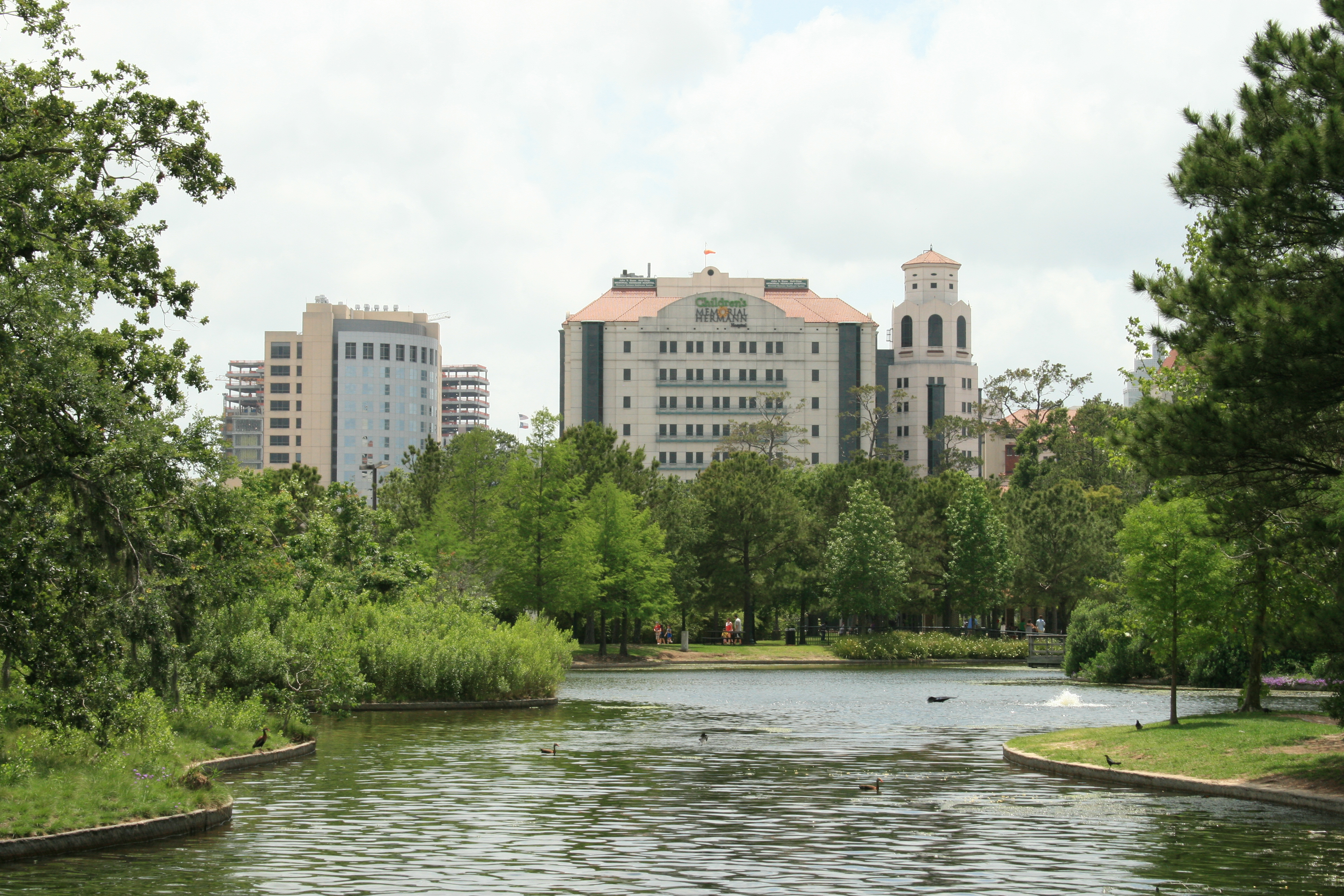

Geography
- Location: 6411 Fannin Street, Houston, Texas, United States
- Coordinates: 29.713855°N 95.395254°W

Organization
- Type: Women's and Children's hospital
- Affiliated university: McGovern Medical School University of Texas Health Science Center at Houston

Services
- Emergency department: Level 1 Pediatric Trauma Center
- Beds: 234 Pediatrics; 76 Women's

Helipads
- Helipad: FAA LID: 38TE: Memorial Hermann Life Flight
Number	Length		Surface
Number	ft	m	Surface
H1	150 x 120	46 × 37	concrete

History
- Opened: 1986

Links
- Website: childrens.memorialhermann.org
- Lists: Hospitals in Texas

Children's Memorial Hermann Hospital (CMHH) is a nationally ranked women's and pediatric acute care teaching hospital located in Houston, Texas. The hospital has 234 pediatric beds and 76 beds for women. CMHH is affiliated with McGovern Medical School at University of Texas Health Science Center at Houston and is a part of the Memorial Hermann Health System. The hospital provides comprehensive pediatric specialties and subspecialties to infants, children, teens, and young adults aged 0–21 throughout Houston and surrounding regions. Children's Memorial Hermann Hospital also sometimes treats adults that require pediatric care. CMHH also features an American College of Surgeons designated Level 1 Pediatric Trauma Center, 1 of 5 in the state. The hospital is located within the vast Texas Medical Center.

== About ==
Children's Memorial Hermann Hospital is located inside Memorial Hermann–Texas Medical Center and is a member institution of the Children's Hospital Association. It houses one of the nation's largest neonatal intensive care units (NICUs) and is one of only two Level IV NICUs in Southeast Texas. The NICU at Children's Memorial Hermann treats more than 1,000 premature infants each year.

The hospital is nationally recognized for The Fetal Center, a subspecialty center made up of maternal-fetal medicine specialists that perform in utero surgery to treat fetuses with birth defects inside the mother's womb before they are born. Affiliated physicians performed the first in utero spina bifida surgery in Texas after the MOMS trial, an NICHD-sponsored study of prenatal and postnatal closure of myelomeningocele.

=== Patient care units ===
The hospital has a variety of patient care units to care for pediatric patients from 0-21, and women requiring obstetrical or gynecological care.

- 30-bed pediatric intensive care unit (PICU)
- 38-bed neonatal special care nursery
- 119-bed neonatal intensive care unit (NICU)
- 76-bed general pediatrics
- 73-bed women's/obgyn

=== Ronald McDonald House ===
The hospital has a Ronald McDonald House located within the hospital that has 14 rooms for families of children that are in the PICU and the NICU. The house originally opened in 2007 on the 7th and 9th floors, and is affiliated with the Ronald McDonald House of Houston. In addition to the house located within the hospital, CHMM families can stay at the nearby 70-bedroom Holcombe House.

== Awards ==
On the 2018-19 U.S. News & World Report: Best Children's Hospitals rankings CMHH ranked as #45 in Pediatric Cardiology & Heart Surgery and #41 in pediatric neurology and heart surgery.

The hospital was ranked nationally in two pediatric specialties on the 2020-21 U.S. News & World Report: Best Children's Hospitals. The hospital ranked #22 in pediatric cardiology and heart surgery, and #31 in pediatric neurology and heart surgery. In addition, CMHH is ranked as the #3 best children's hospital in Texas behind Texas Children's Hospital and Children's Medical Center Dallas.

== See also ==
- University of Texas Health Science Center at Houston
- Texas Children's Hospital
- Texas Medical Center
- List of children's hospitals in the United States
