= Mischer Neuroscience Institute =

Geography
- Location: Texas Medical Center, Houston, Texas, United States
- Coordinates: 29.71506°N 95.397356°W

Organization
- Type: Institute
- Affiliated university: McGovern Medical School at The University of Texas Health Science Center UTHealth
- Patron: The Mary A. and Walter M. Mischer, Sr., Foundation
- Network: Memorial Hermann-Texas Medical Center

Services
- Beds: 172

Helipads
- Helipad: Yes

Links
- Website: med.uth.edu/neurosciences/
- Lists: Hospitals in Texas

The Mischer Neuroscience Institute is a combined research and education effort between the Vivian L. Smith Department of Neurosurgery and the Department of Neurology at McGovern Medical School at UTHealth Houston and Memorial Hermann Hospital. Located in Houston, the Institute draws patients from around the world for specialized treatment of diseases of the brain and spine. It was the first center in Texas and one of only a few institutions in the country to fully integrate neurology, neurosurgery, neuroradiology, neuro-oncology, spine surgery, pain medicine and neurorehabilitation.

== Specialties ==
The Institute is the first stroke program in Texas to meet The Joint Commission’s standards for Comprehensive Stroke Center certification, and focuses on complex stroke care. Its integrated approach led to the creation of one of the Southwest's largest epilepsy programs, a highly ranked neurotrauma program, a cerebrovascular center where affiliated physicians treat more aneurysms and arteriovenous malformations than any other center in the region, an established pediatric neurosurgery program in collaboration with Children's Memorial Hermann Hospital and The University of Texas MD Anderson Cancer Center, a spinal neurosurgery and reconstructive peripheral nerve surgery program and a Brain Tumor Center where physicians diagnose and treat hundreds of new tumor patients each year. Affiliated physicians treat multiple sclerosis, movement disorders, neurocognitive disorders, memory disorders and dementia, neuromuscular disorders, chronic pain and traumatic brain injury.

=== Innovation at the Institute ===
Mischer Neuroscience Institute has multiple firsts:

- The first center to discover a genetic mutation linked to intracranial aneurysms.
- The first stroke program in Texas and the only one in the region to meet The Joint Commission's rigorous standards for Comprehensive Stroke Center certification. In 2018, the Stroke Center at Memorial Hermann-TMC became the first Comprehensive Stroke Center-Integrated System, a new certification created by The Joint Commission specifically for Memorial Hermann.
- Site of the first single-center clinical trial for recurrent medulloblastoma, ependymoma and atypical teratoid-rhabdoid tumors using the direct infusion of chemotherapy into the fourth ventricle; the first trial of infusion of 5-AZA into the fourth ventricle or resection cavity in children with recurrent posterior fossa ependymoma; and the first trial of combination intraventricular chemotherapy (methotrexate and etoposide) infusions into the fourth ventricle or resection cavity in children with recurrent posterior fossa brain tumors.
- The first neurosurgery center to offer all advanced modalities of treatment for complex lesions: expert microsurgery, interventional neuroradiology/endovascular surgery and Gamma Knife® radiosurgery.
- The first hospital in the south-central United States and one of only a few in the country offering intra-arterial chemotherapy for retinoblastoma, the most modern treatment for the disease.
- The first in Texas to use robotic stereo encephalography (SEEG) for 3-D mapping of epileptic seizures.
- The first in Houston to offer amyloid imaging, a diagnostic tool that enables physicians to diagnose Alzheimer's disease.
- The North American leader in studies of primary progressive multiple sclerosis and the most active center in Texas in the conduct of organized clinical trials of new therapies for MS.
- The first facility in Houston and one of the first in the United States to test the clot- dissolving drug tPA for acute stroke.
- One of the first centers in the nation to offer MR-guided laser interstitial thermal therapy (MRgLITT) using the Visualase™ system for the treatment of well-delineated focal epilepsies.
- The first center in the region to use the NeuroPace® RNS® System, an FDA-approved technique for responsive neurostimulation to treat adults with medication-resistant epilepsy.
- The first in the region to inject human central nervous system stem cells into the spines of spinal cord injury patients.

=== Education ===
The Mischer Neuroscience Institute is affiliated with McGovern Medical School at UTHealth Houston Neurosciences. It offers neurosurgery and neurology residencies and fellowships.

The Vivian L. Smith Department of Neurosurgery hosts a seven-year Neurosurgery Residency Program, admitting three PGY(Post-Graduate-Year) residents annually. Residents are individually mentored, evaluated and promoted, and are also regularly asked to evaluate the program and participate in its continual improvement. The program offers one of the largest neurosurgical caseloads in the United States, with more than 4,600 surgical cases per year. Neurosurgical fellowships include cerebrovascular/skull base, neurocritical care, neuroendovascular surgery, stroke and interventional stroke track, multiple sclerosis, movement disorders, neuro-oncology, neuromuscular, epilepsy and spinal and peripheral nerve surgery.

The Department of Neurology provides medical education in clinical neurology at the undergraduate, graduate, and postgraduate levels. Neurological fellowships focus on clinical neurophysiology (including EEG, EEG/video monitoring, EMG, and evoked potentials), vascular neurology, epilepsy, movement disorders, multiple sclerosis/neurovirology, neuroimmunology, and neuropsychology.

=== Research ===
Physicians affiliated with Mischer Neuroscience Institute and McGovern Medical School are engaged in research program focused on the mechanisms, treatment and cure of neurological disease and injury. Research is supported by the National Institutes of Health, the Vivian L. Smith Foundation for Neurologic Disease, the American Stroke Association and other granting agencies. Investigations cover all major areas of neurological disease.

=== UTHealth Houston Neurosciences Clinics ===
UTHealth Houston Neurosciences medical clinics are located both in the Texas Medical Center and throughout the Greater Houston area. The clinics provide 24/7 neuroscience coverage to the city of Houston and outlying suburbs and communities. Clinics are located in the Texas Medical Center, Houston's Greater Heights, Humble, Katy, Memorial City, Pearland, Southeast Houston, Southwest Houston and Sugar Land. UTHealth Houston Neurosciences also includes clinics that bring together specialists who focus on treating brain tumors, spine disorders, movement disorders, radiation oncology, pain management, epilepsy and seizure disorders, memory disorders, nerve and neuromuscular disorders, and pediatric neurology and neurosurgery.
