= Memorial Hermann Life Flight =

Air ambulance service

Memorial Hermann Life Flight is a hospital-based air medical transport service in Houston, Texas. Prior to 2020, Life Flight flew into 12th floor of the John S. Dunn Heli-Stop atop Memorial Hermann Hospital-Texas Medical Center. In March of 2020, Memorial Hermann-TMC opened the new 18 story Sarofim Pavilion, which serves as the home for Life Flight operations in addition to an expanded helipad atop the pavilion. Life Flight was founded in 1976.

== History ==
Service began on August 1, 1976 as the second helicopter air medical program in the United States of America. The founder, Dr. James H. "Red" Duke, Jr., was the medical director for Life Flight from its inception until his death August 25, 2015. To date, Life Flight has flown more than 120,000 patient missions. Life Flight is accredited by the Commission on Accreditation of Medical Transport Systems.

The first helicopter utilized on a Life Flight mission was the French-built SA 319B, also known as the Alouette III. The Alouette served the program well, but was eventually replaced by a newer aircraft, the AS 355 Ecureuil 2, also known as “TwinStar.” The AS 355 boasted many improvements in power, speed, cabin space and stability and was equipped with two turbine engines that greatly improved the safety of operations.

The TwinStar served with Life Flight until the acquisition of the BK 117 helicopter. The BK 117 was built as a joint venture between Messerschmitt-Bölkow-Blohm (MBB) and Kawasaki Heavy Industries. The aircraft is particularly special because of its layout, which allows for complete use of the cabin area. It has no structural beams, or pillars, blocking the cabin space, and it also has large rear “clamshell” doors to use for loading and unloading patient stretchers.

With the addition of the BK117, Life Flight has been able to conduct many specialized transports, including neonatal transport, intra-aortic balloon pump patients, and double patient loads from the same scene.

In addition, Life Flight operated a Bo 105 helicopter, also built by MBB. It featured dual engines, double patient load capacity and a high skid configuration to improve safety around the tail rotor.

In 2007, Life Flight purchased 6 new EC 145 twin-engine helicopters that replaced the 4 that were in use. One is stationed near the Port of Houston to better serve that region and one will be dedicated to pediatric transport. Each Life Flight helicopter can carry up to two patients.

Life Flight has experienced only one fatal crash killing the pilot John Pittman, paramedic Charles R. "Mac" Atteberry and flight nurse Lynn Ethridge. It happened in 1999 and resulted from helicopter manufacturing flaws in the previously used BK-117 helicopter model — the tension torsion strap unraveled, sending the aircraft to the ground.

== Operations ==
Life Flight operates 24 hours a day, 365 days a year within a 150-mile radius of Memorial Hermann-Texas Medical Center, performing more than 3,000 missions each year. This service area includes Southeast Texas and Western Louisiana. The John S. Dunn Helistop is one of the busiest helipads in the world.

== Crew ==
Life Flight's crew is made up of helicopter pilots, flight nurses, flight paramedics, and flight mechanics. The aviation and medical staff have over 250 combined years of medical transport experience.

The medical crew continue their training and education with recurrent skills training and maintain Certified Flight Registered Nurse and Certified Flight Paramedic credentials. Helicopter mechanics are factory trained by Eurocopter, attend manufacturer's training on Turbomeca engines, and are Airframe & Powerplant Certified. Pilots are required to have thousands of hours of flight time and Airline Transport Pilot credentialing, the highest level of aircraft pilot certificate/license, is preferred.

== Current bases ==
Life Flight operates out of five bases in the greater Houston area.

- North Base (Hooks): David Wayne Hooks Memorial Airport 1st through the 15th of the month
- North Base (Woodlands): Memorial Hermann The Woodlands Hospital 16th through 30th of the month
- East Base: Baytown Airport
- South Base: Texas Gulf Coast Regional Airport
- West Base: Memorial Hermann Katy Hospital
- Central Base: John S. Dunn Helistop at Memorial Hermann-Texas Medical Center

== Helicopter features ==
- Pre-hospital blood product administration (PRBC/FFP)
- Portable blood warmers
- Ultrasound diagnostics
- Double load capacity
- Larger cabin permitting for CPR in the aircraft
- Clot-busting agents for STEMI
- Direct access to cath lab for STEMI
- Direct access to CT for stroke
- iStat portable blood analyzer
- Video-assisted intubations
- Hemostatic agents for blood clotting
- Night vision goggles for all crew members
- Twin-engine aircraft allows for higher patient weight loading and faster response times
- Pediatric and neonatal transport

== Gallery ==
Patient being loaded into Life Flight's now retired BK 117 aircraft.

Life Flight lands on scene in western Austin County.

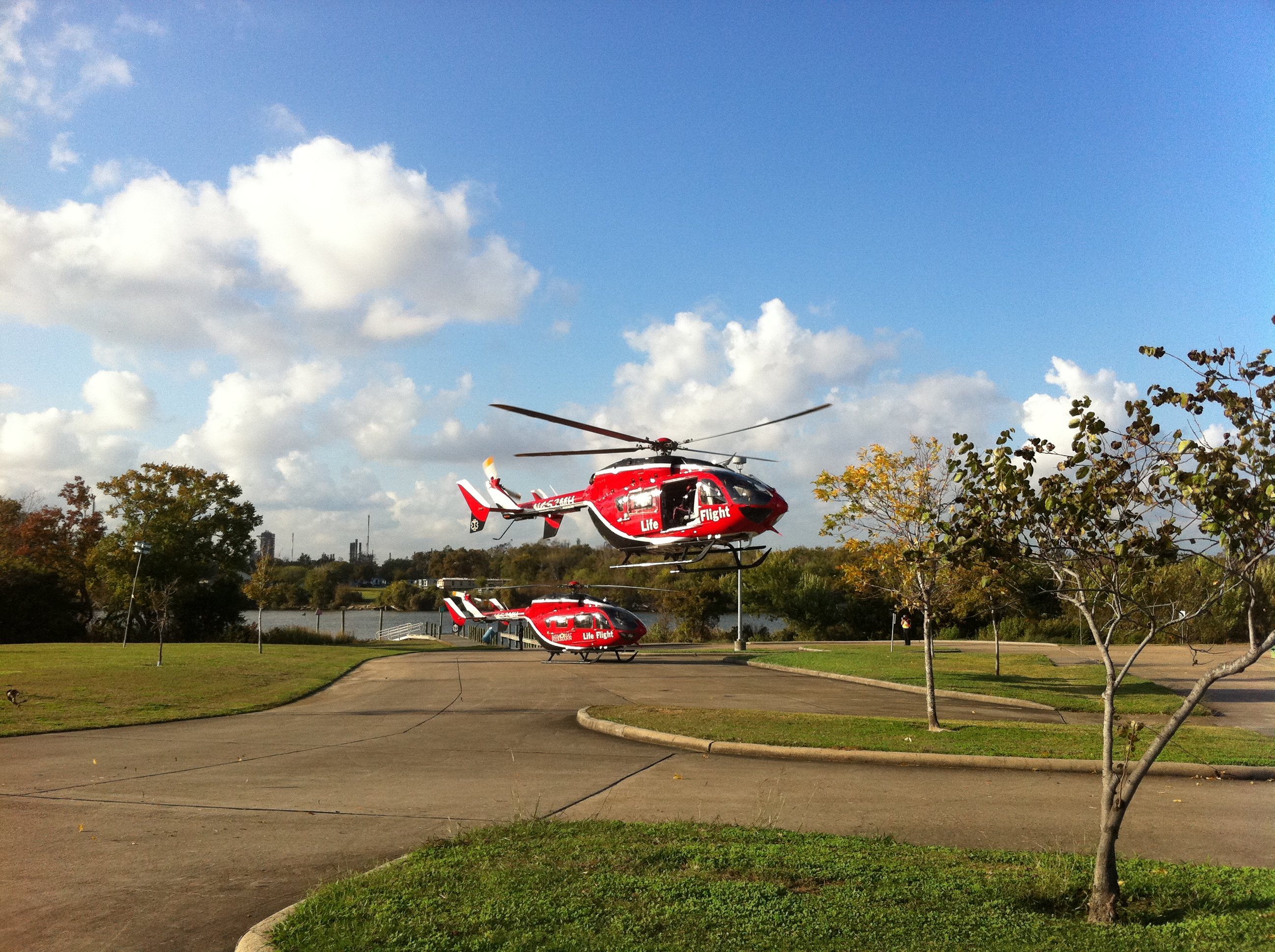
Two EC145 helicopters operated by Memorial Hermann Life Flight

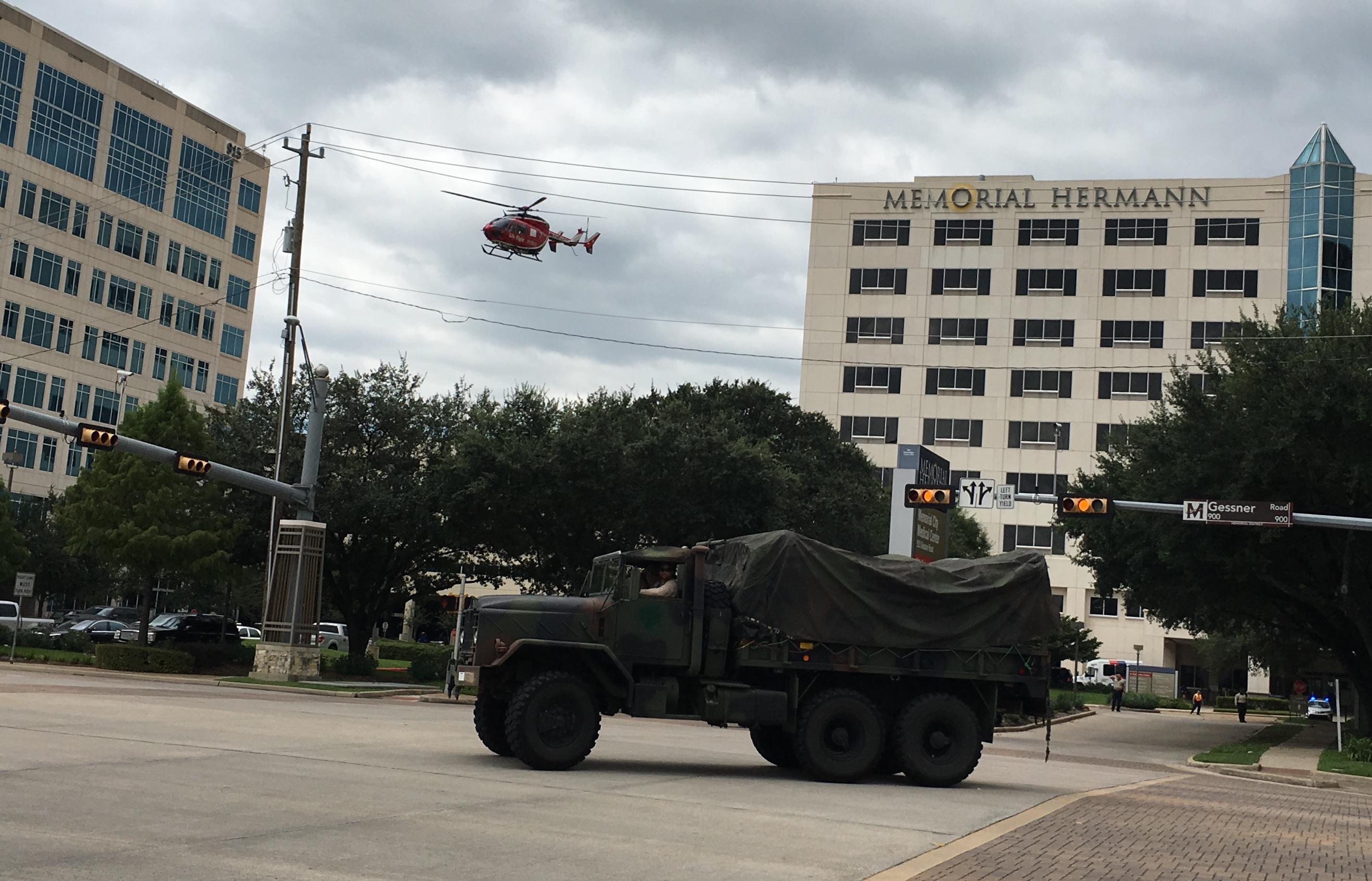
An EC145 Lands at Memorial Hermann Memorial City Medical Center during Hurricane Harvey

== See also ==
- CareFlite
- Travis County STAR Flight
