= Air ambulances in the United States =

Air ambulances in the United States are operated by a variety of hospitals, local government agencies, and for-profit companies. Medical evacuations by air are also performed by the United States Armed Forces (for example in combat areas, training accidents, and United States Coast Guard rescues) and United States National Guard (typically while responding to natural disasters).

== Cost ==
In 2002, the federal government increased the reimbursement for medical flights for Medicare and Medicaid patients. This caused an increase in the number of for-profit ambulance services, which charge much higher rates than non-profit hospitals and expanded services available to people with private health insurance. With lower reimbursements, hospitals could still operate the service as a loss leader because severely injured patients would be incurring significant charges for medical treatment. NPR cited one 2008 case where two patients were transported from the same accident scene to the same hospital, where the hospital charged $1,700 and the private service charged $13,000.

Air Ambulance Membership Programs

Private air ambulance providers in the United States offer membership programs designed to reduce or eliminate the out-of-pocket costs associated with emergency air medical transport. These memberships are typically available to individuals or entire jurisdictions and provide coverage for medically necessary flights within the provider’s service area.

== Why are air ambulances needed in United States? ==
In many cases, patients with minor illnesses can board commercial flights without any issue or without aggravating their health. However, several medical conditions prevent travelers from boarding a plane, because of the risk to other to other passengers and airline staff and because the patient's medical condition can considerable deteriorate while on the plane. In fact, it is not recommended for some patients to board a plane when they are ill.

Several medical conditions prevent patients from boarding a flight because of the complications that may arise. In these cases, patients need constant medical supervision and care. Some examples are:

- Respiratory conditions like pneumonia
- Recent stroke
- Some heart conditions like angina or heart failure
- A recent surgery

In these cases, patients need an air ambulance to travel whether across the United States or to cross international borders. These are equipped as an ICU and have a medical team on board to ensure patient safety.

== List of air ambulances ==
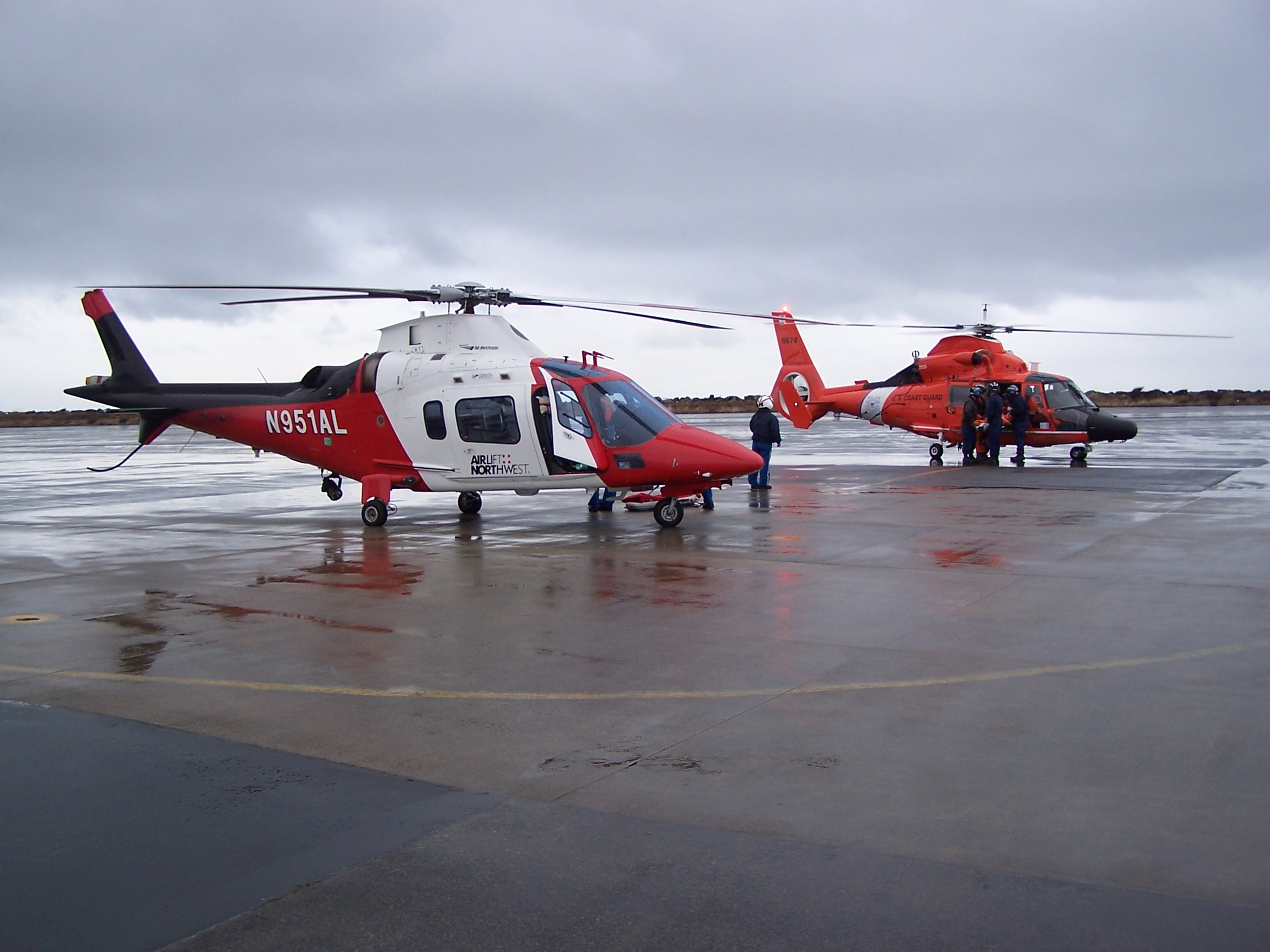
An Airlift Northwest Crew receives a patient transfer from the United States Coast Guard

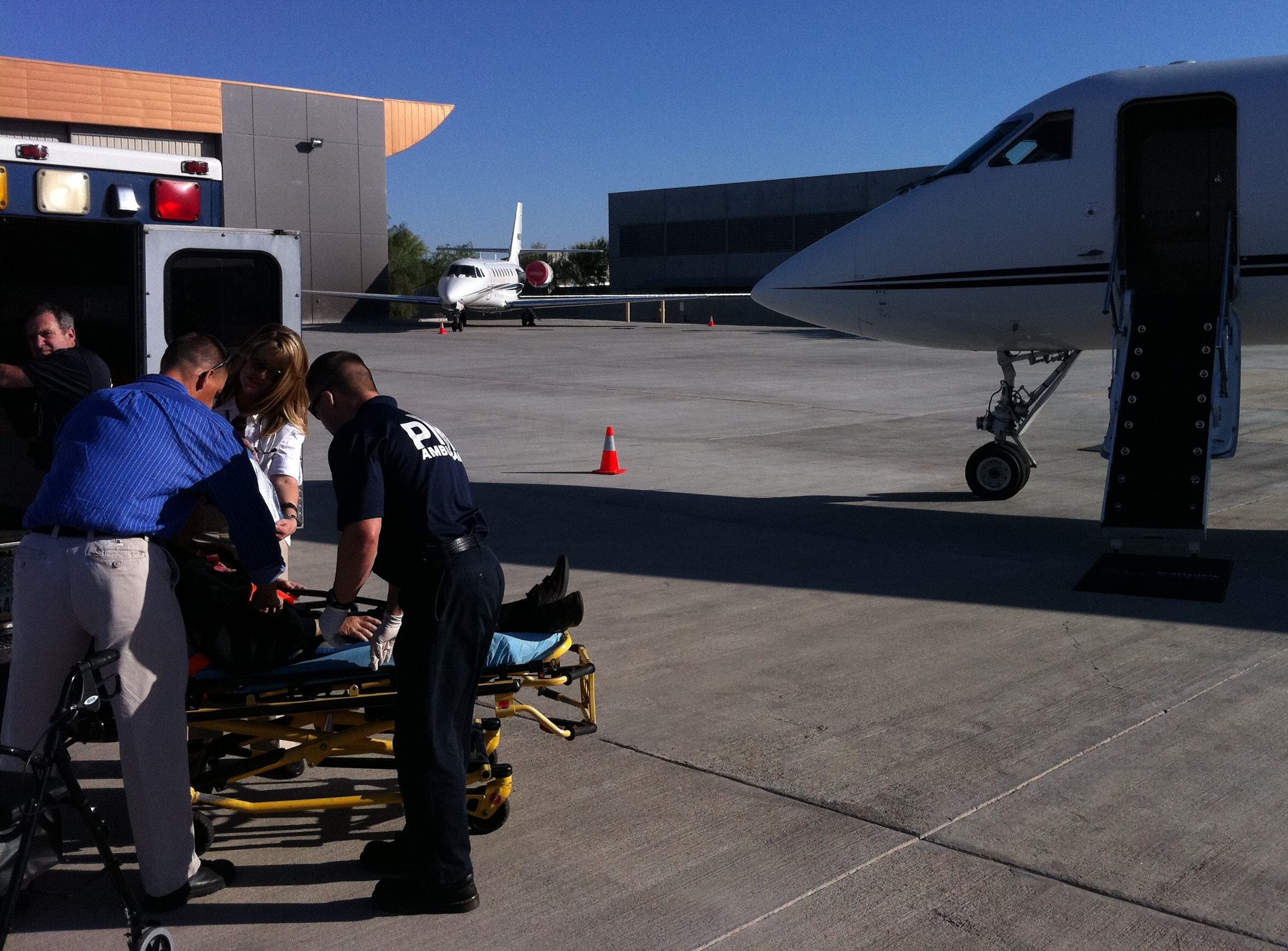
A Mercy Jets crew loading a patient for transport in a Gulfstream Aerospace GIV air ambulance

- Acadian Ambulance & Air Med Services – Headquartered in Lafayette, Louisiana, covers most of the state of Louisiana and parts of western Mississippi.
- Air Evac Lifeteam – the largest medical transport program under one name, covers Alabama, Arkansas, Georgia, Illinois, Indiana, Iowa, Kentucky, Mississippi, Missouri, Ohio, Oklahoma, Tennessee, Texas and West Virginia. Also operates Texas LifeStar in Central Texas.
- Airlift Northwest - non-profit program of the University of Washington School of Medicine and Harborview Medical Center serving Washington, Idaho, Montana, and Alaska.
- AirMed International – Based in Birmingham, Alabama providing long-distance air ambulance transportation within the United States and internationally.
- Air Methods – Largest US air ambulance operator under a single FAA part 135 certificate.
- AMR Air Ambulance – Provides domestic and international air medical transportation using specially equipped fixed wing aircraft.
- ARCH Air Medical Service – Missouri, Illinois, and the surrounding regions.
- Boston MedFlight – Headquartered in Bedford, Massachusetts Boston MedFlight transports emergency patients
- Calstar (California Shock Trauma Air Rescue) is a nonprofit regional air ambulance company serving California and northern Nevada.
- CareFlite – a 501c not-for-profit that is based in Dallas Texas area and sponsored by Baylor Scott & White Hospitals, Parkland Hospital, THR hospitals, JPS Hospital, and Methodist Hospitals.
- CareFlight – serves the Dayton, Ohio region and a 150-mile (240 km) radius to serve much of Southwest Ohio. Based at Miami Valley Hospital
- Critical Air Medicine – Doing business as Critical Air, is based in San Diego, California
- Delaware State Police Aviation Section The Delaware State Police Aviation Section provides 24 hour multi-mission EMS, Law Enforcement, Search and Rescue services to citizens and guest of the State of Delaware. They operate 3 Bell 429’s and a Cessna 182Q. They are staffed by Pilots and Paramedics who are all sworn Delaware State Troopers.
- DHART Dartmouth Hitchcock Advanced Response Team
- EastCare – University Health Systems of Eastern Carolina owned, and operates in Eastern North Carolina
- Flight for Life – many bases of operation across the United States
- Life Flight – Air ambulance based out of the Memorial Hermann Hospital- Texas Medical Center in Houston, Texas.
- Life Flight Network – Largest non-profit air ambulance in the US, serving Oregon, Washington, Idaho, and Montana.
- UT Lifestar - Based out of University of Tennessee Medical Center in Knoxville, Tennessee. Operates from 5 bases in the East Tennessee region and part of the AirMedCare Network of providers.
- Maryland State Police Aviation Command – division focusing on medical evacuation operations. Aviation also supports ground units of the state and local police. Funding comes from vehicle registration fees.
- Medflight – Based out of Columbus, Ohio.
- Mercy Flights – Medford, Oregon. Was the first successful air ambulance in the country, is non-profit. Serves mainly Southern Oregon and Northern California; 150-mile (240 km) radius for helicopter, and almost anywhere West of the Rocky Mountains for the fixed wing airplane, within 1,000 miles (1,600 km) of Medford.
- Metro Life Flight – Cleveland, Ohio, run by MetroHealth, serves the Northeast Ohio area. Operates both air and ground services.
- Omniflight Charleston – Air ambulance service in South Carolinaand part of Georgia.
- STAT Medevac – based in Pittsburgh, Pennsylvania
- Survival Flight – Ann Arbor, Michigan – CAMTS certified critical care transport program of Michigan Medicine, provides rapid and safe transport of critically ill and injured patients of any age group.
- Trauma Hawk Aero-Medical Program – Palm Beach County, Florida taxpayer funded – trauma transport only
- Travis County STAR Flight – Austin, Texas – Public emergency helicopter service for Travis County and surrounding areas.
- University of Wisconsin MedFlight

== See also ==
- Air ambulances in Canada
- Air ambulances in the United Kingdom
- Emergency Aviation in the United Kingdom (disambiguation)
- International SOS, Provider of air ambulance evacuation & repatriation services
- Medical escort
- Medical evacuation
