= Ken Leishman =

Canadian criminal aviator (1931–1979)

Kenneth Leishman
- Born: Kenneth Leishman; June 20, 1931; Holland, Manitoba, Canada
- Died: December 14, 1979 (aged 48); Thunder Bay, Ontario, Canada
- Occupations: Mechanic, door-to-door salesman, thief

Kenneth Leishman (June 20, 1931 – December 14, 1979), also known as the Flying Bandit or the Gentleman Bandit, was a Canadian criminal responsible for multiple robberies between 1957 and 1966. Leishman was the mastermind behind the largest gold theft in Canadian history. This record stood for over 50 years, until it was surpassed by the Toronto Pearson airport heist in 2023. After being caught and arrested by the Royal Canadian Mounted Police (RCMP), Leishman managed to escape twice, before being caught and serving the remainder of his various sentences.

In December 1979, while flying a Mercy Flight to Thunder Bay, Leishman's aircraft crashed about 40 miles (64 km) north of Thunder Bay.

== Early life ==
Leishman was born on June 20, 1931, in the town of Holland, Manitoba. Coming from a troubled home, he dropped out of school before graduating, and worked various jobs before marrying Elva Shields at the age of 17. Sometime in the summer of 1951, Leishman started working as a travelling mechanic for Machine Industries, repairing straw cutters in southern Manitoba. In 1952, he was able to purchase an Aeronca aircraft, using it to fly to the farms he needed to work at, as well as making additional money selling short rides in the aircraft. At some point in the next five years, Machine Industries closed its doors, and Leishman started working for Queen Anne Cookware. He continued working with them until November 1957, when they went bankrupt.

== Criminal career ==
=== First theft ===
On December 17, 1957, Leishman, by posing as a friend of the manager, robbed the Toronto-Dominion Bank on the corner of Yonge Street and Albert in Toronto, Ontario. He got away with $10,000. This was accomplished by arranging to meet the manager to talk about a business loan. Once inside the manager's office, with the door closed for privacy, he produced a gun, and had the manager write him a cheque for $10,000. After receiving the cheque, and questioning the manager for personal information about himself, his family and friends, he coerced the manager into taking him over to a bank teller, and having the cheque cashed. The knowledge gained from the questioning was used to appear as though he was a close friend of the manager. After getting the money, under the pretence of getting a drink, Leishman took the manager with him to the getaway car, then let him go.

=== Attempted theft ===
Three months later, on March 16, 1958, Leishman attempted to rob the CIBC bank on the corner of Yonge Street and Bloor, in Toronto. This time, he was not successful, as the manager, Howard Mason, upon sight of the gun, did not acquiesce to his request. As Leishman attempted to escape the bank, he was tripped by a female customer, before being tackled by a teller less than a block from the bank, and was arrested. He was sentenced to 12 years in prison, to be served at Stony Mountain Penitentiary.

Leishman was paroled on December 21, 1961, and for a time, to support his family, worked as a door-to-door salesman. By 1966, however, with his family having grown to seven children, the income provided by legitimate work was insufficient, and Leishman needed to find another means of supporting his family, reverting to a life of crime.

=== The Great Gold Heist ===
On his most famous robbery, Leishman and four accomplices stole almost $385,000 (just over $3.5 million 2023 dollars) in gold bullion being transported by TransAir to Winnipeg where it would be shipped via Air Canada to Ottawa, Ontario.

While watching aircraft at Winnipeg International Airport as a form of inexpensive entertainment, Leishman had occasionally seen gold shipments from Red Lake being flown into the airport for transport via Air Canada to the mint in Ottawa. While incarcerated in Stony Mountain Institution, he formed the basics of the idea.

Leishman recruited four people to be accomplices in the robbery. Harry Backlin, a Winnipeg lawyer who had befriended Leishman in Stony Mountain was to provide financial backing. John Berry and Richard Grenkow were recruited to be the ones to actually get the gold, as Leishman was too well known to the police to take the gold himself. Grenkow's brother, Paul, was recruited to go to Red Lake in the guise of a salesman to watch for a large shipment to leave.

In addition to this preparation, Leishman also prepared fake Air Canada coveralls by purchasing some winter coveralls, and stenciling the Air Canada logo onto them. Lastly, he acquired some Air Canada waybills from the Air Canada desk at the airport by simply waiting until the desk was unmanned at lunch, and taking what he needed.

On March 1, 1966, the lookout called Leishman to report a large shipment of gold was being delivered. The team put their plan into action. Wearing the fake Air Canada coveralls, Rick and John stole one of the Air Canada trucks, and drove to the tarmac to meet the arriving TransAir aircraft carrying the gold shipment. Pretending to be Air Canada staff, they explained that there had been a change of plans, as there was a charter flight leaving in an hour, and Air Canada wanted to ship the gold out immediately, rather than waiting on the normal flight. As the two were driving an Air Canada truck, had Air Canada uniforms, and had what appeared to be a valid waybill for the shipment, their ruse worked, and the gold was loaded into their truck, and they drove off with the gold.

The gold was then transferred into Leishman's car, and driven to the house of Harry Backlin, his lawyer, who was on vacation with his family. The gold ingots were loaded into his freezer. The plan was to leave the gold there overnight, before moving it to a farm in Treherne, belonging to Leishman's uncle, but a blizzard on March 3 and 4 prevented them from recovering it. Since Backlin had distanced himself from the robbery, the gold could not stay there. Most of the gold bars ended up buried in Backlin's backyard, but were soon unearthed by the local police force who were investigating all of Leishman's suspected associates.

== Later life ==
Imprisoned again as a result of the gold heist and awaiting trial, Leishman, assisted by some accomplices, managed to escape from Headingley Jail in September, 1966, and stole an aircraft from Steinbach, Manitoba, reinforcing his reputation as the "Flying Bandit."

Leishman and his accomplices were arrested after a shootout in Gary, Indiana. In 1975, after his release from prison, Leishman moved to Red Lake, Ontario, to manage Tomahawk Airlines. He was a "model citizen", even being nominated as a candidate for Reeve of the community.

== Death ==
On December 14, 1979, Leishman was piloting a Piper Aztec on a Mercy Flight, when the plane disappeared. It was last heard from just five minutes before it was supposed to land in Thunder Bay. With him on the plane was a patient, Eva Harper, who had broken her hip in a snowmobile accident, and medical escort Janet Meekis. An initial search for the wreckage was called off after 10 days. It was later discovered 40 kilometers north of Thunder Bay on May 3, 1980. The remains were sent to the Centre of Forensic Sciences in Toronto, where both female passengers were identified. However, according to the coroner in the case, the lab was unable to identify Leishman as the third victim. He was declared dead 1 year and 2 days after the crash, on December 16, 1980.

== In popular culture ==
Leishman's exploits caught the fancy of the public, and he became something of a "Robin Hood" figure. A 2005 television documentary, written by Bob Lower and directed by Norma Bailey, entitled Ken Leishman: The Flying Bandit recounts his life and career as a criminal.

Other biographical material about Leishman includes a play (The Flying Bandit (2007) by Lindsay Price), a book (The Flying Bandit by Heather Robertson) and a "non-fiction novel" based on his life, called Bandit: A Portrait of Ken Leishman by Wayne Tefs.
