= Global Medical Response =

Global Medical Response (GMR) is a U.S. based provider of emergency medical services (EMS) through ground ambulance, air medical, emergency response and patient relocation services. Headquartered in Lewisville, Texas, the company operates through a network of subsidiaries and brands that serve communities across the United States as well as worldwide. GMR provides both air and ground medical transportation services.

== History ==
Global Medical Response was formed through the integration and acquisition of multiple emergency medical service providers. Its operating companies include American Medical Response (commonly known as AMR), Air Evac Lifeteam, REACH Air Medical Services, Med-Trans Corporation, Guardian Flight and AirMed International.

In May 2026, Global Medical Response's parent company, GMR Solutions, Inc. became a publicly traded company through an initial public offering (IPO) on the New York Stock Exchange, under the ticker symbol GMRS.

== Operations ==
Global Medical Response companies provide 911 emergency response, interfacility care and transportation, air ambulance services, disaster response support and specialized medical transportation. Through its subsidiaries, the company operates a network of ground ambulances, rotor-wing aircraft, fixed-wing aircraft, communications centers and clinical support teams across the United States and internationally.

Through American Medical Response, Global Medical Response provides disaster-response services and serves as the prime ambulance contractor for Federal Emergency Management Agency (FEMA). GMR personnel and equipment have supported response efforts during major natural disasters, including Hurricane Helene and Hurricane Milton.

== Healthcare innovations ==
=== 911 Nurse Navigation ===
Global Medical Response developed and operates a 911 Nurse Navigation program in certain jurisdictions that allows certain low-acuity 911 callers to be transferred for clinical assessment, using physician-approved guidelines to navigate callers to alternative care options while prioritizing emergency care resources for more critical needs. The program was first implemented with the Washington, D.C. Fire and EMS Department through its "Right Care, Right Now" initiative.

The program is part of a broader effort within emergency medical services to reduce non-emergency ambulance utilization and preserve emergency resources for higher-acuity incidents. Similar nurse navigator programs have been adopted by multiple jurisdictions in the United States, including partnerships involving GMR subsidiaries and local emergency service agencies.

== Subsidiaries and brands ==
Major operating brands of Global Medical Response include American Medical Response, Air Evac Lifeteam, REACH Air Medical Services, Guardian Flight, Med-Trans Corporation and AirMed International. In 2025, Air Evac Lifeateam celebrated its 40th anniversary of serving rural communities in the United States.

== Corporate affairs ==
Global Medical Response is headquartered in Lewisville, Texas. The company serves public-sector agencies, healthcare systems, insurers and individual patients. Its business model focuses on both emergency and non-emergency medical transportation services.

== See also ==
- Emergency medical services in the United States
- Air ambulance
- American Medical Response
- Air Evac Lifeteam
