= Washington Gift of Life Award =

- Type: Certificate
- Awarded for: "act of kindness in donating organs to enhance the lives of others"
- Presented by: Governor of Washington
- Eligibility: deceased persons
- Status: Active
- Established: 1998

Precedence
- Next (higher): Washington Medal of Valor

The Washington Gift of Life Award (formerly the Washington Gift of Life Medal) is one of three statutory civilian decorations and awards issued by the state of Washington, the others being the Washington Medal of Merit and the Washington Medal of Valor. Washington law does not describe an order of precedence for state decorations, though the Washington Gift of Life Award is generally considered inferior to the Medal of Valor and Medal of Merit.

Created by an act of the Washington Legislature in 1998, the Washington Gift of Life Award is given posthumously to individuals whose organ donation has saved the life of another person. The award is presented in certificate form to surviving family members of the deceased recipient. Awards are issued by the Governor of Washington on the nomination of a U.S. Department of Health designated organ procurement organization serving the state of Washington (essentially Pacific Northwest Transplant Bank and LifeCenter Northwest). The authorizing legislation allows the award to be granted six times annually.

== See also ==
- Awards and Decorations of the Washington National Guard
- Washington Law Enforcement Medal of Honor
