= Saudi Air Ambulance =

Servicen run by the Saudi Red Crescent Authority

- Founded: 2009
- Fleet size: 14
- Parent company: Saudi Red Crescent Authority
- Headquarters: Riyadh, Saudi Arabia
- Website: www.srcs.org.sa/%20www.srcs.org.sa

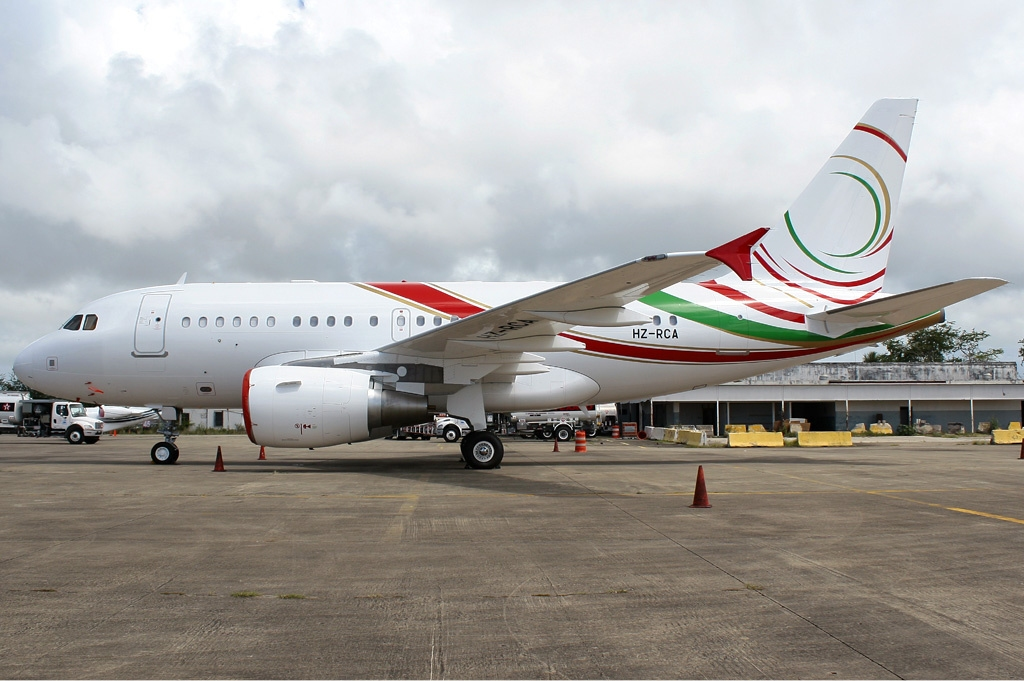
An Airbus ACJ318 Elite, part of the Saudi Red Crescent Authority air rescue fleet, in June 2010

The Saudi Air Ambulance service, started in 2009, is run by the Saudi Red Crescent Authority (SRCA), as part of its provision of emergency medical services in Saudi Arabia. The fleet includes helicopters and fixed-wing aircraft. The service is used for domestic and international intensive care units.

== History ==
The SRCA launched its air ambulance service in December 2009, starting with a fleet of six MD Explorer helicopters based in Riyadh Province. The helicopters were operated by Action Aviation, a British company. In the same month, the fleet expanded with the addition of an Airbus ACJ318 Elite jet.

== Coverage ==
The Air Ambulance service plays a critical role during the Hajj, the annual pilgrimage of Muslims to Mecca, by providing immediate first aid and transporting emergency cases to nearby medical facilities. For the 2018 Hajj season, the service prepared a fleet of eight aircraft dedicated to medical evacuations.

In July 2016 the Saudi Electric Company (SEC) completed the construction of airstrips for air ambulances at its power plants. It had worked with the SRCA to provide quick medical services to company plant authorities, especially those far from hospitals.

== The Air Ambulance service Market ==
The Kingdom of Saudi Arabia air ambulance market size was estimated at US$60.2 million in 2016 and US$78.51 million in 2019. It is expected to reach US$85.67 million in 2020.

== Fleet ==
The Saudi Air Ambulance fleet consists of the following aircraft:

Saudi Air Ambulance
Aircraft	In Fleet	Notes
Bell 412EP	8	Air ambulance helicopter
AgustaWestland AW139	3	Air ambulance helicopter
Sikorsky S-76 C++	2	Air ambulance helicopter
Airbus ACJ318 Elite	1	Air ambulance jet aircraft
Total	14	

== See also ==
- Air ambulance
- Medical escort
- Medical evacuation
