= Saudi Red Crescent Authority =

Humanitarian society in Saudi Arabia

- Founded: 1353 AH (1934)
- Founder: King Abdulaziz Al Saud
- Type: Humanitarian Aid
- Purpose: Humanitarian aid
- Location: Riyadh, Saudi Arabia
- Region served: Saudi Arabia
- Method: Aid agency
- Website: Saudi Red Crescent Authority

The Saudi Red Crescent Authority (SRCA; Arabic: هيئة الهلال الأحمر السعودي, romanized: Hayʼat al-Hilāl al-Aḥmar al-Saʻūdī) is a humanitarian society that provides emergency medical services in five administrative regions of the Kingdom of Saudi Arabia. It was founded in 1934 under the name Saudi Red Crescent Association, which was later amended to Saudi Red Crescent Authority in 2008. By 2009, the Society had 447 First Aid Centers, run by 5,507 staff, with 1300 ambulances which are distributed in all hospitals and centres around the country. The Red Crescent has a particular role to play during Hajj (the annual pilgrimage to Mecca), providing on-the-spot first aid and using its fleet of vehicles (1300 in 2009) to take emergency cases to the nearest medical facility.

The Saudi Red Crescent Authorities offer medical service of first aid to those in the kingdom in ordinary circumstances and at time of catastrophes. The Authority contributes relief work inside the Kingdom and abroad. In 2009, the Saudi Red Crescent Authority launched the Saudi Air Ambulance, a fleet of helicopters and fixed-wing aircraft.

== Establishment of the National Medical Emergency Association ==
It was the first independent medical entity in the Kingdom of Saudi Arabia, as no previous organizational association for ambulatory services existed before the year of 1934. That idea to form the authority arose due to the war between Saudi Arabia and Yemen. Battles broke out in mountains of Asir and Tihamah coasts where no convenient facilities or medical supplies for the wounded civilians and militants were available. The need was also recognized to transport patients from their homes or roadsides when experiencing an emergency.

== Ambulance Charity Association ==
As the government of the late King Faisal bin Abdul-Aziz believed in the necessity of providing ambulatory medical care the idea of establishing the association for provision of ambulance transport was proposed in the year of 1934. They noticed in Mecca the difficulties encountered by pilgrims while performing Hajj rituals. Heatstroke, exhaustion due to diseases and the age issues afflicted pilgrims and their families at the time. Those problems increased as the numbers of pilgrims increased, the problem of illness, death, and delays in medical referral among pilgrims was recognized as a problem.
