= Lorain County Regional Airport =

- IATA: ~~LPR~~; ICAO: KLPR; FAA LID: LPR

Summary
- Airport type: Public
- Owner/Operator: Lorain County Board of Commissioners
- Serves: Lorain / Elyria, Ohio
- Location: New Russia Township
- Opened: November 4, 1968
- Time zone: UTC−05:00 (-5)
  - Summer (DST): UTC−04:00 (-4)
- Elevation AMSL: 793 ft (242 m)
- Coordinates: 41°20′39.4″N 082°10′39.5″W
- Website: www.loraincountyohio.gov/313/Regional-Airport

Map
- Location of airport in Ohio LPR (the United States)

Runways
Direction	Length		Surface
Direction	ft	m	Surface
7/25	5,002	1,525	Asphalt

Statistics (2022)
- Aircraft operations: 21,900
- Based aircraft: 88
- Source: Federal Aviation Administration

Lorain County Regional Airport (IATA: ~~LPR~~, ICAO: KLPR, FAA LID: LPR) located in New Russia Township, is a public airport in Lorain County, Ohio. The airport is owned by the Lorain County Board of Commissioners and is about 7 miles south of Lorain, between Elyria about 5 miles to the northeast and Oberlin to the south-southwest. The National Plan of Integrated Airport Systems for 2011–2015 categorized it as a general aviation reliever airport.

The airport holds a regular Discover Aviation Day. The event features vintage aircraft, warbirds, homebuilt aircraft, gliders, and more.

== History ==
Plans to build an airport in Lorain County began as early as September 1964, when a study proposed locating one of two new airports for Greater Cleveland there. Concrete steps started in late February 1966, when an airport authority was established. After a 1,045-acre (423 ha) site was endorsed by the FAA in early May, the authority stated it would seek Federal aid. In late June 1966, Lorain agreed to raise $92,000 to build the airport. Elyria followed suit by voting to provide $192,000 a week and a half later. The day after it received an approximately $320,000 Federal grant in mid December, the airport authority announced it would be soliciting contracts before the end of the month.

A group led by a professor at Oberlin College was founded in February 1967 to oppose the proposed location of the airport and within a few weeks it considered a plan for a referendum on the issue. A public hearing on the subject was held by the FAA less than a month later. It was discovered in late March that insufficient funds in the city of Elyria's coffers could prevent the construction of the airport. Despite the approval of plans for the airport by the FAA in May, a supportive ruling by a judge regarding matching local funds in early June, and the awarding of a construction contract later that month, a series of noise tests was ordered in July. Federal money for the airport was finally made available following the signing of an agreement in October. The airport opened on 4 November 1968.

The airport authority president resigned in January 1969 amidst an investigation into a potential conflict of interest involving his role in land acquired for the facility. Operation of the airport was transferred to a private company in mid-1971 after it had lost $50,000 since opening. By June 1973, the airport was seeking funds to construct a taxiway to reduce congestion. In September 1978, Midwest Air Charter, a cargo airline that had built a business flying uncleared checks, announced it had purchased the Wilmington Air Park and would be relocating there. The airline, which planned to purchase larger jets that would need a longer runway than was available at Lorain County, had made up the majority of flights from the airport. As a result, the airport was expected to operate at a loss and was forced to ask for money from local authorities.

In 1982, it was announced that the 316th Medical Evacuation Unit of the U.S. Army Reserve would be moving from Cleveland-Hopkins International Airport to Lorain County with its helicopters. By early March 1983, the airport was attempting to negotiate between three different cities for the construction of a sewer line. Yet, despite a compromise to involve two of the three being reached, a dispute led to neither providing the service. (Note: At the same time, three inches of pavement were added to the runway to support larger aircraft.) By 1987, it was still attempting to have a connection made. The airport received a federal grant to construct a taxiway in mid September 1989.

The Cleveland Wing of the Confederate Air Force began holding annual airshows at the airport in 1989. The first plane assigned to the unit, an SNJ-4, arrived at the airport in mid January 1991. By early August 1992, the wing was planning to move to the airport and hoped to establish an aviation museum there. By early June 1995, the group, since renamed the American Air Heritage Foundation, intended to break ground on a facility within a few months. However, by early August 1996, it had shifted its efforts for a museum to the Lost Nation Airport.

Following approval by state lawmakers in June 1994, planning for a 150-acre (61 ha) industrial park at the airport began. In mid February 1996, it was announced that the 316th Medical Evacuation Unit would close. The unit had been the biggest customer of fuel for the fixed-base operator. Four months later, questions were being raised over the value of the airport to the community. A proposal to extend the runway to 7,000-foot (2,100 m) in January 1997 was opposed by local residents. At the same time, Lorain and Elyria threatened to stop paying their combined two-thirds of the airport's budget. A study, released in February 1998, projected that cargo flights would not offset the cost of the extension. A rally held at Oberlin College in early December again resisted growth of the airport. By early March 1999, two companies were vying to operate the airport.

The airport was the center of controversy in 2005 when the Lorain County Commissioners met in private and voted on whether to take over the airport. The American Civil Liberties Union challenged the meeting's private nature, calling the action a violation of people’s right to information about decisions that affect them. The Commissioners eventually rescinded their vote and met again in public. By early January 2006, the airport manager was attempting to cancel his contract as a result of a dispute with the county. A few months later, the airport submitted a plan to the FAA to extend the runway – although to a length of 500 feet (150 m) shorter than the previous attempt. Construction on 48 new hangars was to begin in mid September 2007. One of Metro LifeFlight's helicopters moved to the airport in early April 2009.

The airport received $69,000 in federal stimulus from the CARES Act to help it weather the COVID-19 pandemic. In 2023, the airport received another $500,000 grant from the Ohio Department of Transportation to improve the airport. Funding for a plan to build a 1,000-acre (4,000,000 m^{2}) megasite near the airport and extend the runway to 6,500 ft (2,000 m) was announced in July 2025.

== Facilities and aircraft ==
Lorain County Regional Airport covers 1,149 acres (465 ha) at an elevation of 793 feet (242 m) above mean sea level. It has one asphalt runway, 7/25, 5,002 by 100 feet (1,525 x 30 m).

In the year ending September 28, 2020 the airport had 21,900 aircraft operations, an average of 60 per day: 94% general aviation and 6% air taxi. This is down from 42,610 operations in 2010. In 2022 88 aircraft were based at the airport: 70 single-engine and 7 multi-engine airplanes as well as one helicopter and one glider.

The airport has a fixed-base operator that has fuel, both avgas and jet fuel, as well as aircraft maintenance, catering, hangars, courtesy transportation, a conference room, a crew lounge, and more.

== Accidents and incidents ==
- On 9 August 1975, two Cessna 150s collided while landing at the airport, killing a pilot and injuring 2 others.
- On 27 April 1979, a Piper PA-31T Cheyenne twin-engine turboprop business aircraft crashed while landing at the airport during a training flight, killing the two pilots.
- On 19 February 1986, a Cessna 182 crashed while landing at the airport, killing the pilot and injuring 4 passengers.
- On 25 July 1995, a Rutan Quickie homebuilt aircraft performing a staggered formation takeoff broke in half after crashing due to propwash from the Hiperbipe homebuilt aircraft taking off ahead of it.
- On February 19, 2002, a Hughes 269C was substantially damaged during a takeoff attempt from a platform at the Lorain County Regional Airport. The pilot reported he lifted the helicopter off the platform "quickly." As the aircraft climbed, it began a turn to the right, and the pilot applied left pedal to counteract. As the pilot continued to increase the collective, the helicopter began a 360-degree "aggravated spin" to the right. The pilot then "chopped" the throttle and the collective, and the helicopter "dropped fast." He added a slight amount of collective before landing, and the spin to the right became more aggravated. The helicopter then impacted the platform and rolled over onto its side. The probable cause of the accident was found to be the pilot's failure to maintain directional control during takeoff.
- On September 1, 2005, a Dessault Falcon 20D operated by USA Jet Airlines on a cargo flight to Saint Louis-Lambert International Airport crashed while taking off from the Lorain County Regional Airport. The aircraft impacted a flock of birds while on its takeoff run, ingesting them into both engines and causing the first engine to fail. The aircraft climbed for 10 seconds when the stall warning sounded. The pilot flying adjusted the flight controls for landing, and the airplane contacted the runway straight-and-level 3,000 feet after rotation. The airplane overran the runway, struck a fence, crossed a road, and came to rest in a cornfield about 1,000 feet beyond the initial point of ground contact. The probable cause of the accident was found to be the ingestion of multiple birds in each engine at takeoff, which resulted in a complete loss of engine power.
- On May 15, 2003, a Cessna 208B Super Cargomaster crashed after departure from Lorain County Regional Airport. When the pilot leveled off after departure, the low fuel pressure light illuminated, and the fuel flow was lower than normal. There was no change when the pilot turned on the boost pump and ignition, and the low fuel pressure light remained activated. The pilot advanced the power lever to full, but there was no response from the engine, and the pilot heard what he thought was a decreasing engine noise. The pilot subsequently performed a forced landing. The probable cause was found to be the pilot's failure to verify the position of the fuel selectors prior to takeoff, which resulted in a power loss due to fuel starvation.
- On January 18, 2010, a Mitsubishi MU-2 turboprop crashed on approach, killing four.
- On May 23, 2015, a Vans RV-6A was damaged while landing at the Lorain County Regional Airport During the landing flare, the left wing lifted up and the stall warning horn sounded. The airplane immediately descended, impacted the ground, and slid off the runway. The probable cause of the accident was found to be the pilot's failure to maintain airplane attitude control during the landing flare, which resulted in an aerodynamic stall, hard landing, and runway excursion.
- On June 30, 2019, a Piper J-3C Cub crashed just outside the airport, killing the pilot.
- On November 17, 2019, a Navion aircraft landed gear-up at the Lorain County Regional Airport.

== See also ==
- List of airports in Ohio
