= Washington Law Enforcement Medal of Honor =

- Type: Medal
- Awarded for: "exceptionally honorable and meritorious conduct in performing services as a law enforcement officer"
- Presented by: Governor of Washington
- Eligibility: commissioned peace officers, living or deceased
- Status: Active
- Established: 1994

The Washington Law Enforcement Medal of Honor is the only state decoration issued by the state of Washington to law enforcement officers, and is established by the Revised Code of Washington. (Individual municipal jurisdictions issue lesser awards to law enforcement officers and the state has three statutory civilian decorations: the Washington Medal of Merit, Washington Medal of Valor and the Washington Gift of Life Award). Washington law does not describe an order of precedence for state decorations and the Washington Law Enforcement Medal of Honor is not customarily placed in relation to other state decorations.

== Medal ==
=== Qualifications ===
All law enforcement officers in the state of Washington (including both those commissioned under the authority of state of Washington, as well as those of the United States), living or dead, who have been seriously injured or killed while in the performance of duty, or who have been distinguished by exceptionally meritorious conduct, are eligible to receive the medal from the Governor of Washington. In issuing the medal, the Governor acts on the recommendation of the "law enforcement medal of honor committee," which consists of the Attorney-General of Washington, a representative of the Governor, and delegates from four police associations.

While any person is eligible to nominate a law enforcement officer for the Washington Law Enforcement Medal of Honor, all nominations must be seconded by a sheriff or chief of police of the state of Washington before being submitted to the committee for consideration.

=== Design and presentation ===
The Washington Law Enforcement Medal of Honor is bronze. It depicts the Seal of Washington centered on the obverse side surrounded by the words "Law Enforcement Medal of Honor." The reverse of the decoration is inscribed with the words "for exceptionally honorable and meritorious conduct in performing services as a law enforcement officer." By custom, the medal is annually awarded by the Governor to a slate of recipients during the first week of May in a ceremony held at the Peace Officers Memorial in Olympia, Washington.

The medal is worn as a neck decoration, and is the only non-military neck award issued by Washington.

== Background ==
The Washington Law Enforcement Medal of Honor was established in 1994 by an act of the Washington Legislature.

As of 2014, Seattle police officer David Sires, who was shot to death while pursuing suspect Benjamin Payne in October 1881, is the longest deceased officer to have received the Law Enforcement Medal of Honor, which was posthumously awarded in 1998 (Sires' last living relative having died in 1939, the medal was accepted on his behalf by a representative from the Seattle police department).

== See also ==
- Awards and Decorations of the Washington National Guard
- Public Safety Officer Medal of Valor
