= Washington Medal of Valor =

- Type: Medal
- Awarded for: "exceptionally valorous service, given in the act of saving the life of another"
- Presented by: Governor of Washington
- Eligibility: All persons, living or deceased, except those employed in "hazardous professions."
- Status: Active
- Established: 1999
- First award: 2006

Highlights
- Total: 8

Precedence
- Next (higher): Washington Medal of Merit
- Next (lower): Washington Gift of Life Award

The Washington Medal of Valor is one of three statutory civilian awards and decorations issued by the state of Washington, the others being the Washington Medal of Merit and the Washington Gift of Life Award (the state also issues the Washington Law Enforcement Medal of Honor and a number of military decorations). Washington law does not describe an order of precedence for state decorations, though the Medal of Valor is generally considered the state's second-highest honor, after the Medal of Merit.

== Medal ==
=== Qualifications ===
The Medal of Valor is awarded for valorous actions done to save the life of another person and undertaken at risk of injury or death.

All persons, living or dead, except persons employed in "hazardous professions" (specifically including police and firefighters), are eligible for the medal. The medal is bestowed by the Governor of Washington on the advice of the "medal of valor committee," which is composed of the governor himself, as well as the chief justice of the Washington State Supreme Court, the speaker of the Washington State House of Representatives, and the president of the Washington State Senate. The Washington Secretary of State serves as the committee's secretary. The process for nomination is not set by law, but, under current rules adopted by the committee, any person may nominate a qualified candidate through submission of a letter of nomination to the secretary of state who periodically presents received nominations to the committee for consideration.

=== Design and presentation ===
State law requires that the Medal of Valor "be of .999 pure silver and shall consist of the seal of the state of Washington, surrounded by a raised laurel wreath and suspended from a silver bar device inscribed "For Valor" which is suspended from a ring attached by a dark green ribbon, bordered by silver." In addition to the recipient's name, the reverse reads "for exceptionally valorous service, given in the act of saving the life of another." By custom, the medal is awarded by the Governor during a joint session of the Washington State Senate and Washington State House of Representatives at the Washington State Capitol specially convened for the purpose of presenting the award. The authorizing legislation does not specify a frequency for issuing the medal, and it has generally been awarded sparsely and irregularly.

Currently, medals are struck by the Northwest Territorial Mint, a private mint located in Dayton, Nevada.

== Background ==
=== History ===
The Medal of Valor was established by an act of the Washington Legislature, introduced by state senator Don Benton, in 1999. The first medals were presented in 2006.

=== Recipients ===
- James Swett of Sedro Wooley, Washington received the Medal of Valor in 2006. In 2004 Swett happened upon a fiery car accident on Interstate 5 near Smokey Point, Washington. Swett smashed the window of one of the involved vehicles to gain access to the driver, whom he dragged from the wreck. He then improvised a tow cable which he used to pull the vehicle, which was in danger of being engulfed in flame, to safety, before prying open a door to rescue two injured children who were trapped inside.
- Gregory Meinhold of Everett, Washington received the Medal of Valor in 2006. In 2001 Meinhold spotted a man and a dog in Silver Lake both of whom appeared to be drowning. Meinhold rushed to a nearby restaurant and expropriated a decorative canoe that was on display. He launched the boat into the lake, using it to successfully rescue both the man and the dog.
- Travis Jackson and Dennis Kinsey of Clark County, Washington each received a Medal of Valor in 2006. In 2005 Jackson and Kinsey discovered a Jeep engulfed in flame outside Orchards, Washington. The two used a fire extinguisher to subdue the flames before extricating the driver, calling 911, and then administering first aid to the injured man until paramedics arrived.
- Edward Marsette of Auburn, Washington received the Medal of Valor in 2007. While at home in 2006 Marsette heard a loud crash. Upon investigation, he discovered a car had overturned and burst into flames on the street outside his house. Marsette raced to the vehicle and pulled four people to safety, suffering second and third degree burns in the process. As the first police officer arrived, ammunition from a loaded pistol stored in the vehicle began to detonate due to the intensity of the fire. Despite being badly injured from the burns he'd suffered rescuing the vehicle's passengers, Marsette ran several hundred yards to warn the approaching officer to stop and proceed with caution due to the igniting bullets.
- Alana Schutt of Snohomish County, Washington received the Medal of Valor in 2007. In 2006 Schutt saw a distressed boat in Martha Lake. Schutt used a paddle boat to reach the sinking vessel, aiding three men into it. Her own boat over capacity, Schutt then jumped into the lake and swam to shore, pulling the paddle boat behind her.
- Timothy Bourasaw and Rick Bowers of Arlington, Washington each received a Medal of Valor in 2007. In 2006 Bourasaw and Bowers discovered two persons trapped in a vehicle engulfed in flame on Interstate 5. They extricated the two passengers, one of whom was on fire, and cared for them until emergency services arrived.

== See also ==
- North Carolina Award
- Order of British Columbia
