= Toronto Pearson International Airport heist =

2023 Canadian heist

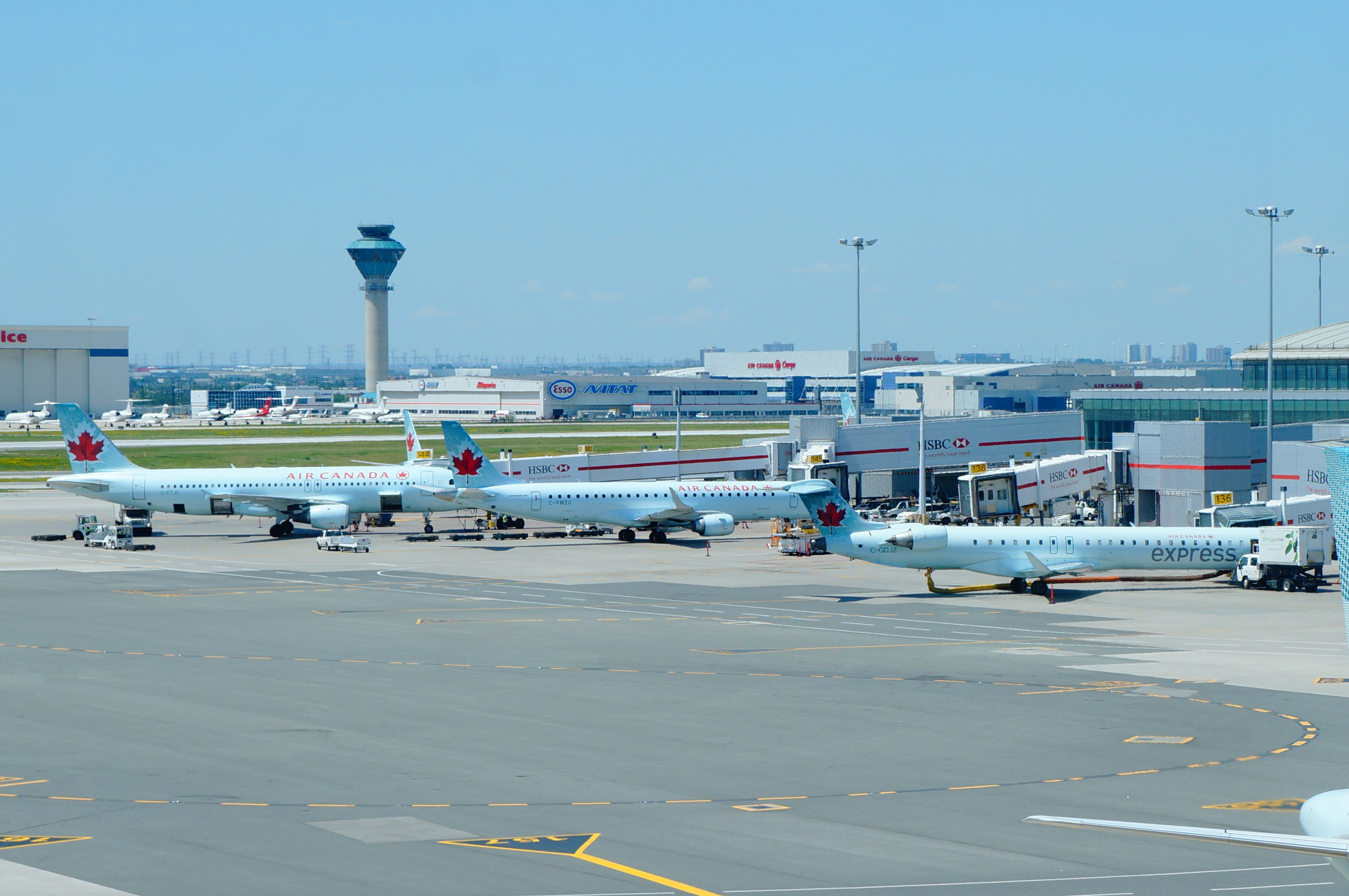
- Toronto Pearson International Airport flight lines
- Date: April 17, 2023
- Location: Toronto Pearson International Airport, Toronto, Ontario, Canada; 43°40′36″N 079°37′50″W
- Outcome: More than C$20 millions of items stolen
- Missing: Foreign currency and gold

On April 17, 2023, a major theft occurred at Toronto Pearson International Airport in Canada, with over C$20 million (US$15 million) worth of cash and gold in foreign currency being stolen. In the evening of Monday, April 17, a container with gold bars and foreign currency was offloaded from an inbound aircraft and transferred to an Air Canada holding facility at the airport, where Air Canada staff were tricked with a forged shipping document into loading it onto a getaway truck. Nine people have been charged with the heist. According to Peel Regional Police lead investigator Det.-Sgt. Mike Mavity, the theft was the single largest gold heist in Canadian history. According to the Gold Bullion Company, a British group that monitors such events, it was the sixth-largest gold theft in recorded history.

== Background ==
In 2023, two Swiss companies wanted to ship valuables from Switzerland to Canada, and each arranged with Brink’s Switzerland Ltd. to handle the logistics and compensate for any transit losses. Valcambi, a Swiss precious metals refinery, wanted to ship 660 gold bars weighing in total 400 kilograms (880 lb) to the Toronto-Dominion Bank; the gold was then worth about C$24 million. The gold was 99.9% pure. Raiffeisen Schweiz, a Swiss retail bank, wanted to ship currency to the Vancouver Bullion and Currency Exchange, a shipment worth about C$2.7 million and weighing 53 kilograms (117 lb). In mid-April 2023, Brink's arranged with Air Canada to ship the gold and currency in one container from Switzerland to Toronto. The container which was holding the valuables was 0.46 square metres (5.0 sq ft) in size.

There were various estimates for the value of stolen gold, originally reported as a little over C$20 million. Authors of a June 2024 CBC News article point out that the oft-reported figure is substantially inaccurate based on the heist day international gold trading; the amount was "actually worth C$34.365 million in April 2023 and approaching C$41 million today... CBC News reached out to Brink's, TD Bank, and Valcambi, the Swiss refiner, as well as Peel Police, to ask about the apparent discrepancy. No one would answer the question [about the discrepancy]."

== Heist ==
On April 17, 2023, Air Canada Flight 881, carrying the valuables, departed Zürich, Switzerland at 1:25 PM local time and arrived in Toronto at 3:56 PM local time. Flight 881 was operated by Air Canada Boeing 777-300ER, the largest aircraft in Air Canada's fleet, and was registered as C-FITL.

At 5:50 PM, the Brink's container containing the gold and foreign currency was transferred from the airplane to an Air Canada holding facility at the airport. At 6:32 PM, a five-tonne truck pulled into an Air Canada cargo bay. Its driver presented a forged shipping document. Air Canada staff loaded the container of gold and foreign currency onto the truck using a forklift. After being loaded, the truck travelled on Dixon Road, west on Highway 401, and then turned off into a rural area north of Milton. A few hours later, a Brink's Canada truck showed up to pick up the shipment. Air Canada staff tried to find the container, but an internal investigation concluded it was missing. At 2:43 AM on the next day, the theft was reported to Peel Regional Police. The forged shipping document was an altered copy of a genuine waybill for a container of seafood that had been picked up from the Air Canada holding facility on the prior day. The forged document was printed on a printer within the Air Canada holding facility.

== Investigation ==
On April 20, 2023, the Royal Canadian Mounted Police officials confirmed that Peel Regional Police would be investigating the heist. Peel Regional Police inspector Stephen Duivesteyn said their team would investigate "all avenues" and described the incident as "isolated" and "very rare". Peel Regional Police and the U.S Bureau of Alcohol, Tobacco, Firearms and Explosives (ATF) would start a joint investigation, dubbing it "Project 24K" with 24K meaning 24 gold karats. The ATF was involved as some of those suspected were also involved in illegal arms trafficking. After examining CCTV surveillance footage from 225 businesses and residences, police traced the route of the getaway vehicle with the stolen gold. From the Air Canada warehouse, it ran westbound on Highway 401 and north on Bronte Road past a church north of Milton, after which the trail disappeared.

On April 17, 2024, Peel Regional Police, along with the ATF, announced the results of its joint investigation. Nineteen charges were laid, six arrests were made, and three Canada-wide arrest warrants were issued. Police recovered some $430,000 in cash, about $89,000 worth of gold jewelry ornaments, and equipment capable of smelting gold to facilitate its sale. Police had also seized the getaway truck. Peel police Chief Nishan Duraiappah said that the theft was well planned by an organized crime syndicate. Two Air Canada employees were involved in carrying out the theft, according to lead investigator Det. Sgt. Mike Mavity. According to Mavity, police believe the stolen gold bars were melted down and sold through both domestic and overseas markets. Police seized two lists showing how the cash proceeds from the disposal of the gold were distributed among the gang members. One list showed $10.23 million distributed, and the other $9.94 million. As of 2026, investigators have recovered about one kilogram of gold and several hundred thousand dollars in currency believed to be from the heist, and seized smelting equipment.

By July 2024, the investigation had cost Peel Regional Police $5.3 million with an estimated cost to complete of $10 million. Police believe that very little of the gold was melted down in a jewelry store at Mississauga, Ontario and that the bulk of it may have been sent to Dubai, United Arab Emirates and India, where dealers would melt down gold bars with serial numbers.

== Suspects ==
By April 2024, Peel Regional Police had charged nine individuals for involvement in the theft. In 2026, one suspect was convicted and prosecutors dropped charges against three other individuals.

As of October 2026, the six suspects still charged or convicted were:

- Durante King-McLean, the alleged driver of the getaway truck, was charged with theft over $5,000 and possession of proceeds of a crime. Peel police have issued an arrest warrant for him. Police discovered King-McLean's fingerprint on the getaway vehicle. However, he had already been arrested since September 2023 in Pennsylvania for arms trafficking; in a traffic stop, police found 65 firearms in his rental car. As of April 2025, he has struck a plea bargain with U.S. authorities on the gun charges, subject to court approval. He faced 35 years in prison, which would be reduced to a maximum of 15 years with the possibility of serving time in Canada. He would be permanently barred from the United States. Ultimately, in June 2026, he received a 160-month sentence for gun smuggling.
- Prasath Paramalingam was charged by Peel police as an accessory after the fact of an indictable offence. He was also wanted by U.S. authorities in Pennsylvania for allegedly providing money to King-Mclean to purchase firearms. A U.S. grand jury has already indicted him on charges of firearms trafficking, aiding and abetting, and conspiracy. After being released on bail, Paramalingam disappeared and remained at large until he was recaptured in Cancun, Mexico in November 2026.
- Parmpal Sidhu, an Air Canada employee at the time of his arrest, was charged with theft over $5,000 and conspiracy to commit an indictable offence. His trial started October 5, 2026, where he elected to be tried by judge alone and pleaded not guilty.
- Archit Grover was charged with theft over $5,000 and conspiracy to commit an indictable offence. U.S. authorities also wanted him for firearms trafficking. Peel Police arrested Grover on May 20, 2024, at Pearson Airport after disembarking from a flight from India. As of October 2026, Grover awaits trial.
- Arsalan Chaudhary was charged with theft over $5,000, possession of property obtained by crime, and conspiracy to commit an indictable offence. He was allegedly the person most involved in planning the heist. Peel police had issued a Canada-wide warrant for his arrest, but he fled to Dubai. On January 12, 2026, Chaudhary returned to Canada to voluntarily surrender to police. In March 2026, Chaudhary pleaded guilty to plotting the theft, and received a four-year sentence; he must also pay back $22 million in restitution within 40 years. Chaudhary was considered one of the masterminds in the heist.
- Simran Preet Panesar was a manager for Air Canada who resigned from that position in the summer of 2023 and moved to India. After the theft, he gave Peel police a tour of the Air Canada facility before he became a suspect. Peel police have issued a Canada-wide warrant for his arrest. He was charged with theft over $5000 and conspiracy to commit an indictable offence. In June 2024, Panesar, through his lawyer, announced he would voluntarily return to Canada to surrender to police after spending a couple of weeks arranging his personal affairs. He said that he hoped to demonstrate his innocence. However, he remained in India and as of April 2025 lived in Punjab. India’s Enforcement Directorate, suspecting violations of the Prevention of Money Laundering Act, raided four locations associated with Panesar and questioned him, but no charges were laid.

In 2026, prosecutors dropped the charges against three individuals who were charged in 2024. One individual was charged with being an accessory after the fact. Another was charged with possession of property obtained by crime. A third individual, a jewelry store owner, was also charged with possession of property obtained by crime.

Archit Grover was the owner of the getaway truck and the employer of Durante King-McLean, who allegedly drove that truck. Police described Archit Grover as a "longtime friend" of Parmpal Sidhu, who worked at Air Canada Cargo at the time of the heist. Prasath Paramalingam and allegedly helped Durante King-McLean cross the border into the United States after the heist.

In a March 2026 court session, an agreed statement of facts documented some of the events after the gold was stolen. At the time of the heist, Arsalan Chaudhary stationed himself in Mississauga about 5 kilometres (3.1 mi) away from the Air Canada Cargo warehouse. After the heist, he travelled to a drop-off point where he met Durante King-McLean, the driver, and took possession of some of the gold. On that day, Chaudhary made phone calls to other members of the gang, including 16 calls to the driver. Chaudhary wanted to melt down all the gold to make it saleable, which would be done in the basement of a Mississauga jewelry store. Chaudhary confessed that he helped King-McLean evade authorities, including booking an Airbnb in the US. (Chaudhary booked the Airbnb in his brother's name, which cast suspicion on his brother.) After the heist, police raided Chaudhary's home in Mississauga and found $154,000 in foreign currency and a "debt list" showing how the stolen property would be divided among gang members.

Testifying at the trial of Parmpal Sidhu, Chaudhary said he planned the heist with Simran Preet Panesar. Chaudhary took 30 per cent of the gold, melted some of it down, and sold it for cash. He then fled to Pakistan where he was kidnapped by people wearing police uniforms. To gain his release, Chaudhary had to hand over his share of the stolen gold and some cash.

The prosecution alleged that Parmpal Sidhu printed the fraudulent air waybill using his own profile the day before King-McLean used it to pick up the gold at Air Canada Cargo. The prosecution also alleged that Sidhu was one of the inside men on the heist. However, Chaudhary claimed at Sidhu's trial that he did not know Sidhu well, calling or texting him when he could not get a hold of Panesar.

== Lawsuits ==
The Greater Toronto Airport Authority said that they leased the land on which the Air Canada facility was located and that this facility was located outside of the airport's primary security line. Following the theft, Brink's contacted Air Canada on April 27, 2023, to demand full reimbursement of the costs it sustained during the heist, but no response was received. The Miami-based company is seeking legal action at the Canadian federal court, and in addition to the full reimbursement of the costs it sustained, it is also demanding an unspecified amount in special damages and legal fees. On October 11, 2023, Brink's filed a CAD $20 million lawsuit against Air Canada for the negligent handling and care of the items which it was commissioned by Raiffeisenbank and Valcambi to manage. The lawsuit alleges that there were "no security protocols in place" at the Air Canada holding facility at the time of the theft and that on April 17, 2023, at 6:32 PM Eastern Standard Time, an unidentified individual was able to gain access to this Air Canada holding facility by using a fake document and handing it to Air Canada personnel who were working at the facility during the heist. Brink's alleges that "without verifying the authenticity of this document in any way, and upon receipt of the fraudulent waybill, AC (referring to Air Canada) personnel released the shipments to the unidentified individual, following which the individual absconded with the cargo." They allege that Air Canada "failed to follow through with appropriate security measures, despite charging higher shipping rates for its 'secure service'. The airline neglected to provide storage facilities equipped with effective vaults and cages, constant CCTV surveillance, and active human surveillance personnel."

Air Canada replied that it bore no responsibility for the theft and rejected all of Brink's allegations. Air Canada noted that Brink's failed to state the shipment's value on the waybill and pay a special fee for a "special declaration of interest in delivery"; thus, Air Canada’s liability is capped by the Montreal Convention. Brink's retorted that it paid a premium for the shipment and that the waybill was marked with the words "banknotes", "gold bars", and "Special supervision is requested. Valuable cargo". Brink's thought that the Montreal Convention imposes no limit on what it can claim from the carrier. In April 2024, Peel Regional Police announced that two Air Canada employees were allegedly involved in the heist and that the fake document used in the heist was printed on an Air Canada printer.

In January 2026, the Federal Court ruled in Air Canada's favour and that Air Canada was only responsible for reimbursement of 9,988 special drawing rights, or around CAD 18,000, for the loss of the gold, the maximum prescribed under the Montreal Convention. The court sided with Air Canada's argument that Brink's did not satisfy the condition of meriting higher compensation. Because Brink's failed to enter the shipment value on the waybill, Air Canada's liability was only $40 per kilogram, roughly the same compensation as for lost passenger baggage. Brink's appealed the ruling. By August 2026, Air Canada and Brink's came to an agreement which terminated the appeal. The amount of the settlement was not publicly disclosed.

== See also ==
- Ken Leishman, mastermind behind the heist at Toronto Pearson International Airport
- Lufthansa heist, which occurred at New York's John F. Kennedy International Airport
