= Critical Air Medicine =

Airline of the United States

- Founded: 1984
- Fleet size: 2
- Destinations: charter air ambulance service
- Headquarters: San Diego, California
- Website: https://www.criticalair.com/

Critical Air Medicine is a charter air ambulance service operating from San Diego, California. Critical Air, Inc, the Texas-based rotor-wing operations division of Critical Air Medicine was sold to Air Evac Lifeteam.

The remaining fleet consists of 2 CE-421C Golden Eagle prop aircraft operated by 3 full-time pilots.

== Incidents ==
A Critical Air Medicine aircraft crashed on February 10, 1994, killing two people after 60 gallons of jet fuel was added by Nayak Aviation of San Antonio instead of the required aviation fuel.

In 1996, the airline was sued for medical malpractice by a patient's family after being airlifted to a hospital following an automobile accident.
