= Airlift Northwest =

Air ambulance service

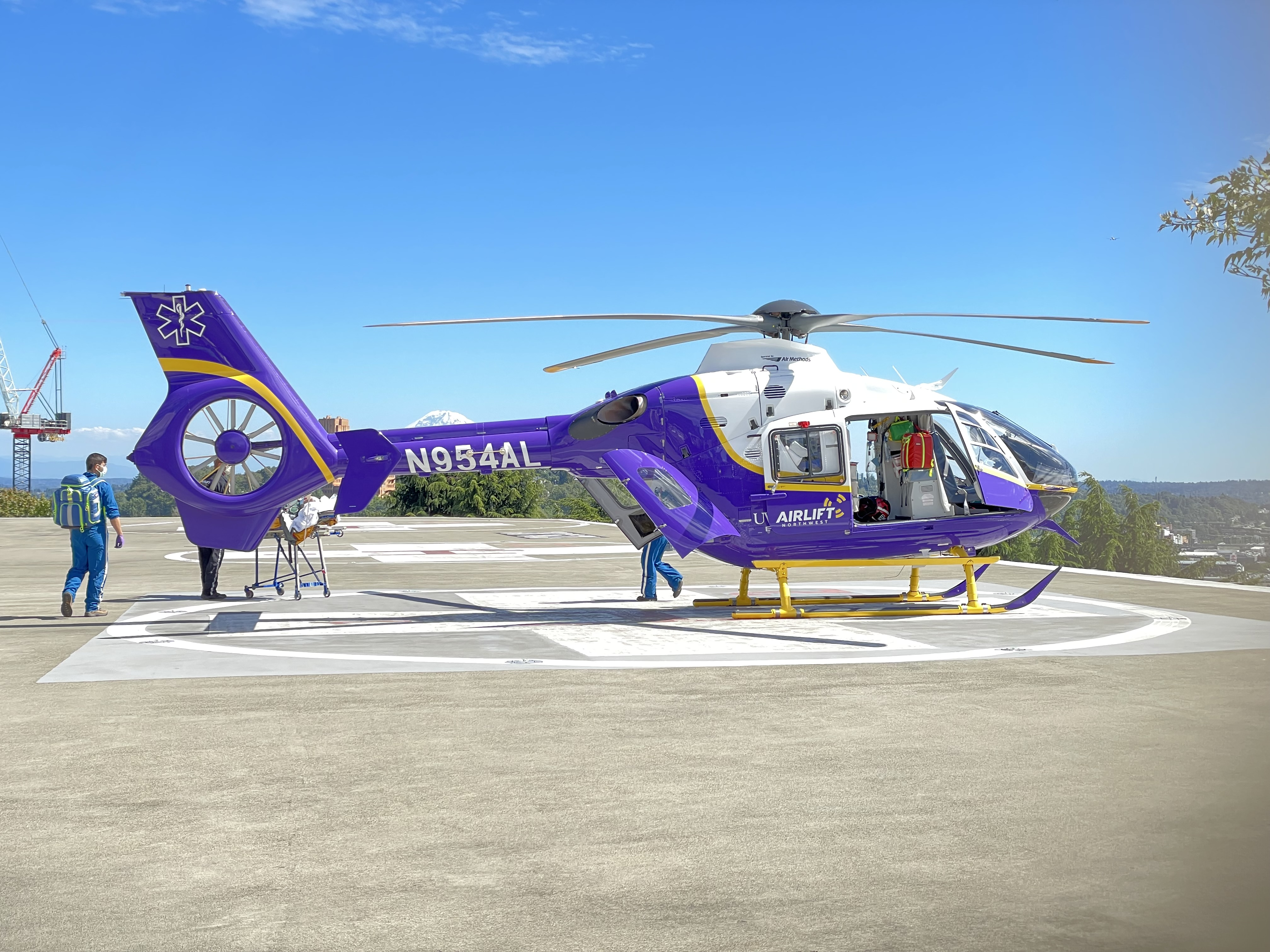
- Airlift Northwest helicopter landed on helipad at Harborview Medical Center
- Formation: 1982
- Legal status: Not-for-profit organization
- Purpose: Air medical services
- Headquarters: Seattle, Washington, United States
- Region served: Alaska and Washington
- Executive Director: Jeff Richey
- Medical Director: Richard Utarnachitt, MD
- Parent organization: UW Medicine
- Website: uwmedicine.org/airliftnw

Airlift Northwest, a program of the University of Washington School of Medicine and Harborview Medical Center, provides flight transport via helicopter and fixed wing aircraft for patients needing intensive medical care in Washington, Idaho, Montana, and Alaska.

== History ==
Airlift Northwest was founded in 1982 after three children perished following a Sitka, Alaska, house fire because there was no way to rapidly transport them to a facility capable of treating their injuries. The University of Washington's Dr. Michael Copass was the driving force behind the service which started with one Seattle-based fixed wing aircraft and a medical crew of one physician and one nurse. It was the first critical care air ambulance service in the region.

Since 1982, Airlift Northwest has had five incidents:

- One of the organization's helicopters crashed into Puget Sound on September 11, 1995, while en route to Bainbridge Island to pick up a woman in labor. Two nurses and one pilot were killed in the incident.
- The pilot and sole occupant of an Airlift Northwest helicopter sustained serious injuries in a crash near Granite Falls in 2002.
- In 2005, another Airlift Northwest helicopter crashed into the waters off of Edmonds on the evening of September 28; all occupants (a pilot and two nurses) were killed.
- On October 28, 2005, an Airlift Northwest helicopter crashed during takeoff from the rooftop helipad of Providence St. Peter Hospital in Olympia, Washington. One flight nurse received minor injuries.
- On September 23, 2025, a Eurocopter EC135 T2+ (registration N955AL) operating as an Airlift Northwest air medical flight crashed onto its right side during landing near Little Kachess Lake, Washington. According to the NTSB preliminary report, the crew encountered reduced visibility due to dust during the approach, and the helicopter impacted a gravel mound before overturning. The helicopter was substantially damaged, and the pilot and three medical crew members sustained minor injuries. The accident is under investigation by the National Transportation Safety Board (WPR25LA290)

Airlift Northwest crews played key roles in the response to the 2014 Oso mudslide, transporting 5 injured survivors to area hospitals.

== Operations ==
Locations of Airlift Northwest rotary wing and fixed wing bases in Washington

Airlift Northwest operates 24 hours a day, 365 days a year and flies approximately 4,000 patients annually. The not-for-profit agency is entirely self-funded with a $40 million annual budget. Airlift Northwest estimates that it provides about $7.5 million in uncompensated charity care every year.

=== Base locations ===
- Arlington, WA
- Bellingham, WA
- Bremerton, WA
- Davenport, WA
- Juneau, AK
- Olympia, WA
- Wenatchee, WA
- Yakima, WA

=== Fleet ===
As of March 2023, Airlift Northwest consists of the following fleet operated by Air Methods Corp. and Aero Air, LLC.

==== Rotor wing aircraft ====
- 1 Agusta A109E Power
- 5 Airbus H135

==== Fixed wing aircraft ====
- 3 Pilatus PC-12
- 2 Learjet45 XR

== Crew ==
Airlift Northwest's pilots and aircraft are supplied trained and maintained by two outside contractors: Air Methods Corporation and Aero Air. Approximately 70 medical personnel, employees of the University of Washington, provide care aboard flights. Medical crews are trained in Advanced Cardiac Life Support, Pediatric Advanced Life Support, trauma nursing core course, neonatal resuscitation and Emergency Medical Technician.
