= Washington Medal of Merit =

- Type: Medal
- Awarded for: "exceptionally meritorious conduct in performing outstanding services to the people and state of Washington"
- Presented by: Governor of Washington
- Eligibility: All persons, living or deceased, except elected officials while in office or candidates for an elected office.
- Status: Active
- Established: 1986
- First award: 1987

Highlights
- Total: 34
- Total awarded posthumously: 2

Precedence
- Next (lower): Washington Medal of Valor

The Washington Medal of Merit is one of three statutory civilian decorations issued by the state of Washington, the others being the Washington Medal of Valor and the Washington Gift of Life Award (formerly the Washington Gift of Life Medal). Washington law does not describe an order of precedence for state decorations, though the Medal of Merit is generally considered the state's highest honor.

== Medal ==
=== Qualifications ===
All persons, living or dead, except elected officials and current political candidates, are eligible to receive the medal. The medal is bestowed by the Governor of Washington on the advice of the "medal of merit committee," which is composed of the governor himself, as well as the chief justice of the Washington State Supreme Court, the speaker of the Washington State House of Representatives, and the president of the Washington State Senate. The Washington Secretary of State serves as the committee's secretary. The process for nomination is not set by law, but, under current rules adopted by the committee, any person may nominate a qualified candidate through submission of a letter of nomination to the secretary of state who periodically presents received nominations to the committee for consideration.

While there are no residency requirements for the Medal of Merit, all recipients to-date were either born in Washington or lived there at the time of their decoration.

=== Design and presentation ===
The Medal of Merit is made from solid bronze. In addition to the recipient's name, the reverse reads "For exceptionally meritorious conduct in performing outstanding services to the people and state of Washington." By custom, the medal is awarded by the Governor to a slate of recipients during a joint session of the Washington State Senate and Washington State House of Representatives convened for that purpose. The authorizing legislation does not specify a frequency for issuing the medal, therefore, it has generally been awarded with irregularity.

== Background ==
=== History ===
The Washington Medal of Merit was established by an act of the Washington Legislature in 1986 with the first medals presented after the reconvening of the legislature the following year. The medal's past recipients have included three nobel laureates.

=== Recipients ===
1987

- Warren G. Magnuson – United States Senator
- Dorothy Bullitt – owner of KING-TV
- Orville Vogel – agricultural scientist
- Lester R. Sauvage – founder of the Hope Heart Institute

1988

- Edward Carlson – chairman of United Airlines
- William B. Hutchinson – founder of Fred Hutchinson Cancer Research Center
- Henry M. Jackson – United States Senator

1989

- Julia Butler Hansen – member of the U.S. House of Representatives
- Belding Hibbard Scribner – founder of Northwest Kidney Centers
- Charles Odegaard – president of the University of Washington

1990

- James Reed Ellis – leader of Forward Thrust
- Francis Penrose Owens – regent of Washington State University

1995

- Kathleen Ross - founder of Heritage University
- Michael Copass – director of emergency medicine at Harborview Medical Center

1998

- Grady Auvil - orchardist
- E. Donnall Thomas – recipient of the Nobel Prize in Physiology or Medicine
- Stanley O. McNaughton – president of PEMCO Insurance
- Jacob Lawrence – artist

2003

- Tom Foley – Speaker of the U.S. House of Representatives
- Leland H. Hartwell - recipient of the Nobel Prize in Physiology or Medicine
- Helmut "Brownie" Braunsteiner – veterans' advocate
- Ernest K. Gann – author

2007

- Linda B. Buck - recipient of the Nobel Prize in Physiology or Medicine
- Dale Chihuly - glass artist
- Bonnie J. Dunbar - astronaut
- Daniel J. Evans - Governor of Washington

2009

- William H. Gates, Sr. - chairman of the Bill and Melinda Gates Foundation
- Wilfred Woods - publisher of Wenatchee World
- Emma Smith DeVoe+ - "Mother of Women's Suffrage"
- May Arkwright+ - founder of the Washington Political Equality League

2015

- Billy Frank, Jr.+ - environmentalist
- Gretchen Shodde - activist

+ awarded posthumously

== See also ==
- Awards and Decorations of the Washington National Guard
- Washington Law Enforcement Medal of Honor
