= Metro Life Flight =

Air ambulance service

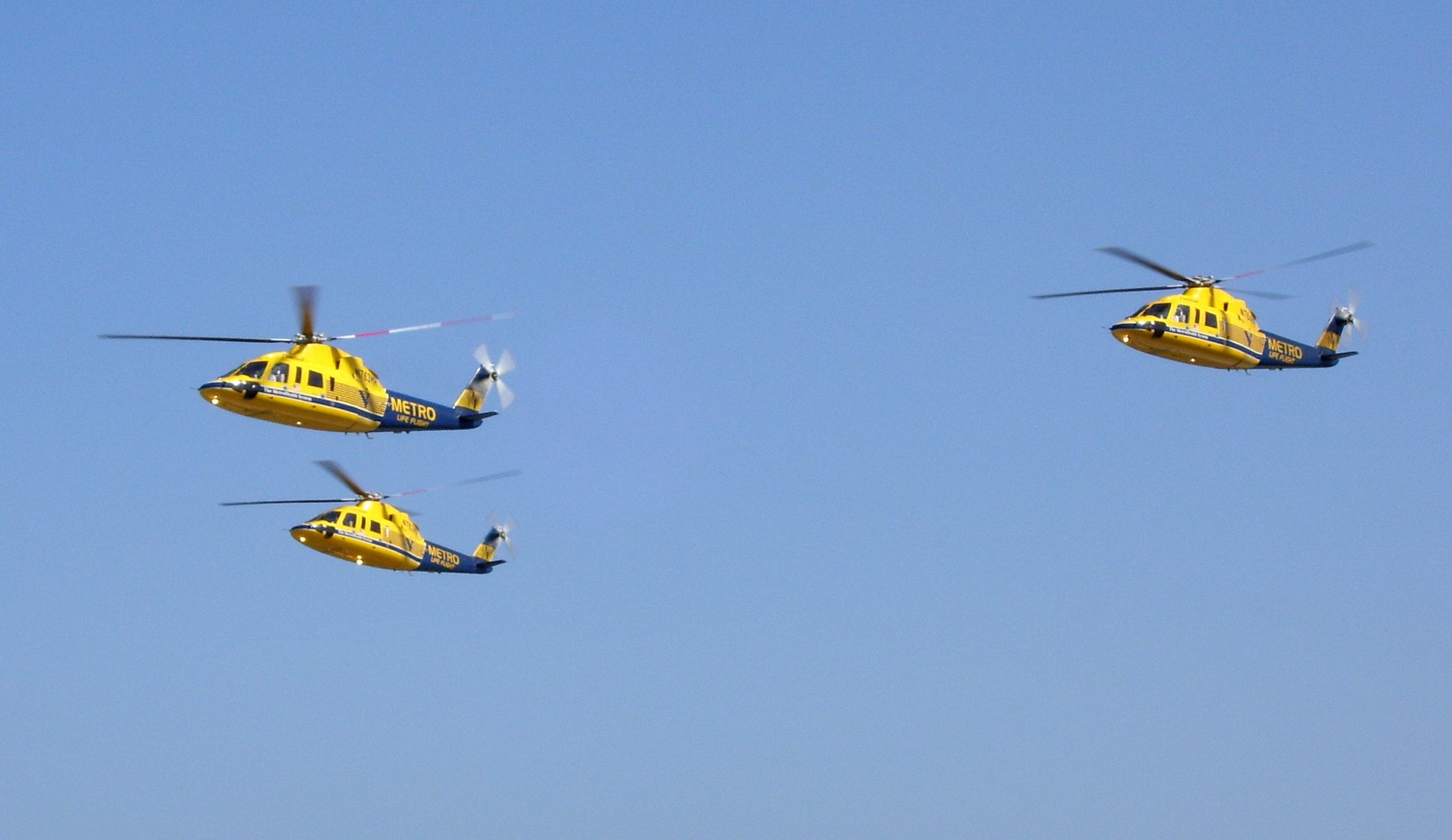
Life Flight Sikorsky S-76 Helicopters at the Cleveland Air Show

Metro Life Flight is an air ambulance service serving the Cleveland, Ohio area, and is part of the MetroHealth system. The system is fully CAMTS certified, and provides transport between local hospitals, as well as emergency transport to MetroHealth Medical Center, a Level 1 Trauma Center.

== History ==
Metro Life Flight was founded in 1982 as the first air medical program in Northeast Ohio. In 1984 the service switched to a dual pilot model. In 2009 the main operating base was moved from MetroHealth Medical Center to three bases in the surrounding area. In 2010, the old fleet of Sikorsky S-76 helicopters was replaced by 3 Eurocopter EC 145s. In 2022, Metro Life Flight took over operational control of ProMedica Air Bases in Clyde, OH and Swanton, OH. Metro Life Flight provided two new EC145 c2e's as well as providing medical and operational oversight and dispatch operations. In December of 2025, the Metro Life Flight Program including the ProMedica Air bases transitioned to a single pilot model.

== Current Bases ==
Metro Life Flight operates two aerial bases:

- Lorain County Regional Airport
- Wayne County Airport (Ohio)

Ground operations are conducted out of MetroHealth Medical Center in Cleveland, MetroHealth Parma, MetroHealth Brecksville, and MetroHealth Cleveland Heights.

== Crew ==
Each flight is staffed by an instrument rated pilot, a physician or nurse practitioner, and a registered nurse. The pilots are mostly ex-military, and are fully trained and certified for night vision goggle operations.

== Fleet ==
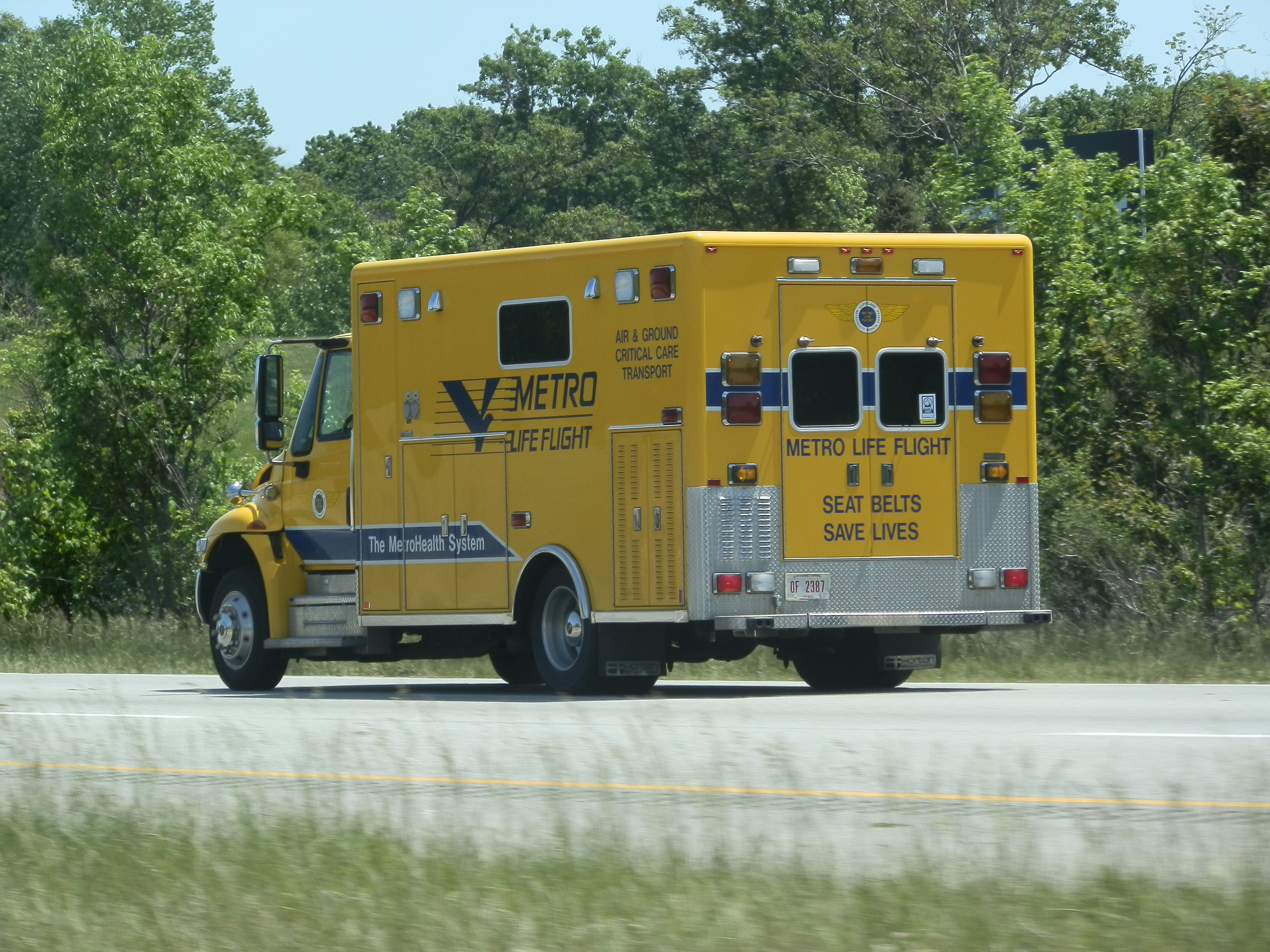
A Life Flight ground transportation ambulance in 2012

The main rotor fleet consists of three EC145 C2's and two EC145 c2e's with 4 in service. Each helicopter is capable of caring for patients with serious trauma, acute cardiac emergencies, and childbirth. There has been one incident in the service's long history with a piece of construction material pulled into the rotor system, striking the main rotor, and causing a hard landing. All ground transport vehicles are equipped with identical capabilities.
