= American Medical Response =

Ambulance company in the US

American Medical Response, Inc.
- Type: Subsidiary
- Industry: Emergency services
- Founded: 1991
- Headquarters: Greenwood Village, Colorado
- Key people: Nick Loporcaro, CEO
- Products: Ambulance services
- Number of employees: 34,000
- Parent: Global Medical Response
- Website: www.amr.net

American Medical Response, Inc. (AMR) is a private ambulance company in the United States that provides and manages emergency medical services, non-emergency and managed transportation, rotary and fixed-wing air ambulance services, and disaster response across the United States.

== History ==
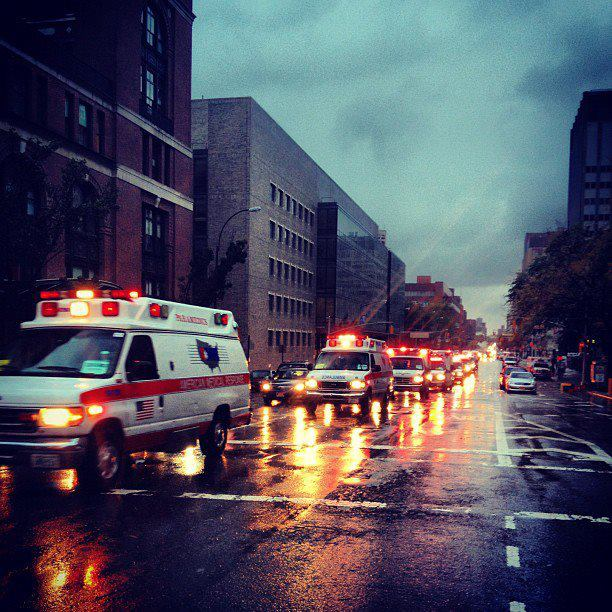
AMR responding during Hurricane Sandy in New York City

The company was founded in 1991 through the merger of Regional Ambulance (Alameda and Contra Costa counties, California), Vanguard Ambulance (Santa Clara County, California), and Buck Ambulance (Portland, Oregon). It was subsequently acquired by Laidlaw, and sold to Onex in 2004. With this acquisition, Onex formed Emergency Medical Services Corporation (EMSC) by merging AMR with EmCare. In 2011, EMSC was acquired by Clayton, Dubilier & Rice.

On June 12, 2013, EMSC changed its name to Envision Healthcare.

On August 8, 2017, Envision Healthcare announced that AMR would be sold to Kohlberg Kravis Roberts in a deal worth US$2.4 billion.

In March 2018, AMR merged with Air Medical Group Holdings under the new holding company Global Medical Response. Also in 2018, AMR was the main campaign contributor in support of California Proposition 11 (2018), a bill that modified California labor law to allow for EMS workers to be on-call during breaks.

In 2022, AMR entered in a five-year contract with FEMA to provide medical transport and support for national disasters in the United States.

== See also ==
- Emergency medical services
- Emergency medical technician
- Emergency telephone number
- Paramedic
