= Michael Copass =

American physician (1938–2024)

- Born: March 30, 1938; Seattle, Washington, U.S.
- Died: July 26, 2024 (aged 86); Gig Harbor, Washington, U.S.
- Spouse: Lucy Copass
- Children: 3

Michael Copass (March 30, 1938 – July 26, 2024) was an American physician and pioneer in emergency medicine. He had been the director of Harborview Medical Center's paramedic training program and he also served as the Seattle Fire Department Medical Director.

== Education ==
Copass studied at Queen Anne High School. He completed his bachelor's degree from Stanford University and got his master's degree from Northwestern University in 1964.

== Career ==
The Seattle Times described him in a 2000 profile as a "juggernaut in a sweater vest, a man likened to a mix of Albert Schweitzer and Gen. George Patton, with four pagers and a radio strapped to his belt."

He was among the two winners of the Washington Medal of Merit in 1995.

== Personal life and death ==
Copass met his future wife, Lucy Ames, while studying at Stanford. They had three children: Cloantha and Michael III, and the youngest one was Catharine.

Michael Copass died at a skilled nursing facility in Gig Harbor, on July 26, 2024, at the age of 86.
