= Emergency Aviation in the United Kingdom =

Emergency Aviation in the United Kingdom may refer to:

- Air ambulances in the United Kingdom
- Police air support units; see Police aviation in the United Kingdom
- Search and rescue facilities provided by the Royal Air Force, the Royal Navy, or HM Coastguard
