= Mercy Flights =

Air medical transport service

Mercy Flights is a ground ambulance and air medical transport service based in Medford, Oregon, United States.

Mercy Flights was founded as a non-profit organization in 1949 by George Milligan, an air traffic controller in Medford, after a friend of his died of polio in Southern Oregon, unable to survive the long, slow ground transport to Portland. William Edward Brooks, who later moved to Alaska, also claims to have founded the organization.

Through fundraising efforts by schoolchildren, scouts, and others in the community, George Milligan raised enough money to buy the first aircraft, a twin engine Cessna, which was known as the bamboo bomber. The "Museum of Flight" in Seattle, Washington has Mercy Flights Retired plane "Iron Annie" on display, the Beech C-45H Expeditor was used on over 1100 missions in remote areas of Oregon, Washington and California.

A membership program was established which provided people in the community an opportunity to contribute to Mercy Flights, while ensuring that they would be financially covered in the event that they needed air medical transportation. To date, Mercy Flights has flown more than 15,000 patients throughout the western United States. Mercy Flights' ground ambulance service currently serves more than 25,000 patients each year. Mercy Flights currently has two King Air C-90s, which are pressurized up to 25,000 feet.

In 1992, Mercy Flights purchased Medford Ambulance Service, expanding operations to include ground ambulance transportation in an effort to build a regional medical transportation network. In 1993, Mercy Flights acquired Rogue Ambulance, expanding its service area to include the communities of White City, Eagle Point, and Shady Cove.

In the past, the outlying communities of Prospect and Butte Falls were served by all volunteer ambulance services, which were struggling with the financial difficulties of operating ambulances in the nineties. Through a cooperative effort, these first responders and Emergency Medical Technicians (EMTs) continue to serve their communities, but now do so as a valuable part of the Mercy Flights organization. These communities benefit from the assurance of consistent, professional emergency medical services and a stronger economic base, and the EMTs benefit through increased training, improved equipment, and some financial compensation for the crucial role they play.

In 1995, Mercy Flights and Timberland entered a joint effort to provide an emergency helicopter service available to all citizens and agencies within a 150-mile radius of Medford, further expanding the type of medical transportation provided. This added resource allows rapid transport for critical patients, as well as improved access to remote areas.

In 2015 Mercy Flights purchased a newly manufactured Bell 407 helicopter. In 2022 Mercy Flights purchased a second newly manufactured Bell 407. Mercy Flights currently operates two Bell 407 helicopters which allow it to conduct scene calls and interfacility transfers.

Mercy Flights sponsors an EMS specific Explorer post through the Learning for Life program of the Boy Scouts of America. Through this program, young people between the ages of 16 and 21 receive training and experience in EMS and are able to "explore" this as a career option. The young explorers are medically trained at a First Responder level and are used at large public events, scouting events, and disaster relief efforts such as the flooding problems experienced by Jackson County in January 1997.

In February 2023, Mercy Flights received a grant worth more than $260,000 from the Oregon Higher Education Coordinating Commission to create an emergency medical services apprenticeship program.

== See also ==
- Flight Paramedic
- Emergency medical responder levels by state
- MEDEVAC
- Emergency medical service
- Air Ambulances in the United States
- Safety of emergency medical services flights
- Commission on Accreditation of Medical Transport Systems
