= EastCare =

Ambulance service in North Carolina, US

ECU Health EastCare
- Type: Private
- Genre: Critical Care Transport
- Predecessor: EastCare
- Founded: Greenville, North Carolina (April 8, 1985)
- Founder: Pitt County Memorial Hospital
- Headquarters: ECU Health Medical Center, Greenville, North Carolina, Greenville, North Carolina, United States
- Area served: Eastern North Carolina; Southeastern Virginia
- Key people: Trey Labrecque, (Program Director, ECU Health EastCare); Joanna Adams, MD, (Medical Director, ECU Health EastCare)
- Services: Air & Ground Critical Care Medical Transport
- Owner: ECU Health; ECU Health Medical Center
- Number of employees: 125
- Website: www.ecuhealth.org/services/emergency-trauma/eastcare/

ECU Health EastCare is the critical care mobile air and ground transport service of ECU Health at ECU Health Medical Center. It serves 31 counties in Eastern North Carolina. It is sponsored by ECU Health Medical Center and The Brody School of Medicine at East Carolina University. ECU Medical Center is the only level 1 trauma center east of Raleigh. EastCare's six full-time air ambulances constitute the largest air medical program in North Carolina and can serve a radius of 230 nautical miles (430 km; 260 mi) around Greenville without refueling.

Joanna Adams is the current medical director for ECU Health EastCare and Trey Labrecque is the Program Director.

ECU Health EastCare can be dispatched for a number of causes, including: trauma, burn, neonatal, high-risk pregnancy, hyperbaric medicine, stroke, and myocardial infarction. ECU Health EastCare is most often sent for cardiac patients, followed by trauma, pediatric, and neonatal patients. EastCare claims an excellent safety record. Its only major aviation mishap occurred on January 8, 1987.

In January 2012, Vidant Medical Transport changed its name from EastCare as part of a system-wide renaming initiative. In October 2014, Vidant Medical Transport became Vidant EastCare. In May 2022, Vidant EastCare became ECU Health EastCare.

== History ==
On December 18, 1984, the PCMH Board of Trustees budgeted $754,119 to set up a helicopter ambulance service. EastCare was established by PCMH on April 8, 1985. On June 30, 1985, an open house was held to usher in the new ambulance service.

Original flight crew
Pilots	Flight Nurses		
Willie Dykes	Mike McGinnis (Chief Flight Nurse)	Dolly Bryan	Breda Hurdle
Sam Ewing	Mary Jo Bankhead	Pam Demaree	John Nelson
Perry Reynolds	Alena Bramble	Betty Harris	Cindy Raisor

EastCare helped ECU Health Medical Center become a level 1 trauma center in November 1985. It expanded to critical care ground transport in August 1994. By 2000, ECU Health Medical Center added a second helicopter to their fleet. Additionally, ECU Health Medical Center began the construction of a new emergency department. The four-story emergency department, which includes a two-helicopter rooftop landing pad, was completed in November 2003. In 2009, the ground ambulances went on more than 10,000 trips.

=== Hurricane Floyd ===
On September 16, 1999, Hurricane Floyd made landfall in North Carolina. The Tar River, which runs through Greenville, suffered the worst flooding, exceeding 500-year flood levels along its lower stretches; it crested 24 feet (7.3 m) above flood stage. Damages in Pitt County alone were estimated at $1.6 billion (1999 USD, $1.87 billion 2006 USD).

ECU Health Medical Center turned into a landing zone for helicopters landing and departing. At the time, VMC owned one helicopter. EastCare flew 102 missions from landfall to ten days later. The first mission occurred on the afternoon of landfall when EastCare transported a woman who had been rescued from her rooftop in Pinetops and was nearing labor. The situation far exceeded VMC's aerial capability. Mission St. Joseph's Health System in Asheville sent one helicopter for two days, STAT MedEvac sent one helicopter and two teams for six days, and Rocky Mountain Helicopters / Air Methods, the company that operated EastCare's helicopters at the time, sent one helicopter for two days. Many military helicopters from the North Carolina Air National Guard were used to help rescue survivors and bring them to the hospital. At the height of the aftermath, there were as many s thirty helicopter missions each day, more than ten times the normal rate. A few days after the storm hit, the staff was fatigued and was replaced. It became ECU Health EastCare's job to fly and pick up staff who worked at the hospital. ECU Health EastCare also transported patients and supplies to and from the hospital.

== Communications and dispatch ==
EastCare's dedicated communications center, callsign "E-Comm," receives, prioritizes, and directs requests for service for both ground and air units. The communications center is located on the top floor of the ECU Medical Center emergency department tower, overlooking the helipad, and is staffed 24/7/365 by specially trained emergency communicators/dispatchers. Primary communications are via 800 MHz radio utilizing the VIPER network maintained by the North Carolina Department of Public Safety.

Additionally, EastCare's aircrews receive pre-flight and enroute support from a dedicated Operational Control Center (OCC) provided by the aviation operator, Metro Aviation. Connected to the aircraft by real-time satellite voice and data communications, the OCC provides complementary flight following, aviation weather forecasting, and maintenance support during all phases of operation.

== Helicopter air ambulances ==
ECU Health EastCare maintains five aviation bases in Bertie, Nash, Craven, Wayne, and Onslow counties. Its helicopters transport patients directly from the scene of an injury or transfer patients between medical facilities. The aircraft complete approximately 3,500 transports per year, with the average one-way flight duration being 45 minutes. EastCare's total helicopter fleet consists of eight Airbus/Eurocopter EC-145 models (N624EC, N925EC, N816EC, N918EC, N523EC, N957MF, N485EC, N854EC). Individual aircraft are assigned to a primary base but may be rotated according to operational requirements. Metro Aviation, Inc., based in Shreveport, LA, is the aviation operator and FAA Part 135 certificate holder, providing pilots and maintenance technicians. Approximately 80% of EastCare's pilots are U.S. military-trained with extensive combat experience. All pilots must meet CAMTS standards, which require qualifications well above the industry average.

- EastCare Air 1 - Based at ECU Health Bertie Hospital, Windsor, NC
- EastCare Air 2 - Based at Rocky Mount-Wilson Regional Airport (KRWI)
- EastCare Air 3 - Based at CarolinaEast Medical Center, New Bern, NC
- EastCare Air 4 - Based at Mount Olive Municipal Airport (W40)
- EastCare Air 5 - Based at Albert J. Ellis Airport (KOAJ)
- EastCare Air 6 - Based at ECU Health Medical Center (NC91) and dedicated to pediatric transport.

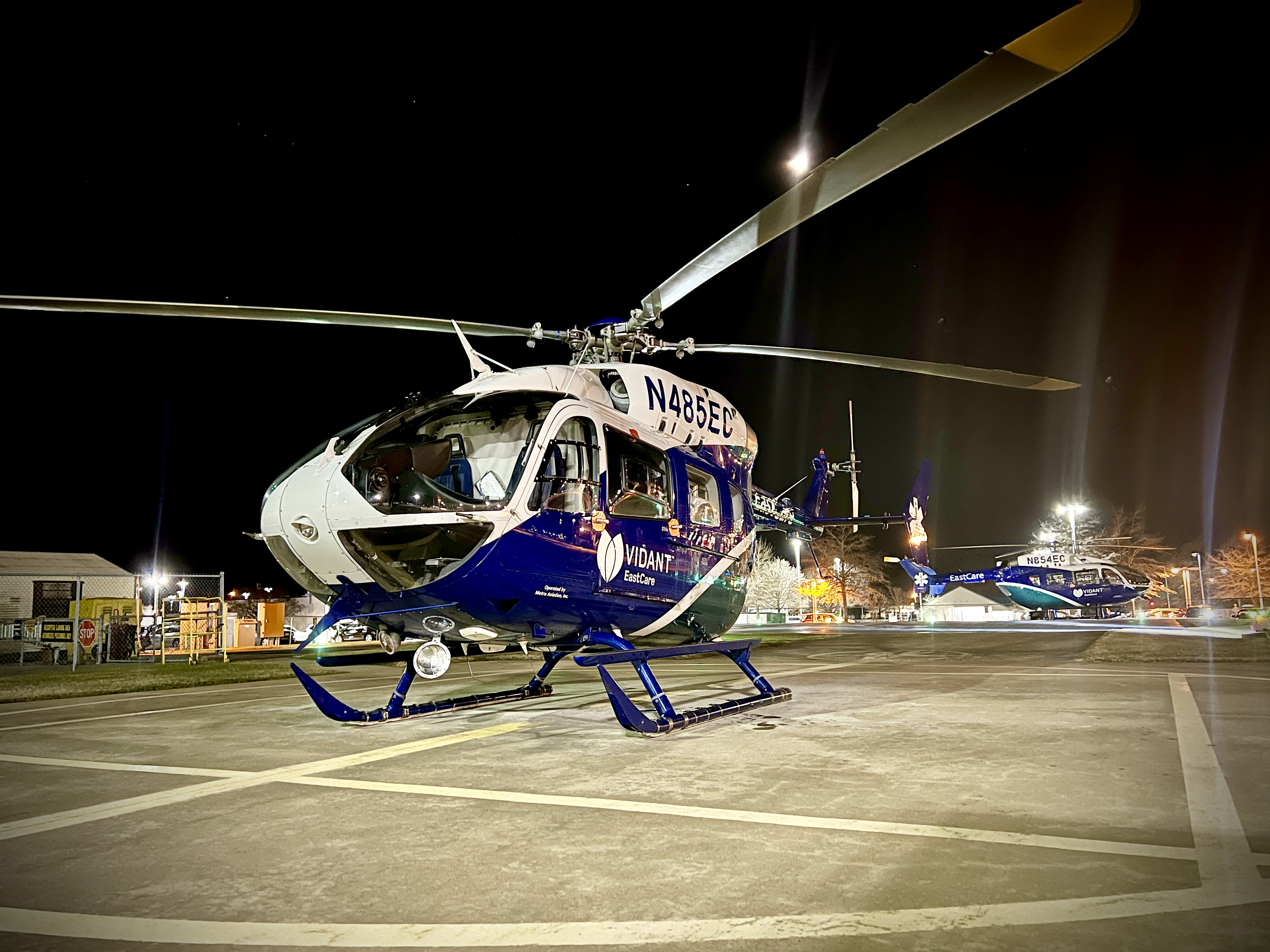
EastCare Air 1 at the ECU Lower Pad

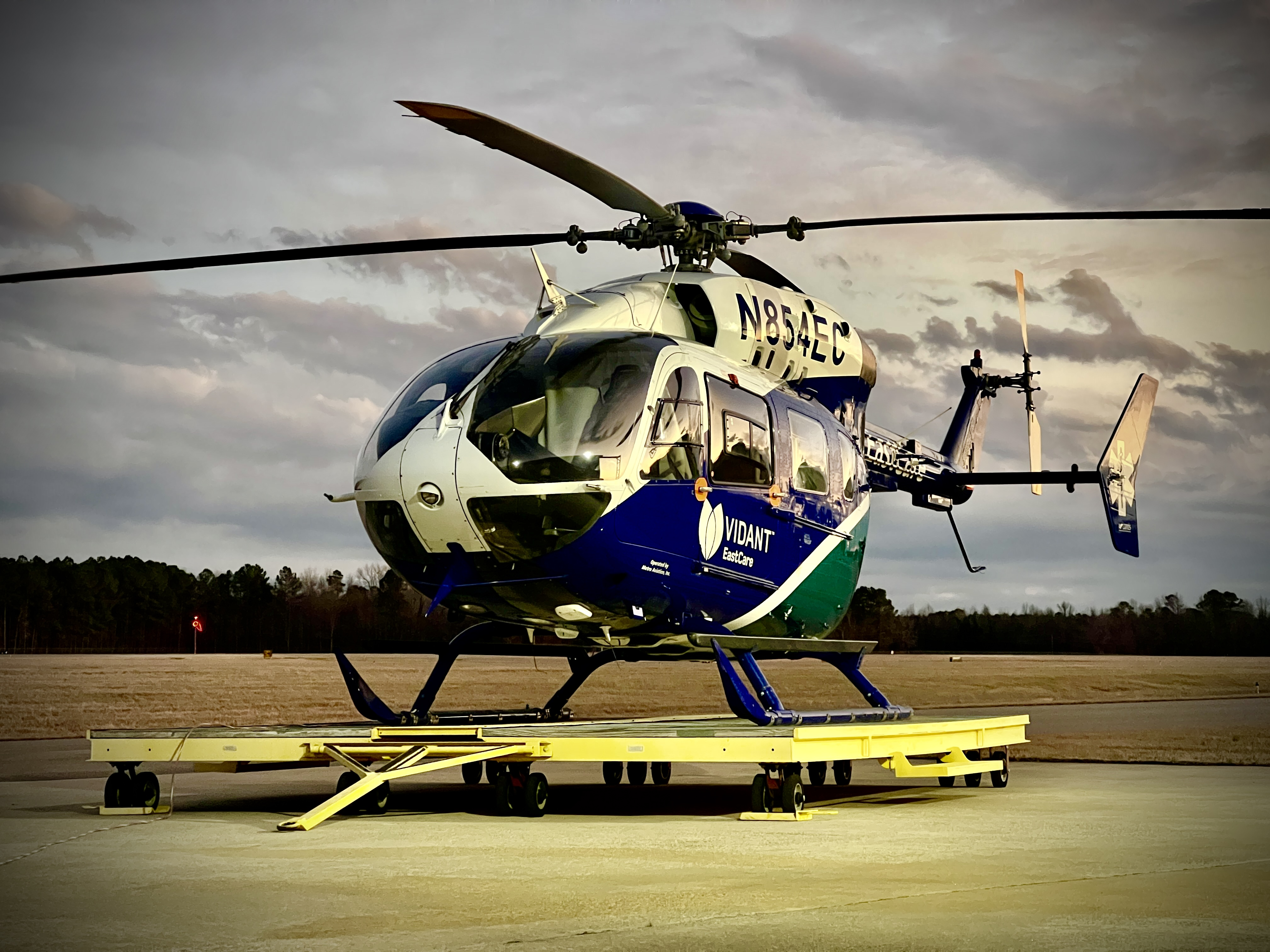
EastCare Air 2 on its dolly at KRWI

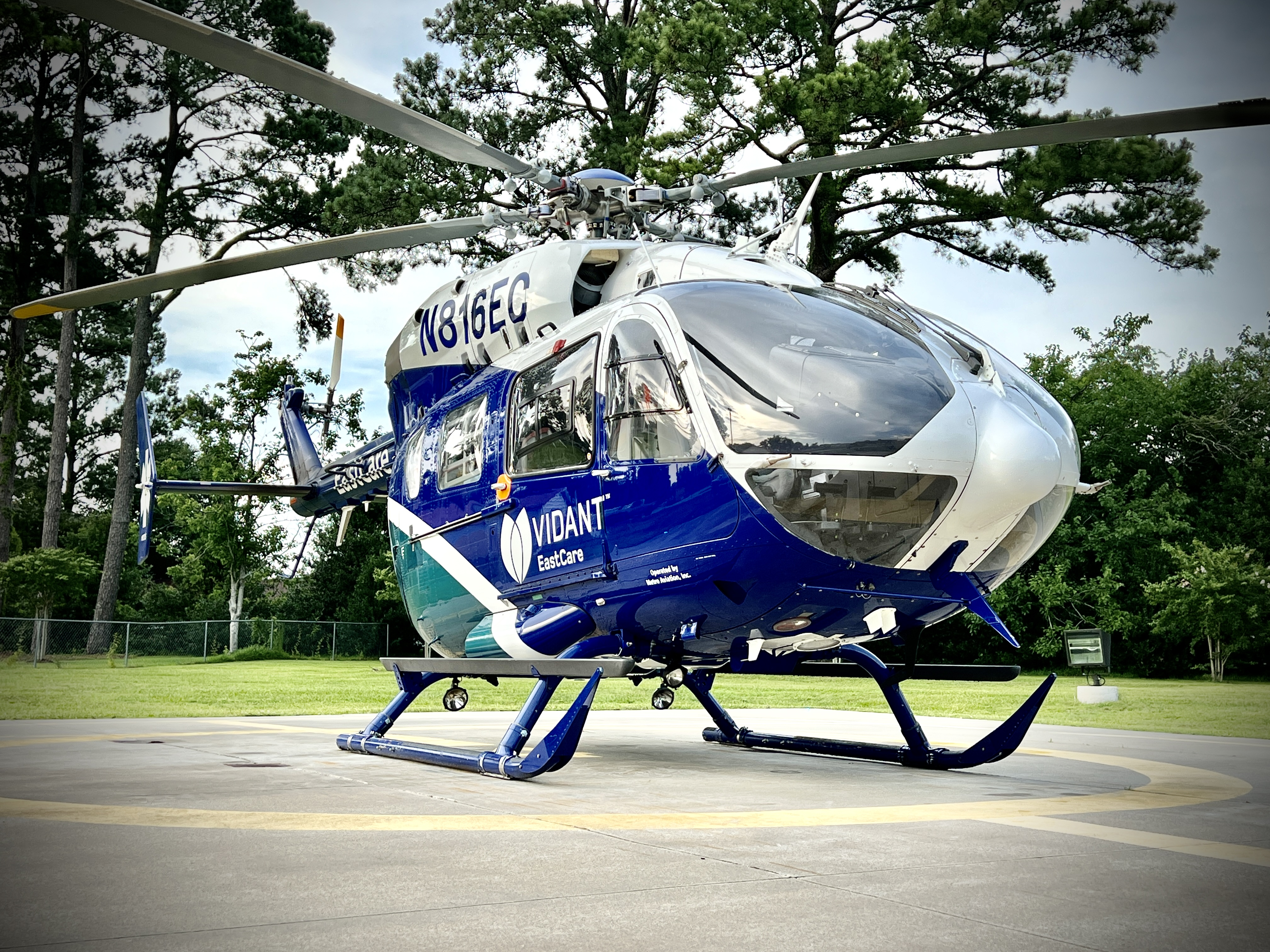
EastCare Air 3, parked at CarolinaEast Medical Center

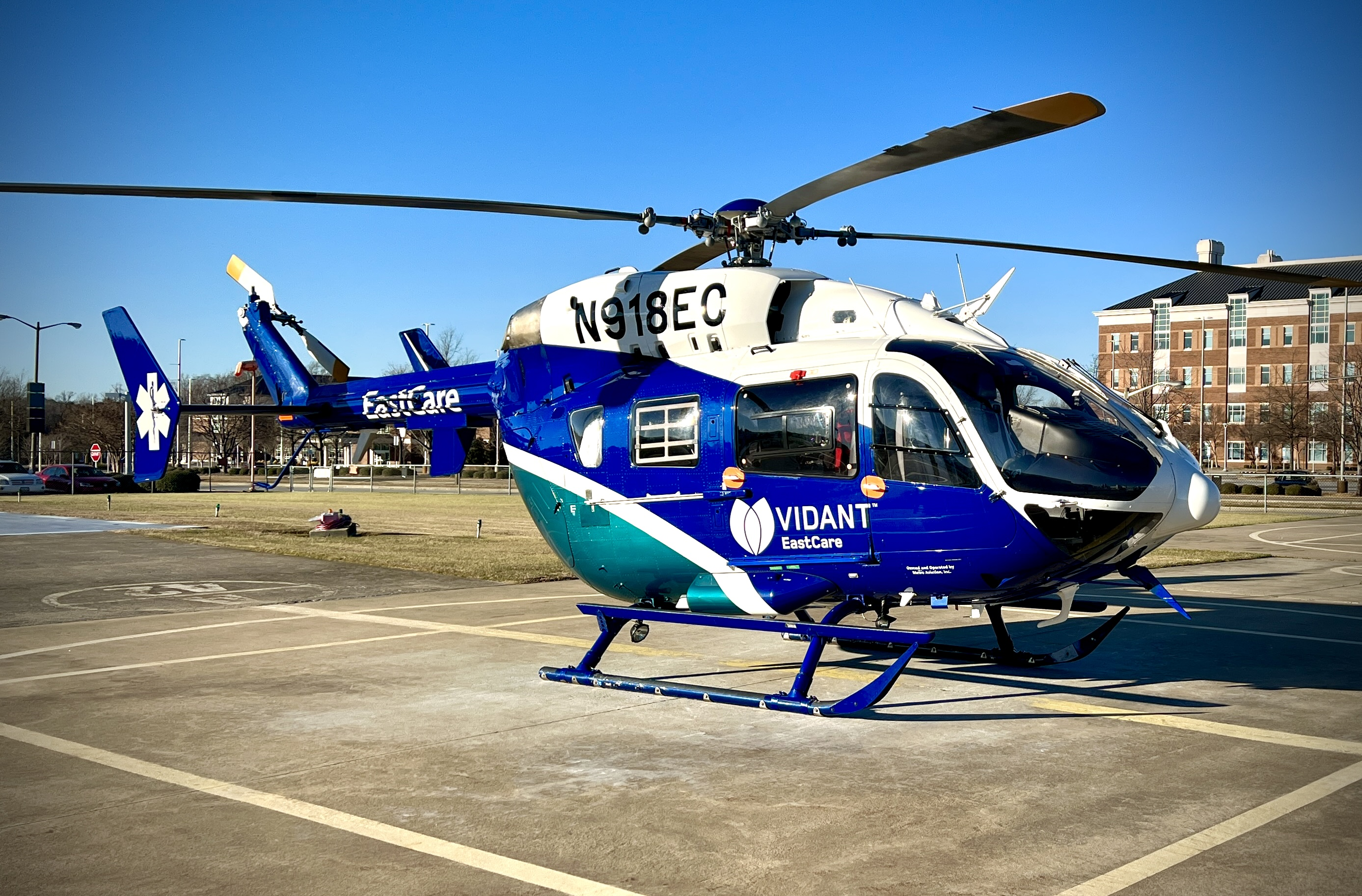
EastCare Air 4 at the ECU Medical Center Lower Pad

EastCare maintains two spare aircraft and conducts heavy maintenance from a dedicated facility at Washington-Warren Airport (KOCW) in Beaufort County.

== Ground transport ==
ECU Health EastCare began critical care ground transport in 1994. The fleet includes two neonatal transfer ambulances and ten Type I ambulances. Additionally, there are twenty-four ambulances designated for Critical Care, advanced and basic life support. The ground transport vehicles are primarily stationed in Greenville or at one of the other bases, which are located in Bertie County, Duplin County, Nash County, Craven County, Wayne County, Onslow County, and Pitt County.

== Facilities ==
In addition to an upper landing pad on the roof of the ECU Medical Center emergency department used for patient transfers, EastCare also maintains a full-service heliport on the ECU Health main campus. Located at 35°36′31″N 077°24′26″W, its FAA LID is NC91. Commonly referred to as the lower pad, the full-service aviation facility consists of a 100 x 100-foot main helipad and two smaller parking pads. On-site amenities include hot/cold refuel, maintenance, and crew rest facilities for EastCare aircraft and aircrews. EastCare helicopters typically drop off patients and medical crew at the upper pad before transitioning to the lower pad to await their next call. Both the upper and lower pads are for the exclusive use of EastCare-assigned and other authorized air medical aircraft; all other use requires prior permission. With approximately 9,000 yearly operations, the EastCare heliport is one of the busiest civil heliports in the United States.

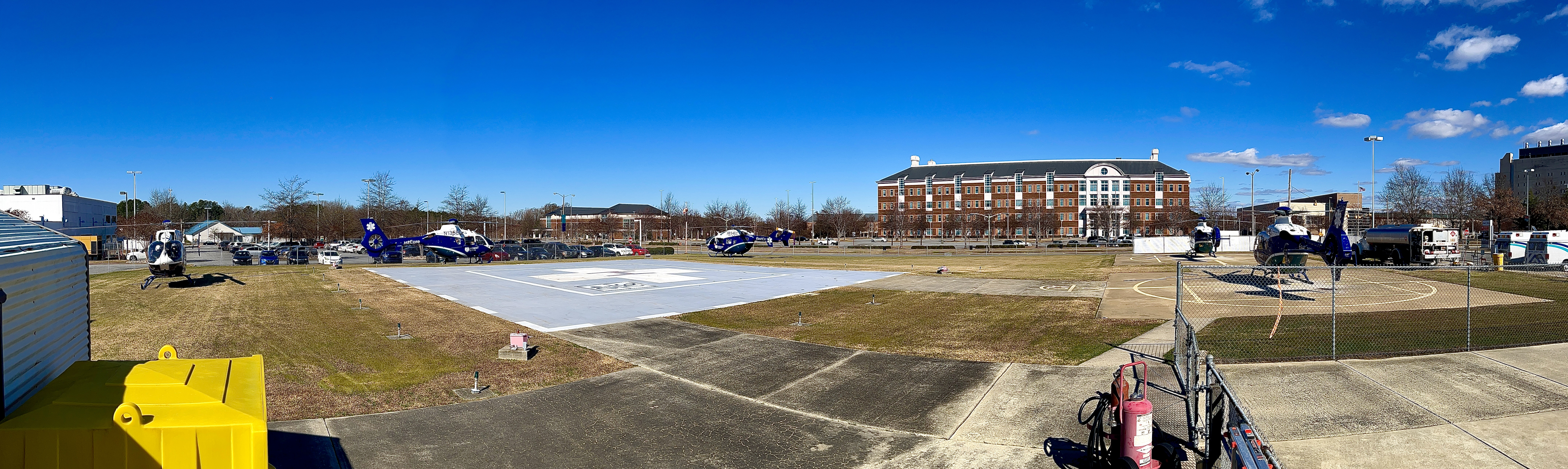
Five EastCare aircraft at ECU Medical Center.

== Awards and recognitions ==
In 1993, EastCare became the first program east of the Mississippi River and the fifth overall to be accredited by the Commission on Accreditation of Medical Transport Systems. By 1996, it was the first program to be re-accredited and the first to be accredited for critical-care ground transport. In 2000, EastCare was selected as the Program of the Year by the Association of Air Medical Services. It also received the Helicopter World/Air Ambulance Search and Rescue 2001 Award for its work during Hurricane Floyd.

In 2022, an EastCare Air crew received the MedEvac Transport of the Year Award from the Association of Air Medical Services (AAMS) for their life-saving measures following a boating accident. The team, consisting of Steve Bonn (pilot), Jessica Rispoli (flight nurse), and John vonRosenberg (flight paramedic), saved the life of a young athlete who was injured by a boat propeller after being pulled into it by a ski rope.

== Safety ==
EastCare records only a single notable aviation safety event throughout hundreds of thousands of flight hours flown.

On January 8, 1987, EastCare's Bell 206L LongRanger helicopter was dispatched to the Naval Hospital at Camp Lejeune for a pediatric transport. Following pickup of the patient, the crew reported an in-flight fire via mayday. A United States Marine Corps search and rescue team from Air Station New River was launched and discovered the downed aircraft in the Hoffman Forest, near Pollocksville, Jones County, at approximately 9:40 pm. Pilot Perry L. Reynolds, flight nurses Mike McGinnis and Pam Demaree, and the patient died in the accident.

A memorial monument at EastCare's main heliport commemorates the crew.
