= The MetroHealth System =

Coordinates: 41°27′40″N 81°41′52″W

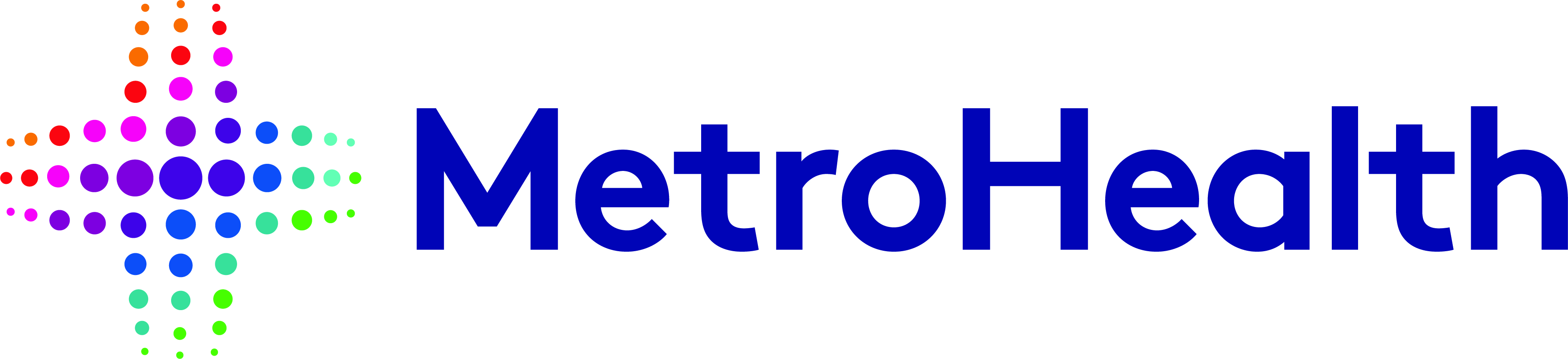

Geography
- Location: 2500 MetroHealth Drive, Cleveland, Ohio, USA (United States)

Organisation
- Care system: Public
- Type: Academic Medical Center
- Affiliated university: Case Western Reserve University School of Medicine

Services
- Emergency department: Level I adult trauma and burn center Level II pediatric trauma and burn center
- Beds: 731

Helipads
- Helipad: FAA LID: 53OI

History
- Founded: 1837

Links
- Website: metrohealth.org
- Other links: List of hospitals in the United States; List of hospitals in Ohio

The MetroHealth System is a non-profit, public health care system located in Cleveland, Ohio. Founded in 1837 as City Hospital, The MetroHealth System serves the residents of the city of Cleveland and Cuyahoga County. The MetroHealth System is a teaching hospital of Case Western Reserve University, with which it is affiliated.

The system provides care at three hospitals, more than 20 health centers and 40 additional sites throughout Cuyahoga County. As of December 2023, it had almost 9,000 employees. The system is the 10th largest employer in Northeast Ohio.

MetroHealth is a Level I Adult Trauma Center and Level II Pediatric Trauma Center. It is one of the three major health care systems in Cleveland, Ohio, along with Cleveland Clinic and University Hospitals.

In 1982, MetroHealth established its Metro Life Flight air ambulance service. Metro Life Flight has completed more than 90,000 medical missions, all safely. This air ambulance service is internationally known and has trained crews from Poland to Japan. It uses a fleet of three EC-145 helicopters for its air ambulance service.

== History ==
City Hospital was founded in 1837 when Cleveland City Council designated control and management of the Township Poor House to the new City Board of Health and renamed the building City Hospital. For more than a decade, the hospital operated in the two-story building, located at the northwest corner of Clinton Street (now East 14th Street) and Sumner Avenue. The site is now part of Erie Street Cemetery.

In 1855, the institution, then called City Infirmary, moved to its current location about 2 1/2 miles southwest of downtown on an 80-acre lot on Scranton Road in Brooklyn Township. The new five-story building was “designed to accommodate both the insane of the city and the sick and infirm poor, and furnish also facilities for clinical instruction to the physicians of the day."

In 1889, a new building, large enough to treat 200 patients, opened on the Scranton Road campus. The building offered the latest in medical science and accommodations (steam heat, feathered pillows and hair mattresses, which replaced straw bedding).

In the decades around the turn of the century, as Cleveland's population soared from 160,000 in 1880 to almost 800,000 in 1920, City Hospital saw major growth and a shift from an organization primarily serving the city's destitute to an institution providing medical care to all. It also became a robust training ground for doctors and nurses.

Milestones during this period included the formation of the hospital's first medical staff in 1891, the construction of a children's hospital in 1899 and the construction of a tuberculosis sanitorium in 1902.

In 1914 City Hospital and the medical school at Western Reserve University (now Case Western Reserve University) forged a formal affiliation, combining research with education and creating a firm basis for modern medical science.

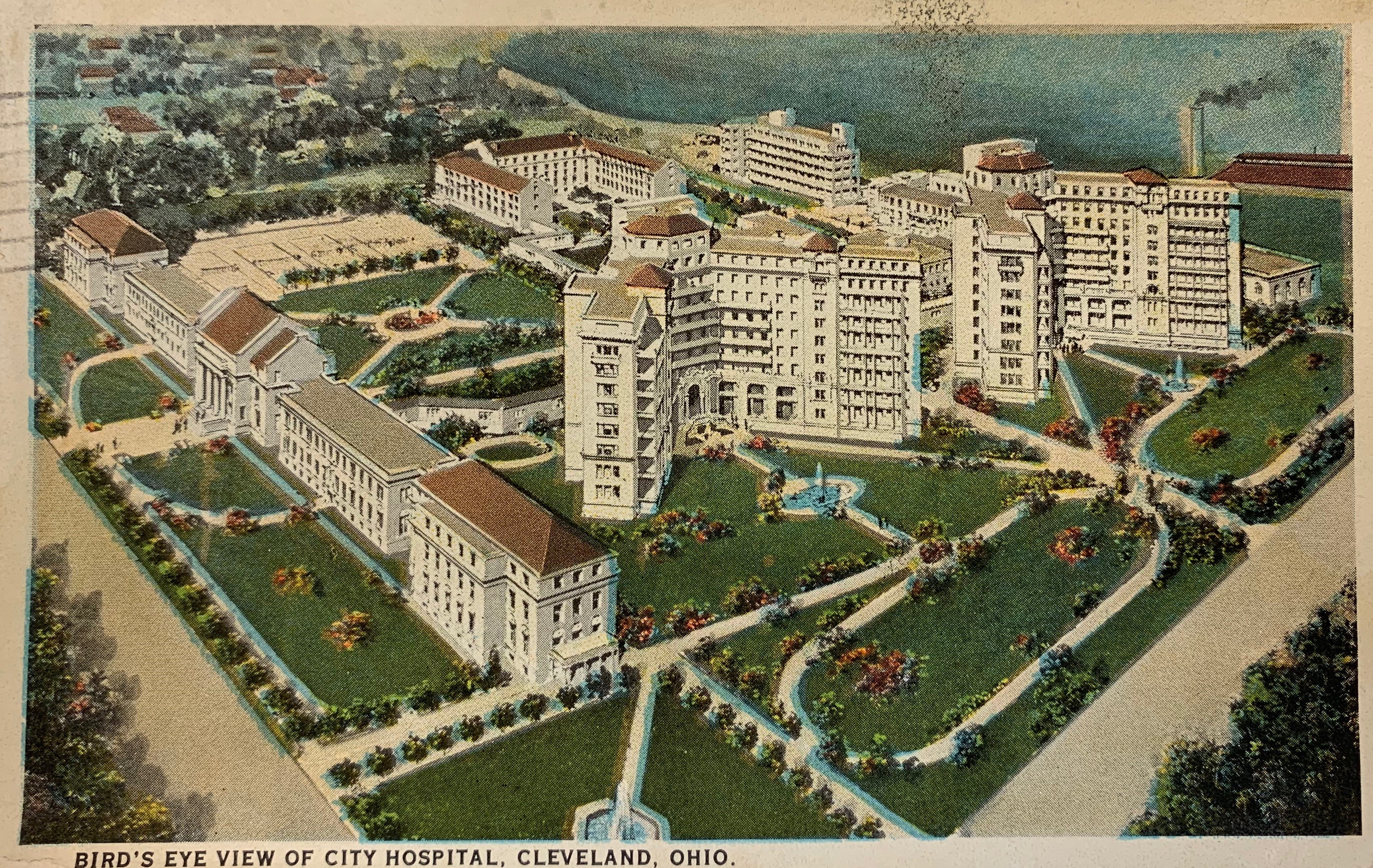
Aerial view of Cleveland's City Hospital, circa 1920.

By City Hospital's 100th anniversary in 1937, its campus on Scranton Road boasted 16 buildings and 1,650 beds, making it the country's sixth largest hospital.

In 1958, voters of Cuyahoga County approved a measure to transfer City Hospital to county control, and the Cuyahoga County Hospital System was born. It is recognized as the nation's first public hospital system. City Hospital became known as Cleveland Metropolitan General Hospital.

In 1970, the system opened its nationally renowned burn center.

In 1972, construction was completed on Cleveland Metropolitan General Hospital's 12-story twin bed towers, capping a decade-long $40 million expansion and renovation of the hospital's campus.

The Cuyahoga County Hospital System was renamed The MetroHealth System in 1989.

In May 2014, MetroHealth announced plans for a Campus Transformation project to rebuild the hospital on its main campus.

== Structure and finances ==
The MetroHealth System is governed by a board of trustees composed of 10 voluntary members approved by Cuyahoga County Council. Per Section 339 of the Ohio Revised Code, the trustees are appointed or re-appointed for a term of six years.

MetroHealth receives funding from Cuyahoga County taxpayers via a Health and Human Services levy. In 2020, the system received $32.4 million in county taxpayer support, which made up 2.2% of its total operating revenue.

== Education and research ==
MetroHealth is an academic medical center and has been affiliated with the Case Western Reserve University School of Medicine since 1914. All active staff physicians hold faculty appointments at CWRU.

The system has 47 residency and fellowship programs and trains more than 2,000 students, residents and fellows each year. Medical, clinical and epidemiological research is conducted throughout the system.

== Main Campus Transformation and the MetroHealth Glick Center ==
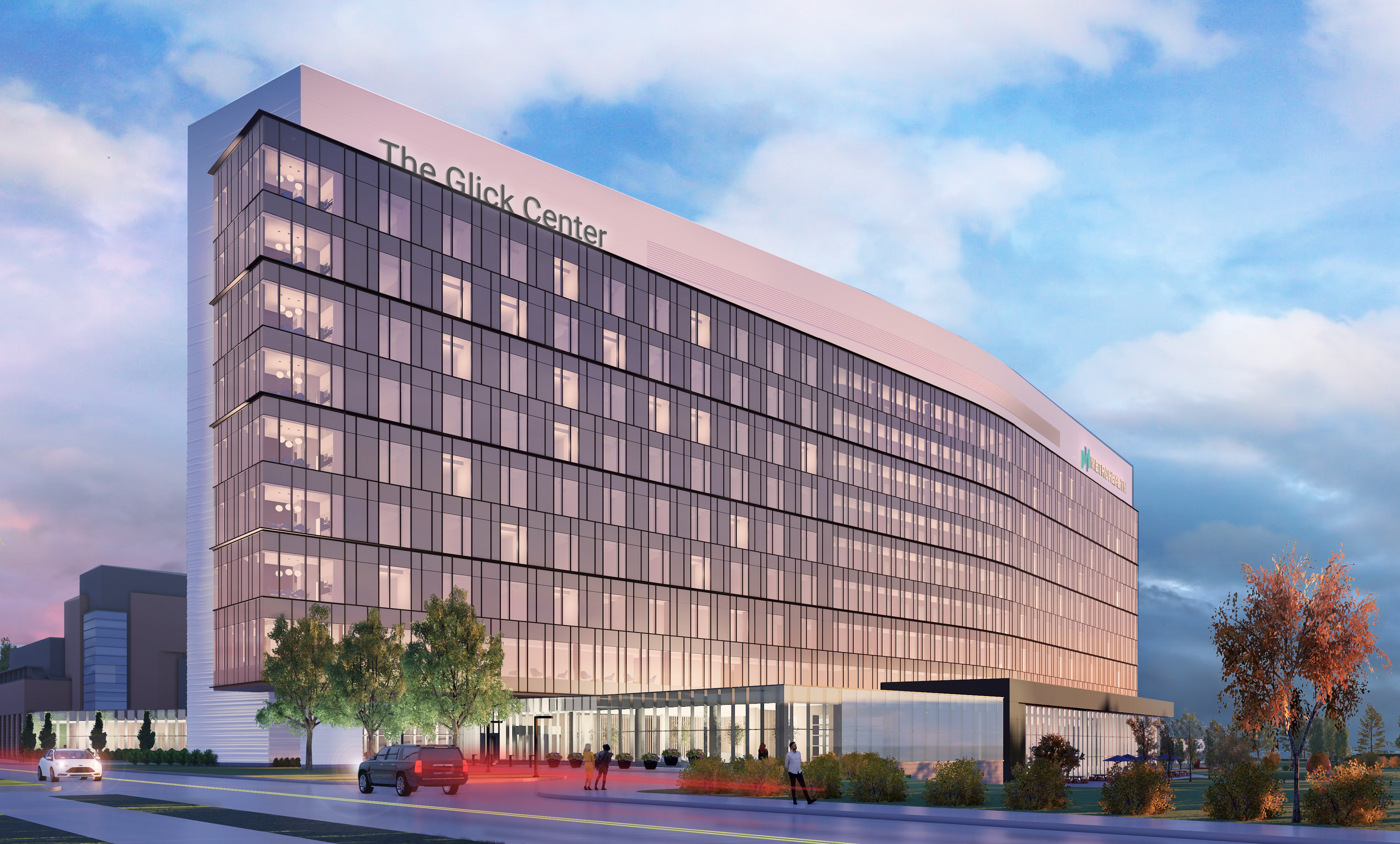
The MetroHealth Glick Center main campus hospital rendering

In 2014, the system announced plans for a Main Campus Transformation that included the construction a new hospital and the eventual demolition of the current hospital bed towers.

Financing for the project was secured in 2017 with the sale of $946 million in hospital-issued revenue bonds.

The system unveiled the design of the new hospital and reimagined main campus in 2018. The plan includes a 12-acre park and more than 25 acres of total green space on the campus.

Ground was broken on the project in April 2019.

In December 2020, the system announced its largest gift ever, a $42 million donation from JoAnn and Bob Glick. Although none of the gift will finance construction of the new hospital, the building will be named The MetroHealth Glick Center in honor of the Glicks.

The new 11-floor hospital, located on Scranton Road just south of the hospital's Emergency Department, opened in November 2022.

Turner Construction Co. servied as construction manager for the project.

Hammel, Green and Abrahamson, Inc. (HGA) led design planning, architecture and engineering.

== Neighborhood revitalization ==
MetroHealth's main campus is located in Cleveland's Clark-Fulton neighborhood, one of the city's poorest and most densely populated neighborhoods. The health system has made revitalizing the neighborhood a priority and is using its Campus Transformation as a catalyst in that effort.

Working with residents, lawmakers and local community groups, MetroHealth created the first hospital-led EcoDistrict in the world, the MetroHealth Community District.

The system is undertaking multiple neighborhood revitalization efforts, including:

Public transit – In 2017, MetroHealth and the Greater Cleveland Regional Transit Authority partnered to create the MetroHealth Line bus-rapid-transit (BRT) system.

Public safety – MetroHealth has announced plans to move the system's more-than-75-officer police force into new headquarters constructed in the neighborhood, on West 25th Street.

Digital connectivity – The system has announced plans to join with tech partners to bring affordable internet access to up to 1,000 households near its campus.

Housing – In June 2019, MetroHealth announced plans for three new apartment buildings. One, a building offering up to 72 affordable units, is under construction on its campus. In total, the $60 million-plus project will provide at least 250 new apartments to the nearby neighborhood. Each of the apartment buildings will have a first floor dedicated to making life easier for residents of the neighborhood, including commercial space for a mix of amenities including restaurants, a grocery store and an Economic Opportunity Center offering job training and other services.

== Leadership ==
Christine Alexander-Rager, MD, was appointed Acting President and CEO on July 26, 2024.

== Locations ==
MetroHealth has health centers, offices and clinics throughout Greater Cleveland:

- Beachwood Health Center
- Bedford Medical Offices
- Brecksville Health and Surgery Center
- Broadway Health Center
- Brooklyn Health Center
- Brunswick Health Center
- Buckeye Health Center
- Cleveland Heights Medical Center
- Glenville Community Health Center
- Lakewood Recovery Resources
- LGBT Community Center of Greater Cleveland
- Lyndhurst Health Center
- Medina Health Center
- MetroHealth Medical Center Main Campus
- Middleburg Heights November Family Health Center
- Midtown Recovery Resources
- Ohio City Family Dentistry
- Ohio City Health Center
- Old Brooklyn Medical Center
- Old Brooklyn Recovery Resources
- Parma Medical Center
- Rocky River Medical Offices
- State Road Family Practice
- West 150th Health and Surgery Center
- West Park Health Center
- Westlake Health Center
- West Shore YMCA (physical therapy)

LifeFlight Helicopter Bases

- Portage County
- Lorain County
- Wayne County
