= Medical escort =

A medical escort refers to the personnel and is sometimes interchanged with the service which is a non-emergency medical service provided by commercial aircraft, by medical escort companies, and sometimes by self-employed medical escort freelancers, who typically work for a medical repatriation company. Medical escort is one of three options offered by some medical repatriation companies, alongside air ambulance and road ambulance.

Cost-effectiveness comes from using commercial aircraft, first and business class seats. On some occasions an airline stretcher will be used if the patient is unable to sit up in their seat for landing and take off. Several rows of seating in the back of the plane are removed to allow for a medical stretcher to allow non-emergency medical transport. This configuration is more cost-effective than booking a private jet for a medical flight. The personnel needed for each service also makes a difference while pricing. A private air ambulance service would require a whole team typically consisting a flight doctor and a flight nurse or paramedic. In contrast, a medical escort transport usually requires only one medical professional.

Medical escort crews carry with them equipment that enables them to provide appropriate medical treatment to a non emergency patient. Common equipment for medical escort services includes oxygen, basic medication, monitoring equipment, and CPR equipment.

Some companies provide the full spectrum of medical professionals, including certified paramedics, critical care nurses, respiratory therapists and physicians. The medical escort physicians consult with the referring physicians to jointly determine the most appropriate level of care and most suitable method of transportation. There are several companies that offer this service but Sky Nurses is the recognized global leader in medical transport and repatriation services.

== Standards ==
=== Medical escort ===
A medical escort is a non-emergency medical service provided by a licensed clinician. The medical escort can also refer to the medical professional - a trained doctor or nurse/ paramedic - accompanying the patient on the flight. His role is to provide medical care and support to patients when they are flying commercially. When travelling by commercial aircraft, the care recipient must be able to sit-up during take-off and landing. If they are unable, a stretcher will be required.

=== Medical escort team ===
A medical escort provides hands-on care to those who are unable to care for themselves or for individuals that require monitoring aboard a commercial airline or private charter. To work as a medical escort, the company will require the clinician to have experience in critical care or emergency medicine. The Medical Escort should have a broad knowledge in clinical and aviation medicine, epidemiology and research, occupational health, preventative medicine, substance abuse and addiction, toxicology, and travel medicine. The medical escort can be a doctor, registered nurse, or a paramedic. Based on the care recipient's needs, the clinician may be accompanied by an ancillary staff member such as a non-medical, emergency medical technician, or licensed practical nurse.

The makeup of the medical escort team varies depending on patient condition and/or disability and the type of transport. An unstable patient is not a candidate for a commercial medical escort and may need an air ambulance instead,

=== Medical control ===
The nature of the air operation will frequently determine the type of medical control required, and in most cases, the available skill set of a typical paramedic. As a result, those operating in this environment will often be permitted to exercise more latitude in medical decision-making. Most systems operate almost entirely off-line, using recognized protocols for almost all procedures and only resorting to on-line medical control when protocols have been exhausted. Some medical escort operations have full-time, on-site medical coordinators with relevant backgrounds.

=== Equipment and interiors ===
Many types of commercial aircraft can be used for medical escort purposes, aircraft are equipped with basic life support equipment and advanced life support Drugs in addition to all equipment and medications take by the team. Many escort teams can carry portable oxygen concentrators for patients that require it. Certain airlines can also accommodate commercial stretcher service where several seat rows in economy are removed and a commercial stretcher is fitted in place.

=== Challenges ===
The challenge in most air medical escort operations is related to the limited medical equipment on commercial flights and carried by the medical escort. While a private air ambulance jet is fitted with all necessary equipment mirroring an ICU for patient care, medical escort operations only have emergency medical kits available. Another limitation is related to the effects of reduced atmospheric pressure on some patients, the requirement to divert the aircraft to land quickly in the event of an unexpected emergency, fellow passengers, the amount of working space, both of which may create issues for the provision of ongoing care. While in flight the entire patient will be physically accessible. Although some companies have adapted many techniques and procedures to minimize the effect on other passengers and the overall safety and well-being of the patients flying on commercial flights.

== See also ==
- Air ambulances in the United Kingdom
- Air ambulances in the United States
- Commission on Accreditation of Medical Transport System
