= Air Evac Lifeteam =

Air ambulance service

Air Evac EMS, Inc.
- Founded: 1985; 41 years ago in West Plains, Missouri
- Operating bases: 140+
- Alliance: AirMedCare Network
- Fleet size: Approx. 152 helicopters; 2 fixed-wing aircraft
- Parent company: Global Medical Response
- Headquarters: O'Fallon, Missouri, United States
- Key people: Seth Myers (president)
- Website: lifeteam.net

Air Evac EMS, Inc., operating as Air Evac Lifeteam and sometimes called simply Air Evac, is an American helicopter emergency medical service (HEMS) or air ambulance provider headquartered in O'Fallon, Missouri. It is the largest subsidiary of Global Medical Response, though still considered an independent provider. It is also the largest membership-supported air ambulance service in the US operating helicopters from 140 bases in 15 states, mostly in the central and southern regions of the country.

== History ==
Air Evac EMS, Inc. was founded in 1985 to serve the rural Missouri Ozark area and was originally headquartered in West Plains, Missouri. At the time, air ambulances were primarily based in metropolitan areas but Air Evac's founders believed that residents of rural areas, often far from hospitals, had the most critical need for these services. From the beginning, the company has focused on medically underserved areas in the rural US including those not adequately served by other air ambulance providers.

Air Evac Lifeteam was accredited in 2008 by the Commission on Accreditation of Medical Transport Systems, and is the largest medical transport program under one name to achieve this accreditation. In 2013, the company moved its headquarters, dispatch (CenComm), and a few other departments to a new facility in O'Fallon, Missouri.

== Operations ==
Air Evac Lifeteam is a subsidiary of American medical transportation holding company Global Medical Response, based in Lewisville, Texas. As of 2021, Air Evac had more than 140 bases operating in 15 states, mainly in the US Midwest and Southeast.

=== Finances ===
Charges for air transport services can be significant. However, patients are not always responsible for the full amount charged with reimbursement from private health insurance providers or government programs Medicare and Medicaid covering all or a portion of eligible costs. According to a July 2019 opinion from a panel of 8th U.S. Circuit Court of Appeals judges, in 2014 Air Evac charged an average of over $30,000 per trip. In 2015, the median cost of air transport in the US was $10,199 while median Medicaid reimbursement per trip was $5,998 according to a 2017 study commissioned by the Association of Air Medical Services. According to a 2019 statement from Air Evac president Seth Myers, over 70% of transported patients have no insurance or are covered by Medicare or Medicaid.

In addition to patient payments and reimbursements from private and government health programs, part of the company's revenue comes from its membership program which is part of the AirMedCare Network. Membership is not required to receive service but in some cases, though not all, it may reduce or eliminate charges billed to the patient for transportation service.

=== Clinical care ===
Critical care air medical transport in general has the advantage of providing advanced care prior to and during transport at a level otherwise available only in regional emergency and critical care units.

Air Evac provides emergency medical/critical care to patients in the field and interfacility setting. Each Air Evac medical flight crew is composed of a paramedic and a nurse. The paramedic/nurse configuration combines two fields with complementary skills and experience. The pre-hospital background of the paramedic complements the critical care experience of the nurse. Crews provide advanced skills such as: Rapid sequence intubation, Balloon Pump management and transport, ventilator management, radiological and EKG interpretation, fibrinolytics, surgical and needle cricothyrotomies, pleural decompression, and arterial/invasive monitoring.

=== Staff ===
==== Medical ====
Air Evac employs more than 600 flight nurses and 600 flight paramedics who serve on its medical flight crews, with one nurse and one paramedic serving on each mission. Paramedics and nurses are required to have a minimum of 3 years critical care experience, with the average being 12 and 13 years respectively, as well as relevant medical and emergency medical certification.

==== Medical direction ====
Medical direction is provided by 15 board certified medical directors located in each of the states served by the company. The company also employs a Chief Medical Director as well as pediatric and OB specialists. Collectively, medical directors are responsible for defining and updating the company's medical protocols and standing orders. They also ensure that medical crews are in compliance with medical regulations in each state and review QA/QI information and are involved with hiring and training new employees as well as flight crew biannual training.

==== Pilots ====
Air Evac's pilots are required to be instrument rated and receive air medical training under its proprietary Federal Aviation Administration-approved program. Each is required to undergo an 18-day course covering operational and procedural instruction, as well as aircraft and mission-specific training (flying at night and landing on unimproved rural terrain, such as pastures and fields and roadways) in both helicopter models operated by the company. Base assignment requires rigorous local flight orientation training to become an authority on local terrain, hospitals and landmarks. Recurring training includes an annual Part 135/NVG check-ride.

== Aircraft ==
Air Evac owns and operates over 150 Bell 206 L1+ Long Ranger and about a dozen Bell 407 helicopters with each being equipped for medical services. The company has flown the Bell 206 LongRanger since its founding citing the model's reliability, efficiency, agility and safety record. While these aircraft are widely used and regarded as safe aircraft, in comparison to other airframes used, they are cramped for space which can sometimes make patient care difficult.

In addition the company also operates an Airbus AS350 and several EC 130 and EC 135 aircraft.
