= List of cemeteries in Texas =

This list of cemeteries in Texas includes currently operating, historical (closed for new interments), and defunct (graves abandoned or removed) cemeteries, columbaria, and mausolea which are historical and/or notable. It does not include pet cemeteries.

NRHP: National Register of Historic Places. HTC: Historic Texas Cemetery.

== Anderson County ==
- Elkhart Myrtle Springs Cemetery, Elkhart; HTC designated

== Atascosa County ==
- Brite Cemetery, East of Leming; HTC designated

== Bastrop County ==
- Fairview Cemetery (Bastrop, Texas); HTC designated
- Rosanky Cemetery, Rosanky, Texas; HTC designated

== Bell County ==
- Bellwood Memorial Park, Temple
- Moffat Cemetery, Moffat, Texas; HTC designated

== Bexar County ==
- Cathedral of San Fernando, San Antonio; contains tombs
- Davenport Cemetery, Selma; HTC designated
- Fort Sam Houston National Cemetery, San Antonio
- McCulloch Cemetery, San Antonio; HTC designated
- Old San Antonio City Cemeteries Historic District, San Antonio; NRHP-listed
- San Antonio National Cemetery, San Antonio; NRHP-listed

== Bowie County ==
- Rose Hill Cemetery, Texarkana

== Brazoria County ==
- Gulf Prairie Cemetery, Jones Creek (formerly Peach Point Plantation Cemetery)
- Houston Memorial Gardens, Pearland

== Burnet County ==
- Marble Falls City Cemetery, Marble Falls; HTC designated

== Cass County ==
- Whittaker Memorial Cemetery, near Kildare (formerly Whittaker Plantation Cemetery)

== Collin County ==
- Farmersville Islamic cemetery, Farmersville

== Colorado County ==
- Alleyton Cemetery, Alleyton; HTC designated
- Trinity Lutheran Church Cemetery, Frelsburg; HTC designated

== Dallas County ==
- Calvary Hill Cemetery, Dallas
- Dallas–Fort Worth National Cemetery, Dallas
- Freedman's Cemetery, Dallas
- Greenwood Cemetery, Dallas
- Grove Hill Memorial Park, Dallas
- Laurel Land Memorial Park, Dallas
- Oakland Cemetery, Dallas
- Old Letot Cemetery, Dallas
- Pioneer Park Cemetery, Dallas
- Restland Memorial Park, Dallas
- Sparkman-Hillcrest Memorial Park Cemetery, Dallas
- Western Heights Cemetery, Dallas

== El Paso County ==
- Concordia Cemetery, El Paso
- Fort Bliss National Cemetery, Fort Bliss, near El Paso

== Galveston County ==
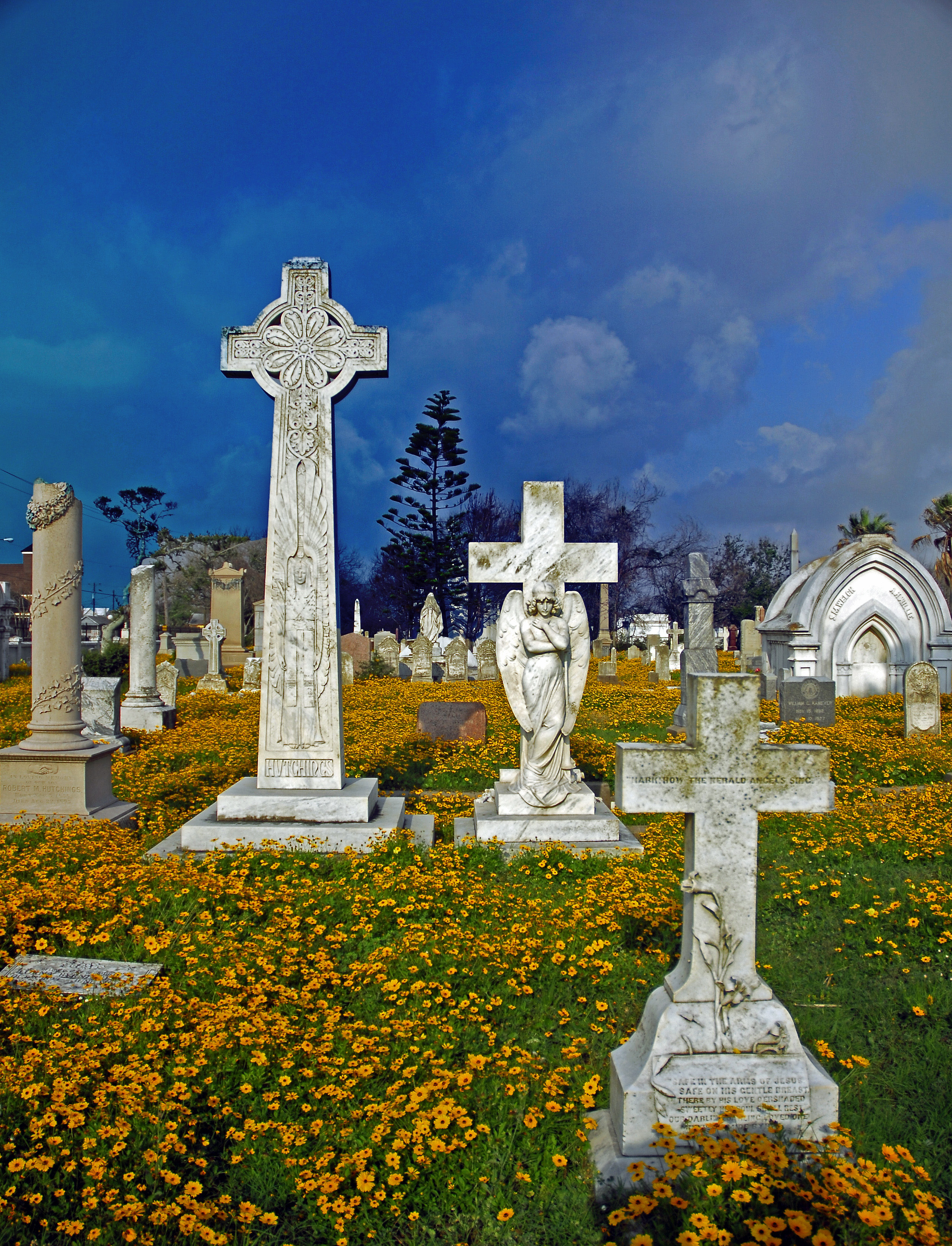
Broadway Cemetery Historic District in Galveston, Galveston County

- Broadway Cemetery Historic District, Galveston; NRHP-listed
- Congregation Beth Jacob Cemetery, Congregation Beth Jacob, Galveston

== Gillespie County ==
- Der Stadt Friedhof, Fredericksburg

== Goliad, County ==
- La Bahia Cemetery, Goliad, Texas; HTC designated

== Guadalupe County ==
- Lone Oak Cemetery, near Geronimo; HTC designated
- Warncke Cemetery, New Berlin; HTC designated

== Harris County ==
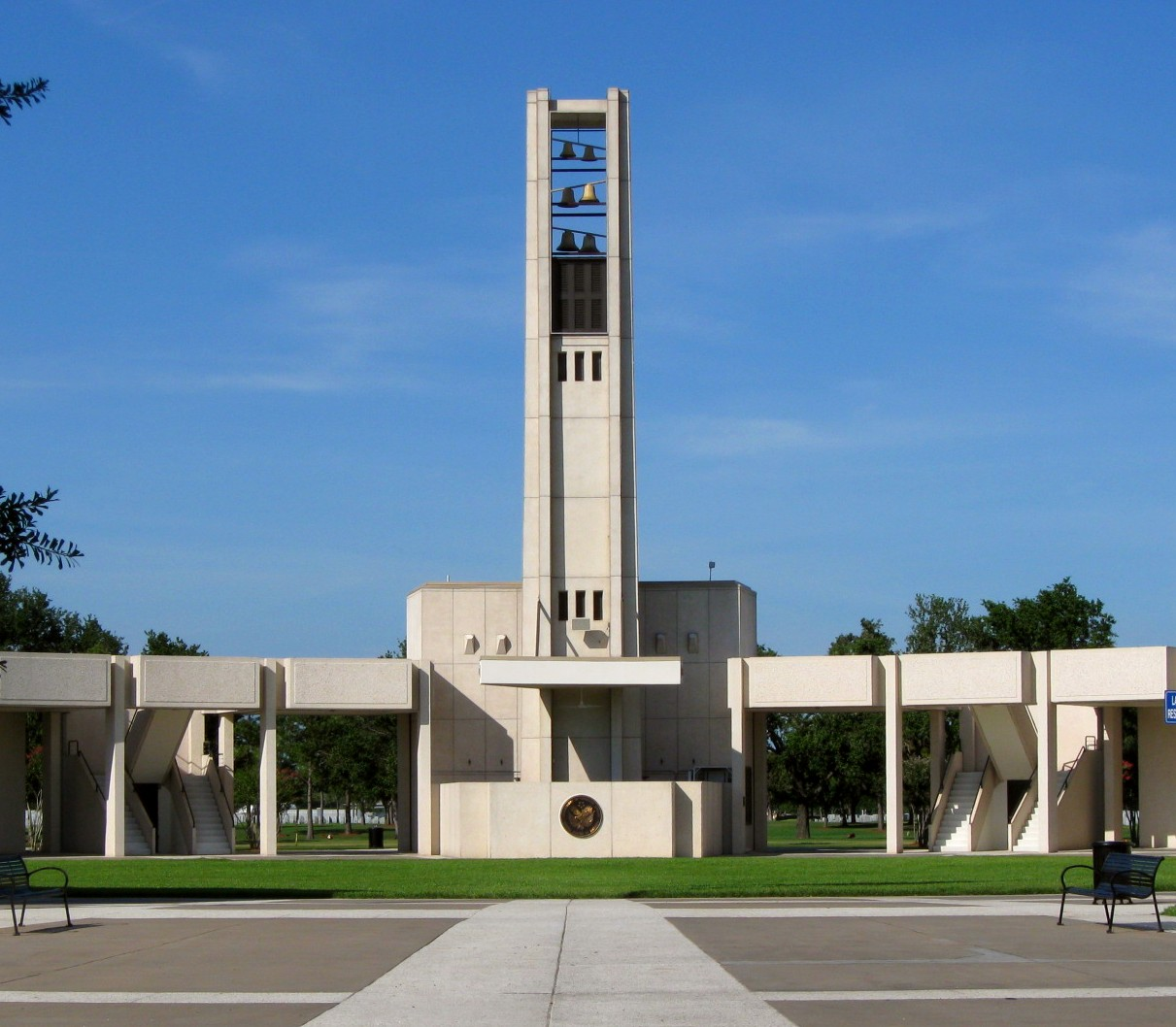
The Hemicycle at Houston National Cemetery in Houston, Harris County

- Congregation Beth Israel Cemetery, Congregation Beth Israel, Houston
- Forest Park Lawndale Cemetery, Houston
- Founders Memorial Cemetery, Houston
- Glenwood Cemetery, Houston
- Houston National Cemetery, Houston; NRHP-listed
- Paradise North Cemetery, Houston
- Olivewood Cemetery, Houston
- Woodlawn Garden of Memories Cemetery, Houston; NRHP-listed

== Hays County ==
- Kyle Family Pioneer Cemetery, near Kyle, Texas; HTC designated

== Hidalgo County ==
- Jackson Ranch Church Cemetery and Eli Jackson Cemetery, Jackson Ranch Church

== Howard County ==
- Trinity Memorial Park, Houston

== Houston County ==
- Concord Cemetery, ENE of Crockett; HTC designated
- Parker Cemetery, NE of Crockett; HTC designated

== Jefferson County ==
- Forest Lawn Memorial Park, Beaumont

== Kerr County ==
- Kerrville National Cemetery, Kerrville

== Llano County ==
- Baby Head Cemetery, Llano
- Sandy Mountain Cemetery, Sunrise Beach Village; HTC designated

== Lubbock County ==
- Eastlawn Memorial Gardens, Lubbock

== Marion County ==
- Oakwood Cemetery, Jefferson

== McLennan County ==
- Oakwood Cemetery, Waco

== Montague County, Texas ==
- Elmwood Cemetery, Bowie, Texas; HTC designated

== Nueces County ==
- Old Bayview Cemetery, Corpus Christi
- Seaside Memorial Park, Corpus Christi

== Randall County ==
- Llano Cemetery, Amarillo

== Rusk County ==
- Old Shiloh Cemetery, Mount Enterprise

== Starr County ==
- Old Rio Grande City Cemetery, Rio Grande City; HTC designated

== Tarrant County ==
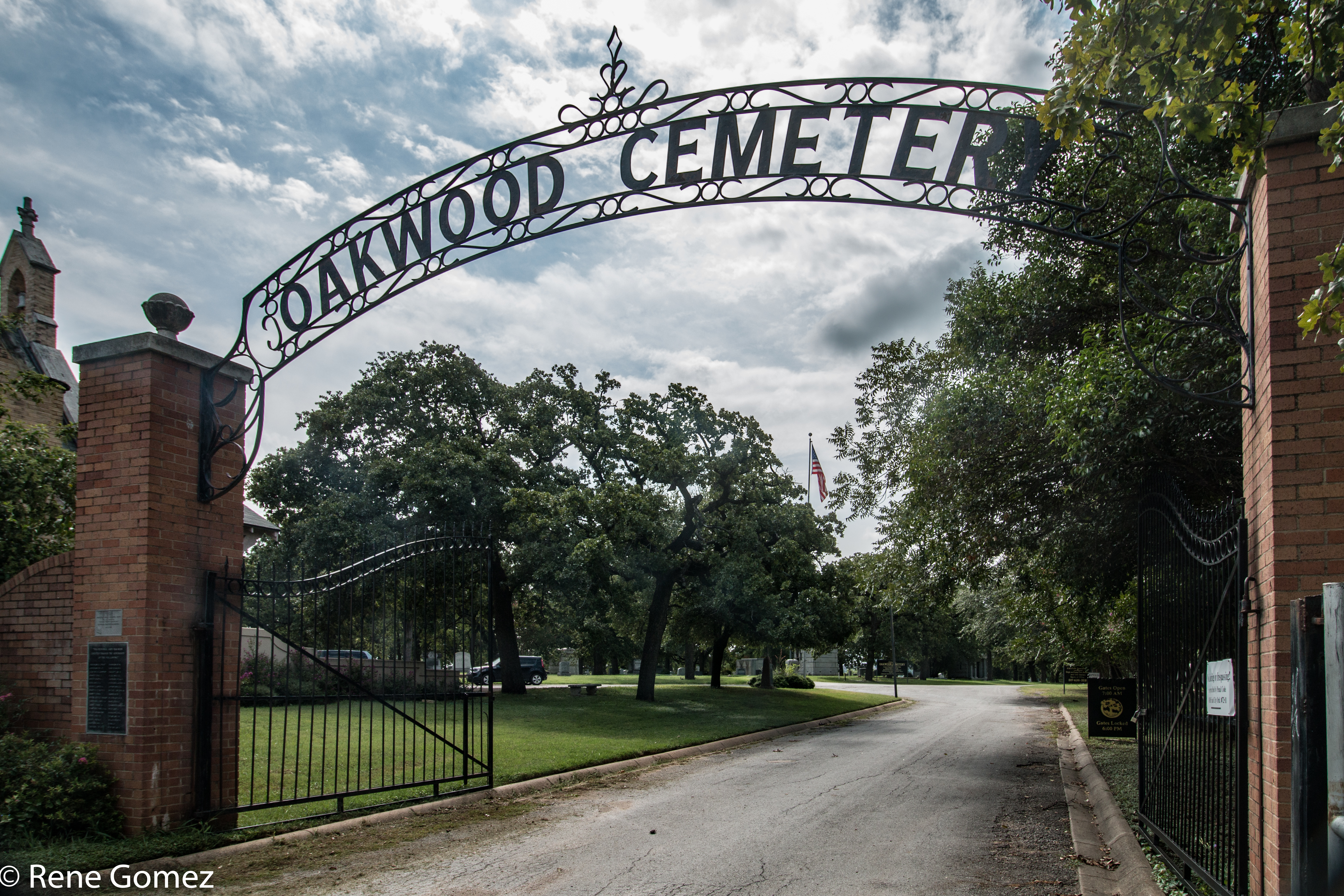
Oakwood Cemetery in Fort Worth, Tarrant County

- Greenwood Memorial Park, Fort Worth
- Mount Olivet Cemetery, Fort Worth
- Oakwood Cemetery, Fort Worth; NRHP-listed
- Pioneers Rest, Fort Worth; NRHP-listed

== Taylor County ==
- Elmwood Memorial Park, Abilene

== Travis County ==
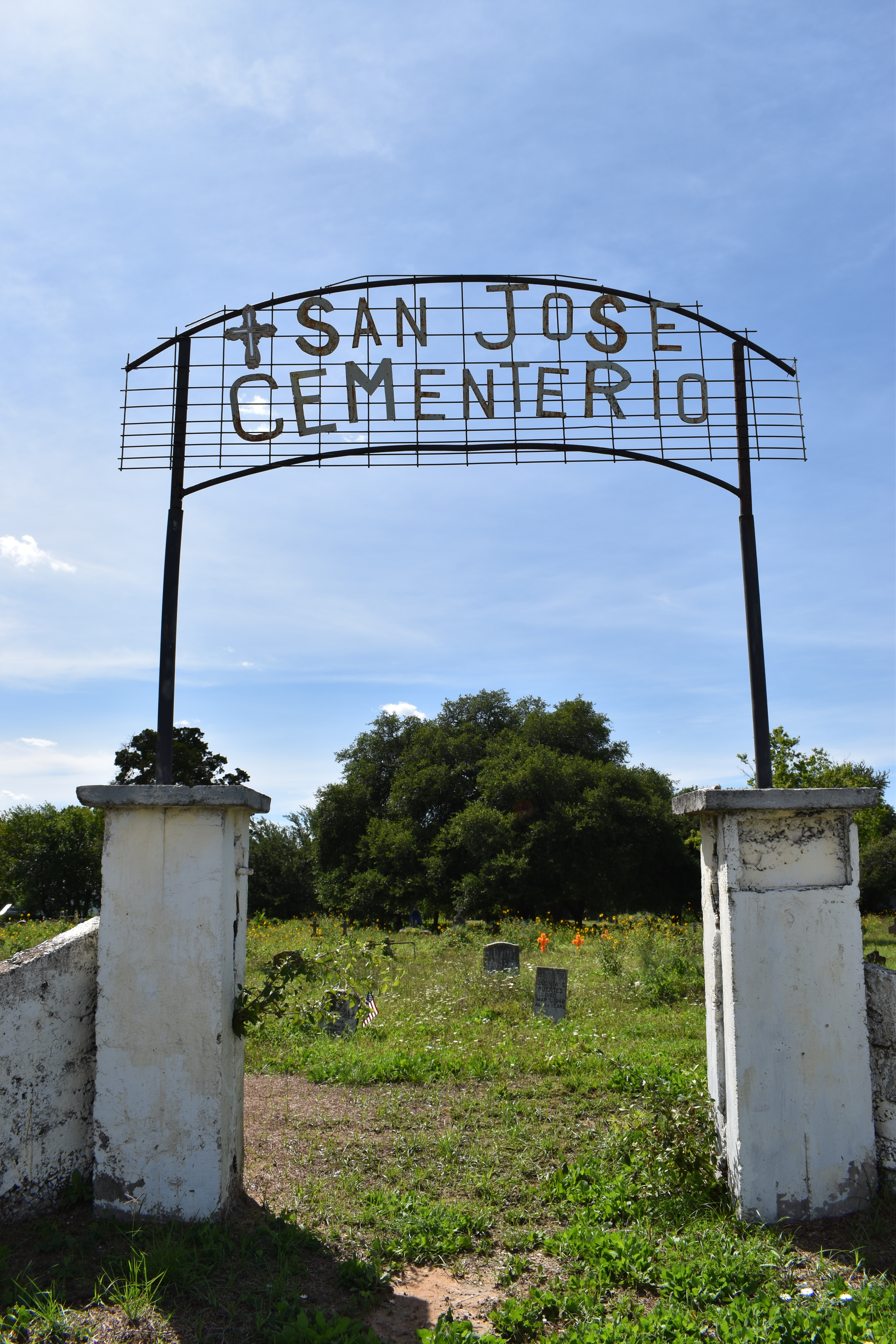
San Jose Cemetery (San Jose Cementerio) in Austin, Travis County

- Capital Memorial Park, Austin
- Moline Swedish Lutheran Cemetery, Elroy
- Oakwood Cemetery, Austin
- San Jose Cemetery, Austin
- Texas State Cemetery, Austin; NRHP-listed

== Walker County ==
- Captain Joe Byrd Cemetery, Huntsville
- Oakwood Cemetery, Huntsville

== Washington County ==
- Old Independence Cemetery, Independence
- Prairie Lea Cemetery, Brenham, Texas; HTC designated

== Williamson County ==
- Connell Cemetery, North of Liberty Hill; HTC designated
- IOOF Cemetery, Georgetown
- Old Georgetown Cemetery, Georgetown
- Round Rock Cemetery, Round Rock

== See also ==
- List of cemeteries in the United States
- Pioneer cemetery
