= Freedmen's Cemetery =

Freedmen's Cemetery (or Freedman's Cemetery) may refer to:

- Freedmen's Cemetery (Louisiana), St. Bernard Parish, Louisiana
- Freedman's Cemetery (Texas), also known as Freedmen's Cemetery, Dallas, Texas
- Contrabands and Freedmen Cemetery, Alexandria, Virginia
- Oak Grove-Freedman's Cemetery, Salisbury, North Carolina
- Freedmen's Mission Historic Cemetery, Knoxville, Tennessee
- Section 20 of Arlington National Cemetery
