= Broadway Cemetery Historic District =

Historic district in Galveston, Texas, United States

- U.S. National Register of Historic Places
- U.S. Historic district
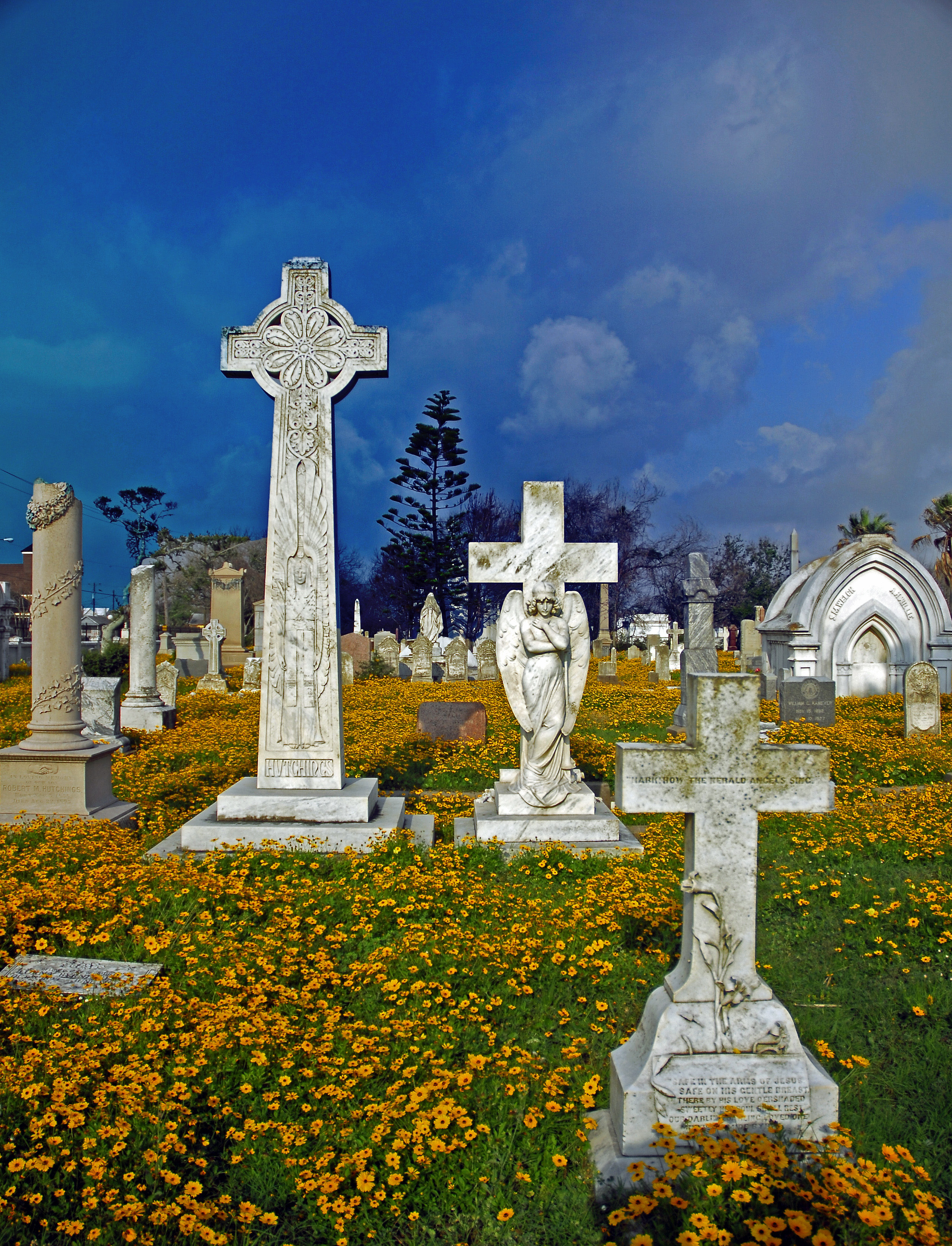
- The Old City Cemetery in Galveston, Texas

- Location within Texas Location within the United States
- Interactive map of Broadway Cemetery Historic District
- Location: Six city blocks between Broadway Avenue (north) and Avenue L (south) and 43rd Street (west) and 40th Street (east); Galveston, Galveston County, Texas, U.S.
- Coordinates: 29.2935°N 94.8129°W
- Area: 15.27 acres (6.18 ha)
- Built: 1839
- Architectural style: Beaux Arts, Colonial Revival, Gothic Revival, Neoclassical, Renaissance Revival
- NRHP reference No.: 14000340
- Added to NRHP: June 13, 2014

The Broadway Cemetery Historic District, also known as the Broadway Cemeteries, is a six-block collective of seven separate cemeteries in the city of Galveston, Texas, covering an area of 15.27 acres (6.18 ha). As of 2014, an estimated 6,000 people were buried in the district, including multiple prominent Galveston citizens. As of 2014, all cemeteries are still accepting new interments, although these are sporadic. The district was listed on the National Register of Historic Places in 2014.

== History ==
Galveston, Texas, was hit hard with nine yellow fever epidemics between 1839 and 1867, necessitating additional public burial sites. At the time, it was the largest city in Texas and was the seaport of entry for the state. It is estimated that in 1853, 60 percent of its population was affected by the yellow fever crisis, with a death toll of 523. The island's last yellow fever epidemic in 1867 killed hundreds and caused thousands of residents to flee. One resident who stayed behind remembered that the victims "died on the island like sheep."

By 1912, the stretch of 42nd Street that separated Evergreen and Hebrew Benevolent Society Cemeteries from the others was closed and removed, creating one contiguous complex. Avenue K was narrowed between 1926 and 1928 to facilitate more burials.

On June 13, 2014, the complex was listed on the National Register of Historic Places.

== Cemeteries ==
Seven separate cemeteries make up the historic district. As of 2014, about 6,000 people had been buried across all of the Broadway Cemeteries; about 85% of these burials took place between 1839 and 1864. Most of the recent burials (post-1940) have taken place in Oleander and Old Catholic Cemeteries.

=== Old City Cemetery (1839) ===
Located in the northeast corner of the complex, the Old City Cemetery was the first cemetery established as part of the original town charter in 1839. The cemetery measures approximately 288 ft (88 m) by 383.5 ft (116.9 m) and includes about 1,500 interments, over 90% of which took place before 1964.

Its history is the source of rumors and folklore. It is alleged to be haunted by Thomas Nicaragua Smith, executed as a deserter from the Confederate Army during the American Civil War. The remains of Elize Alberti and her family also come with a legend: she is alleged to have murdered her own children.

=== Oleander Cemetery (1839) ===
Established in 1839 as Potter's Field Cemetery adjacent to the Old City Cemetery, it was originally set aside for the burial of unclaimed or indigent people. During the Franklin D. Roosevelt New Deal Works Progress Administration (WPA) agenda, a Galveston city ordinance renamed it Oleander Cemetery in 1939. During this period, the cemetery was reconfigured. Oleander Cemetery was the site of the earliest Jewish burials, with the southeast corner set aside for them. About 1,000 people are buried here.

=== Old Catholic Cemetery (c. 1844) ===
The first Catholic cemetery in Galveston was created by the Archdiocese of Galveston-Houston around 1844 and includes about 900 interments.

=== Trinity Episcopal Cemetery (1844) ===
This was created in 1844 on land deeded to the Rector of the Episcopal Church. A brick wall and concrete walks were added later. There are estimated to be over 1,000 interments.

=== New City Cemetery (1867) ===
Originally the Old Cahill Cemetery or the Yellow Fever Cemetery, the earliest burials date to 1867. It was expanded as the New City Cemetery in response to the 1900 Galveston hurricane that claimed thousands of lives. Overall, about 650 people are buried here.

=== Hebrew Benevolent Society Cemetery (1868) ===
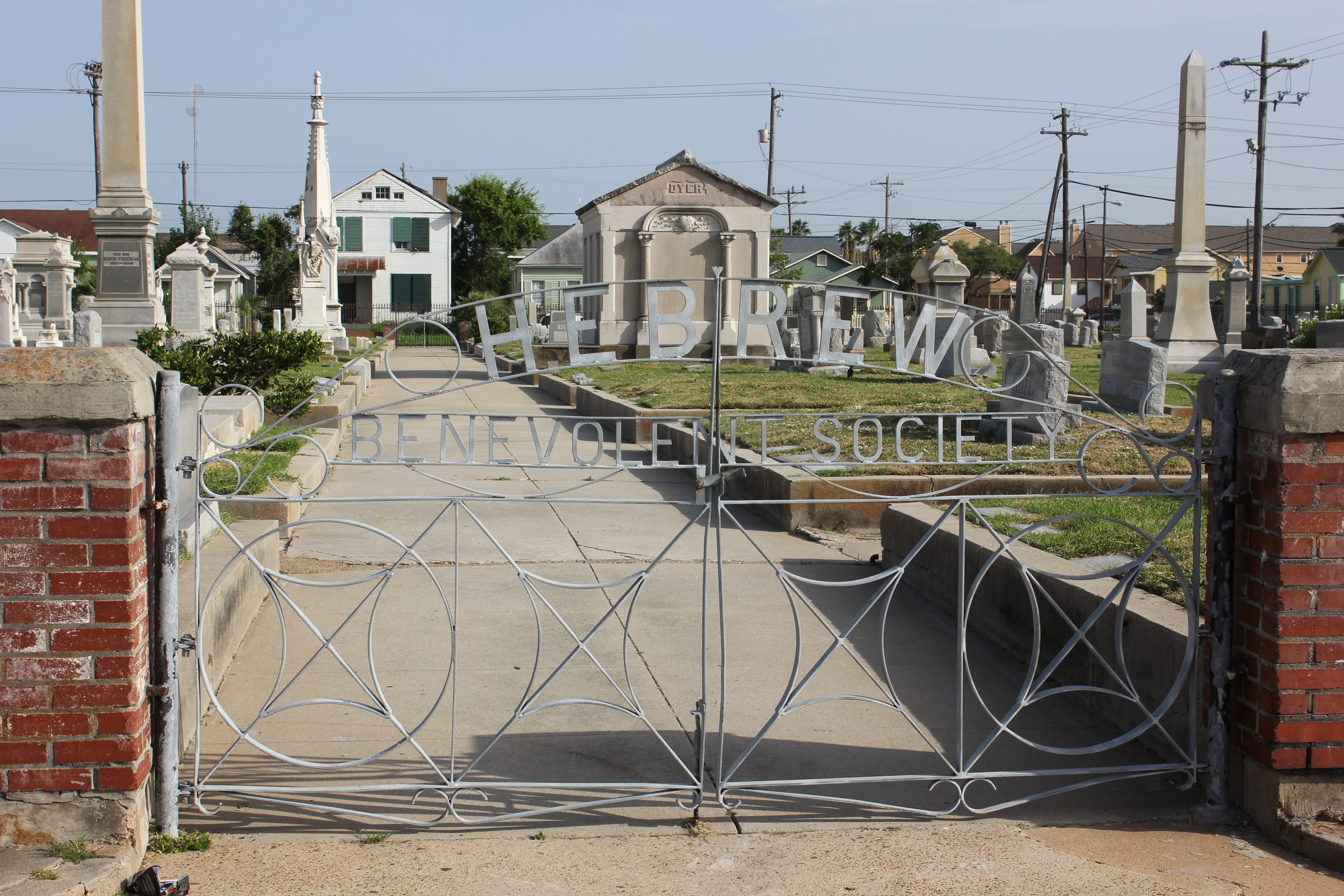
Gate of the Hebrew Benevolent Society Cemetery

The Hebrew Benevolent Society Cemetery contains more than 500 interments. Isadore Dyer donated a plot of land in 1852, for use by the Jewish Cemetery Association. The first individual burial plots were acquired in 1867 and 1897.

=== Evergreen Cemetery (c. 1900) ===
Originally called the New Cahill Cemetery or Cahill Yard, it was founded c. 1900 and renamed to Evergreen Cemetery in 1923. Its original purpose was to house the remains of victims of the 1900 Galveston hurricane. About 900 interments have been made.

== Layout and architecture ==
The cemetery complex is bounded by Broadway Avenue to the north, 40th Street to the east, Avenue L to the south, and 43rd Street to the west. Avenue K runs through the center of the complex, leaving Old City, Oleander, and Evergreen Cemeteries on its north side and New City, Old Catholic, Episcopal, and Hebrew Benevolent Cemeteries on its south. A cast-iron fence surrounds the whole district, with gates interspersed along its bordering streets.

The architectural styles displayed in these cemeteries run a gamut of late-19th and early-20th century revival styles: Beaux Arts, Colonial Revival, Gothic Revival, Neoclassical, and Renaissance Revival. Graves are often marked with symbols corresponding to the deceased's religion, ethnicity, or fraternal or secret society. Other decorative markings include lambs, willow trees, and flowers. Many mausoleums serve as family burial chambers and were designed in Grecian or Roman Revival styles.

The district also includes several memorials to various events and conflicts, including Confederate casualties of the Civil War, Republic of Texas founders and veterans, and the 1861 sinking of the USS Varuna.

== Notable interments ==
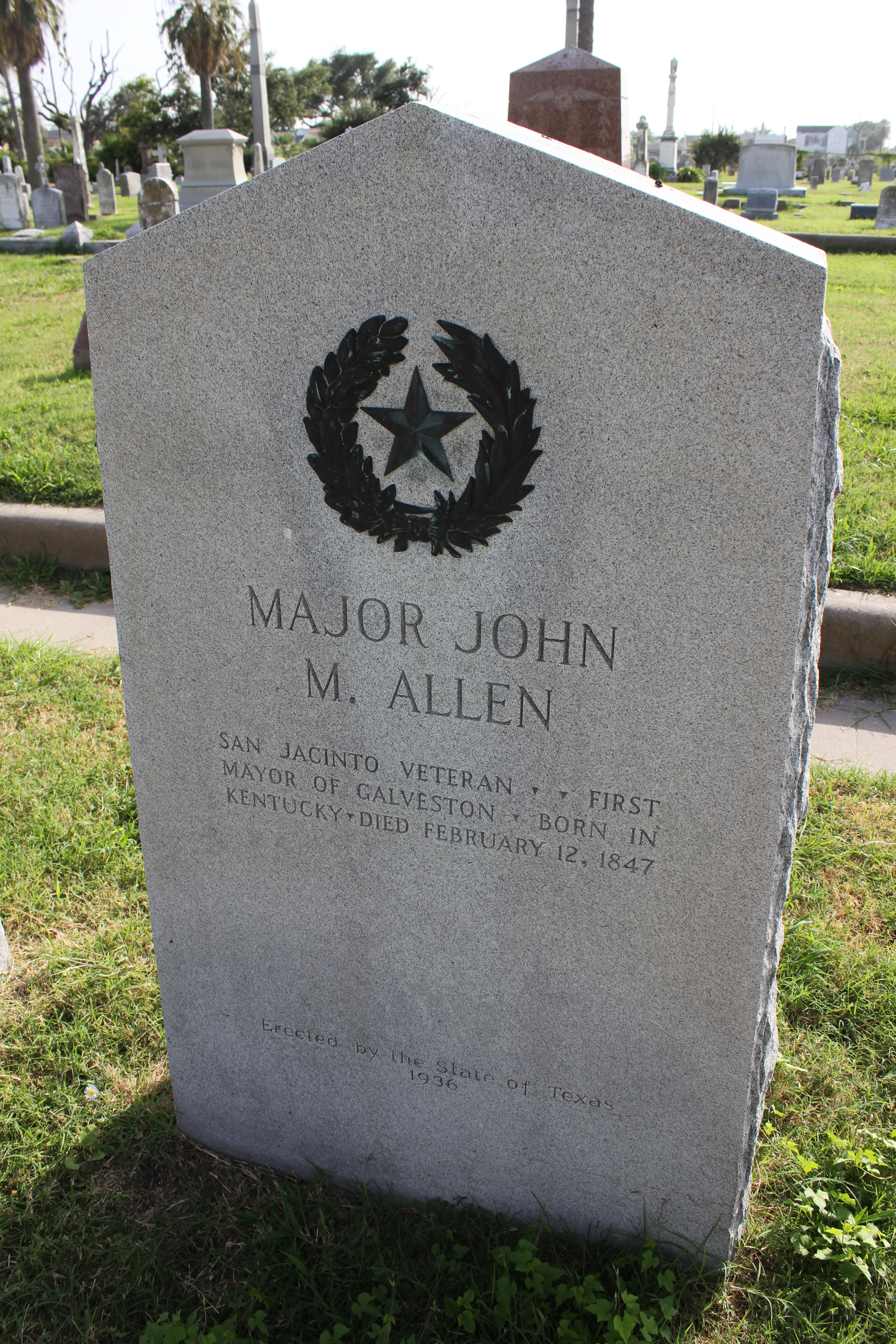
John Allen's grave marker

Several notable people are buried in the complex. Several participated in the Texas War of Independence, Mexican–American War, or American Civil War; the founding of the Republic of Texas and later statehood; and in the development of Galveston itself.

=== New City Cemetery ===
- George F. Robie (1844–1891), American Civil War veteran and Medal of Honor recipient

=== Old City Cemetery ===
- Michel Branamour Menard (1805–1856), founder of Galveston
- Charlotte Walker (1876–1958), actress

=== Trinity Episcopal Cemetery ===
- John Melville Allen (d. 1847), first mayor of Galveston
- George Childress (1804–1841), author of the Texas Declaration of Independence
- Warren D. C. Hall (1794–1867), Secretary of War for the Republic of Texas
- Sara Haden (1899–1981), actress
- Edward Lea (1837–1863), United States Navy officer killed in the Battle of Galveston
- James Love, U.S. Representative
- John B. Magruder (1807–1871), American and Confederate military officer
- Louis Wigfall (1816–1874), Confederate States Senator of Texas
- Samuel May Williams (1795–1858), Texan politician and businessman
- Asa H. Willie (1829–1899), U.S. Representative

== See also ==
- History of Galveston, Texas
- List of cemeteries in Texas
- National Register of Historic Places listings in Galveston County, Texas
- Recorded Texas Historic Landmarks in Galveston County

== Additional sourcing ==
- Wolfe, Mark (2014). "Broadway Cemetery Historic District" (PDF). NPS. United States Department of the Interior.
- "Recent Listing: Broadway Cemetery Historic District, Galveston | THC.Texas.gov – Texas Historical Commission". Texas Historic Sites Atlas. Texas Historical Commission.
- "Broadway Cemetery Historic District, Galveston, TX". Historic Houston. November 18, 2015.
- "Details – Broadway Cemetery Historic District – Atlas Number 2014000340 – Atlas: Texas Historical Commission". atlas.thc.state.tx.us. Texas Historical Commission.
- "The Ghosts of Broadway Cemetery on Galveston Island". Ghost City Tours.
