= El Camino Real de los Tejas National Historic Trail =

Colonial trail in Texas and Louisiana

Coordinates: 30.30077°N 97.73510°W

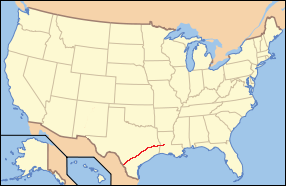
- Location of trail
- Interactive map of El Camino Real de los Tejas National Historic Trail
- Location: Texas, Louisiana; USA
- Nearest city: Natchitoches, LA (start) & Laredo, TX
- Established: 2004
- Governing body: National Park Service
- Website: El Camino Real de los Tejas National Historic Trail

The El Camino Real de los Tejas National Historic Trail, also known as the Old San Antonio Road, is a national historic trail covering the U.S. section of El Camino Real de Los Tejas, a thoroughfare from the 18th-century Spanish colonial era in Spanish Texas, instrumental in the settlement, development, and history of Texas. The National Park Service designated El Camino Real de los Tejas National Historic Trail as a unit in the National Trails System in 2004.

The modern highways Texas 21 (along with Texas OSR) and Louisiana 6 roughly follow the original route of the trail.

== History ==
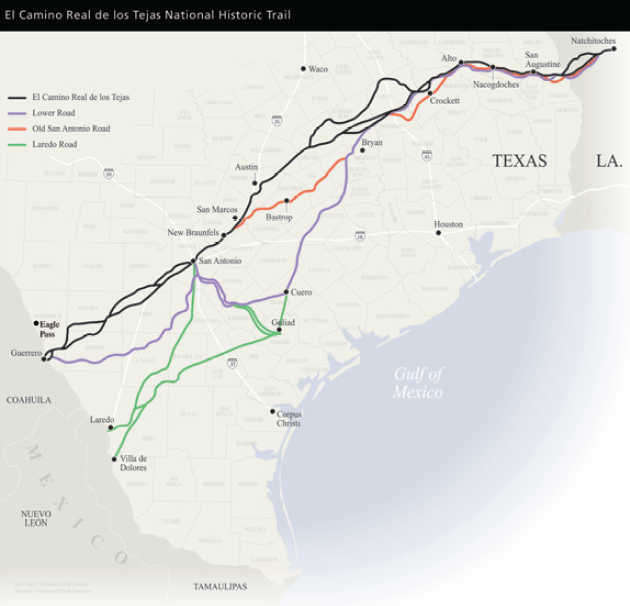
El Camino Real de los Tejas routes in Spanish Texas

Alonso de León, Spanish governor of Coahuila, established the corridor for what became El Camino Real de Tierra Afuera in multiple expeditions to East Texas between 1686 and 1690 to find and destroy a French fort near Lavaca Bay, established by René-Robert Cavelier, Sieur de La Salle on what de León considered to be Spanish lands. The route was refined in 1691-1692 by Domingo Terán de los Ríos, the first governor of Spanish Texas, in an effort to make better connections to the Spanish missions in East Texas. San Antonio de Bexar, founded in 1718, was the first of many communities built as way stations on the trail.

After Mexico achieved independence from Spain in 1821, immigrants from the American colonies invited to Texas used the corridor to travel to their settlements. A section of the road called Camino Arriba by the Spanish became known as the Old San Antonio Road. The growth of towns such as Austin, Galveston, and Houston not on the original route, along with the building of railroads, changed the direction of travel and trade and the use of El Camino Real de los Tejas diminished.

== Route ==
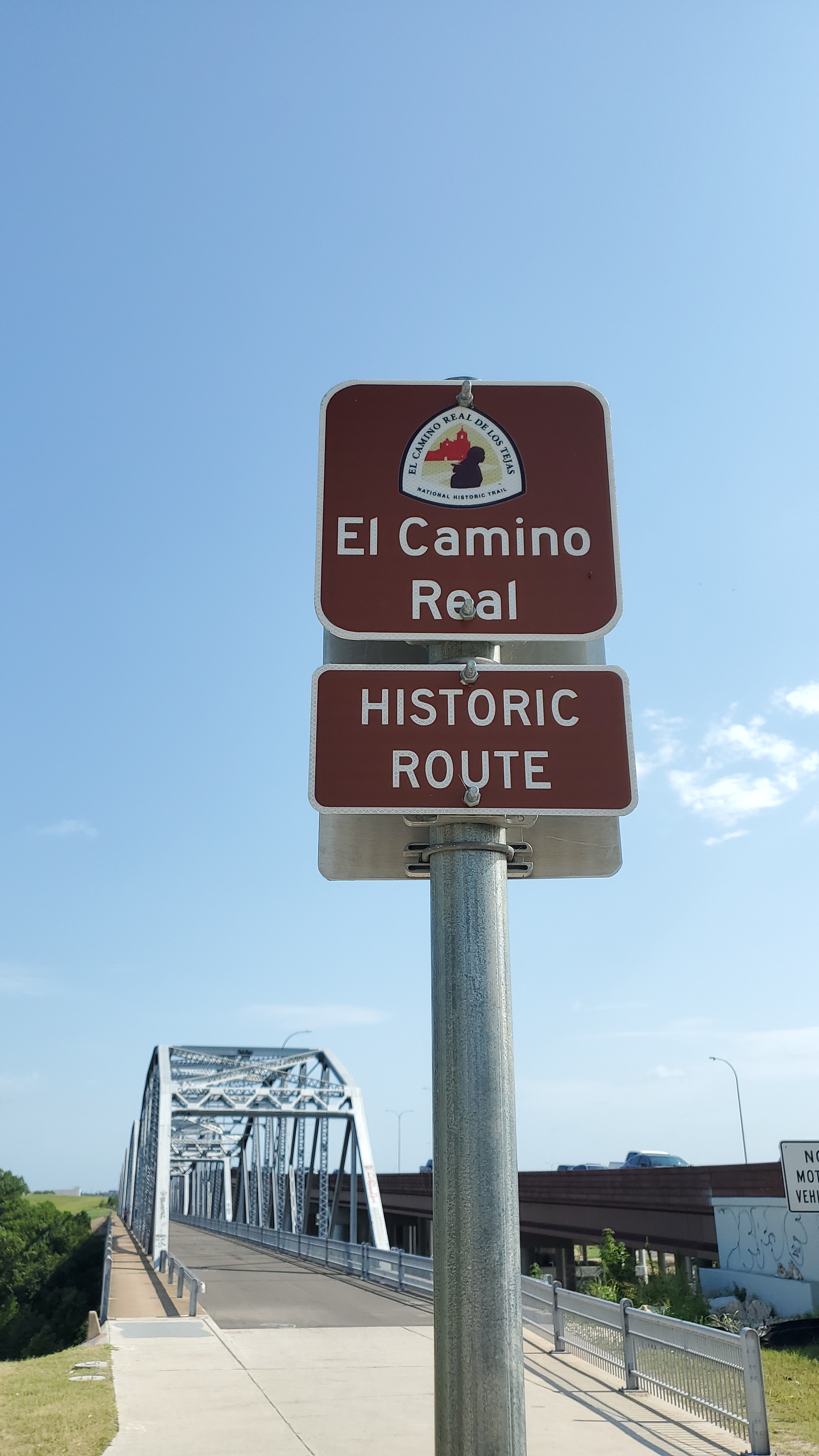
NPS signage for El Camino Real de los Tejas National Historic Trail. Montopolis Bridge is built atop a historic ford.

The historic trail ran from the capitol and central Viceroyalty of New Spain—present day Mexico City—winding through Saltillo, Monterrey, Laredo (on the modern Texas border), San Antonio, and Nacogdoches, before reaching the Louisiana border at the Sabine River. The river crossing was a ferry, in use since around 1795, as the Chabanan Ferry. James Taylor Gaines purchased the ferry in 1819, and it became known as the Gaines Ferry. Gaines sold the ferry in 1843 and at some point it began to be called Pendleton's Ferry. The ferry remained in service until being replaced by the Gaines-Pendleton Bridge in 1937.

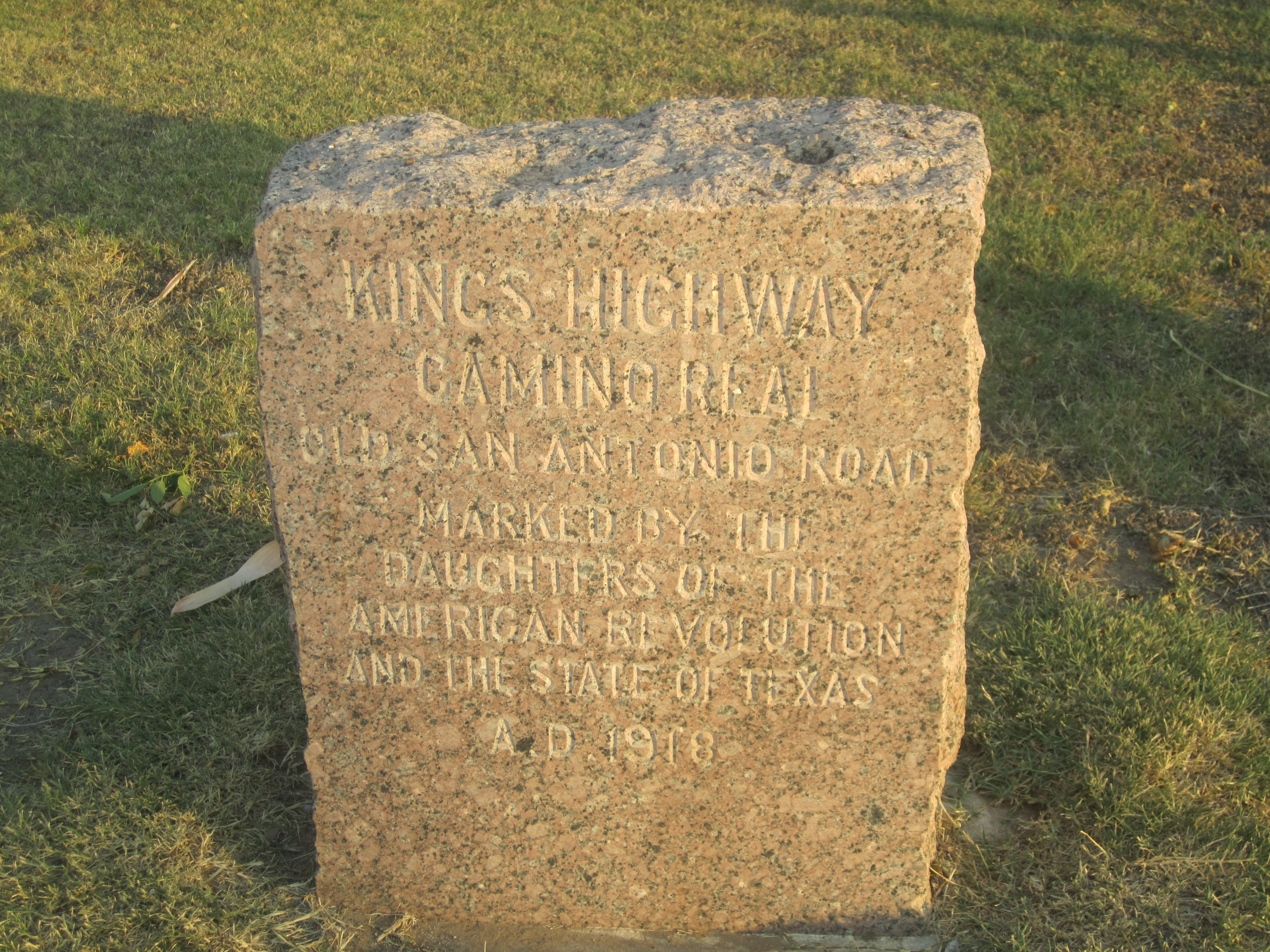
El Camino Real marker in Cotulla in La Salle County in South Texas

After crossing the river, the trail went through the Neutral Strip and Many, Louisiana, before ending at Natchitoches in modern Louisiana. The trail has a 2,500-mile length. For centuries, the Native Americans had used the trail routes for trading between the Great Plains and Chihuahuan Desert regions and essentially created the road. El Camino Real de Los Tejas was first followed and marked by Spanish explorers and missionaries in the 1700s. It was one of several named El Camino Real, or "Royal Road", that connected the Spanish possessions in North America with Mexico City.

== Preservation ==
Interest in the road revived in the early 20th century. In 1915, the Texas Legislature appropriated $5,000 to survey and mark the route, and professional surveyor V. N. Zivley was commissioned to make the study. A few years later, the Daughters of the American Revolution placed granite milestones every 5 miles along the route to mark it.

In October 2004, President George W. Bush signed into law the El Camino Real de los Tejas National Historic Trail Act that created the El Camino Real de los Tejas National Historic Trail. The National Park Service started planning for the El Camino Real de los Tejas National Historic Trail in 2006 with a comprehensive management plan.

The Texas Parks and Wildlife Department refurbished the former caretaker's cottage at Goliad State Park and Historic Site and opened it as the El Camino Real de los Tejas Visitors Center in 2018. The center provides interpretive displays of the cultural and historical significance of the El Camino Real de los Tejas.

== See also ==
- El Camino Real de Tierra Adentro – El Camino Real from Mexico to New Mexico
- El Camino Real (California) – the California Mission Trail
- Spanish missions in Texas
- Isle Brevelle
- Louis Juchereau de St. Denis
- Presidio San Antonio de Bexar
- Juan Bautista de Anza National Historic Trail
