= Montopolis, Austin, Texas =

Montopolis
- Neighborhood
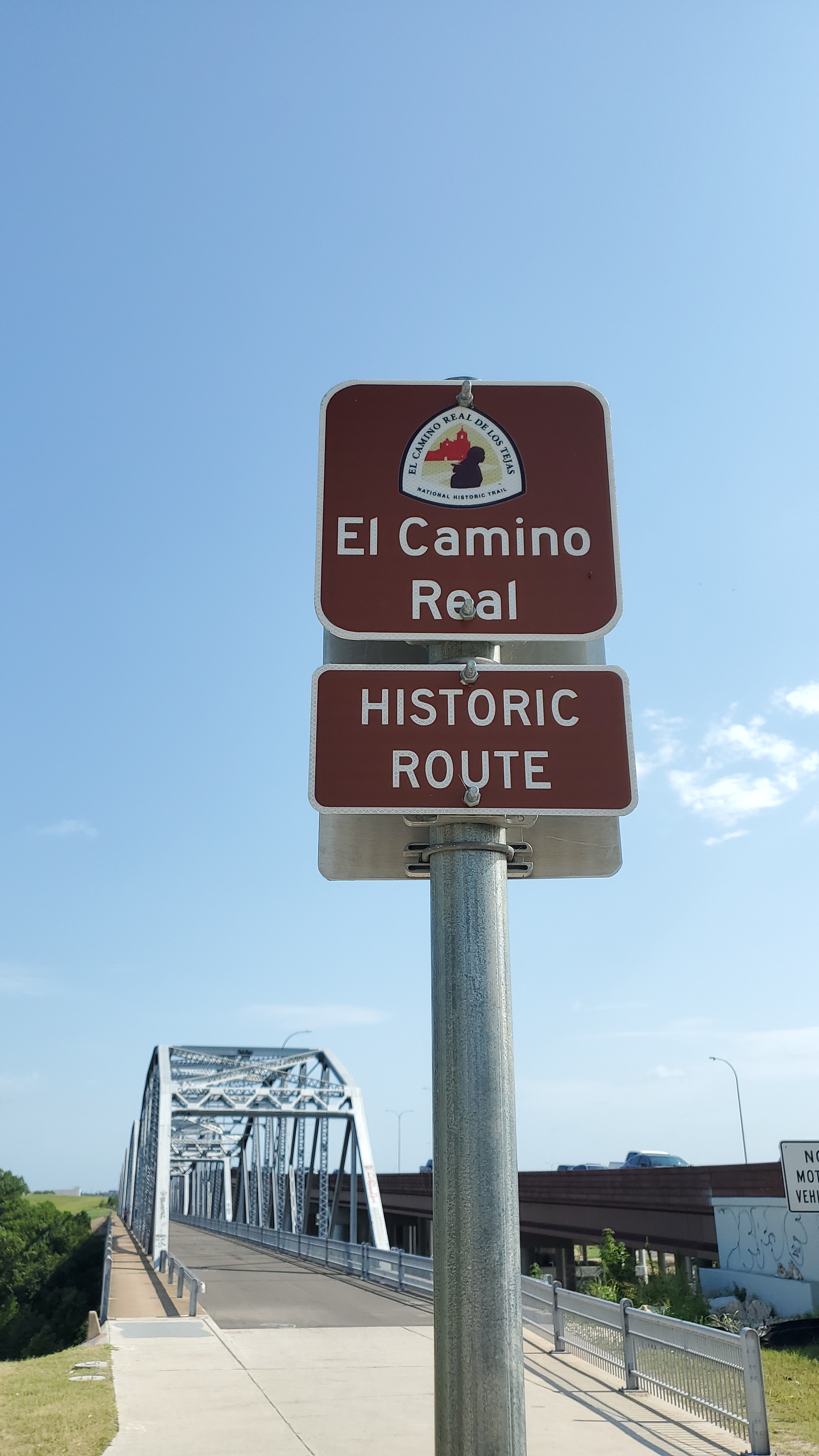
- NPS signage for El Camino Real de los Tejas National Historic Trail. Montopolis Bridge is built atop a historic ford.
- Neighborhood Boundaries
- Coordinates: 30°13′43″N 97°41′49″W
- Country: United States
- State: Texas
- City: Austin
- Time zone: UTC-6 (CST)
  - Summer (DST): UTC-5 (CDT)
- ZIP Codes: 78741
- Area codes: 512, 737

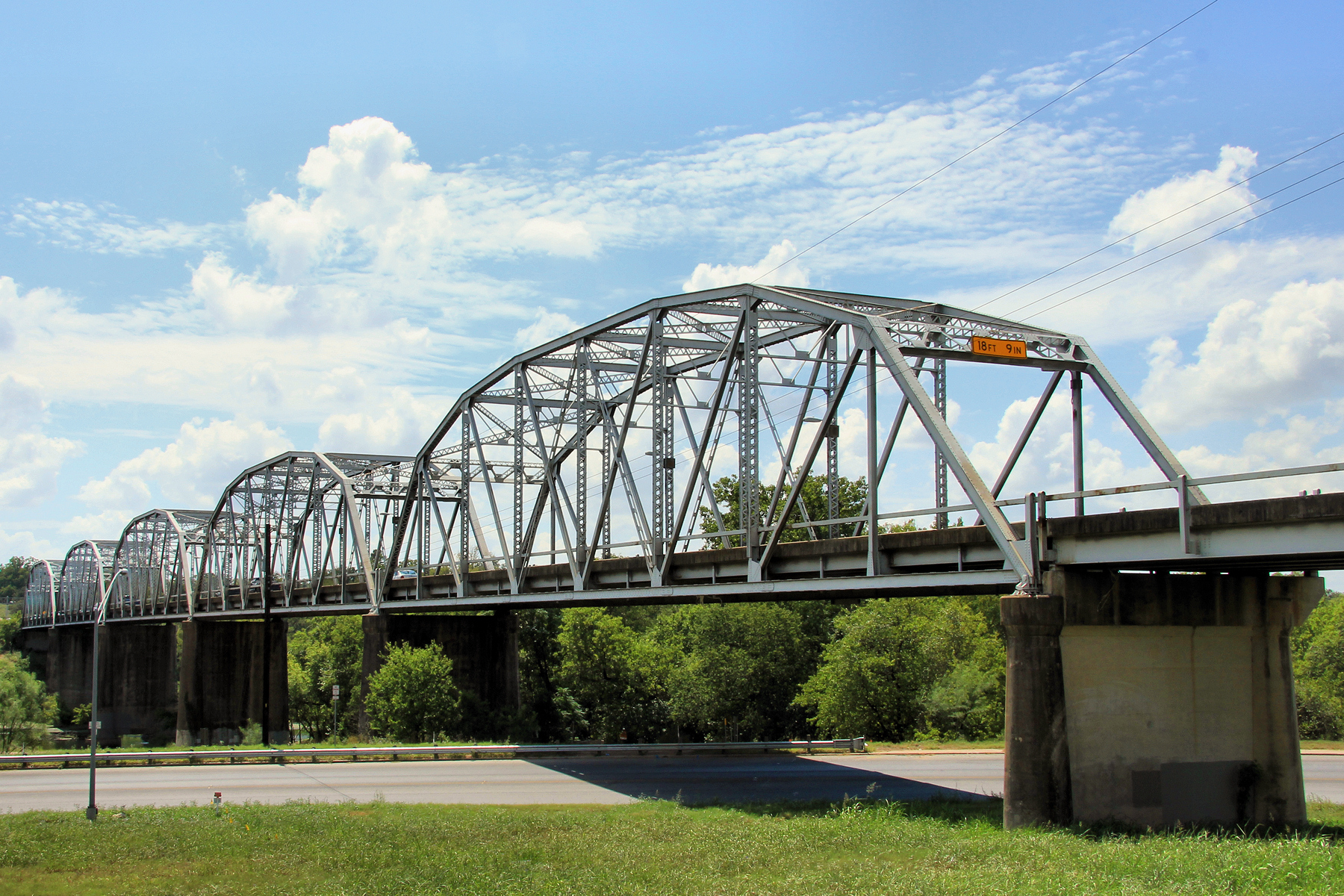
The Montopolis Bridge is now a bicycle and a pedestrian facility. It formerly carried the eastbound frontage road of U.S. Route 183 over the Colorado River prior to the 183 South Tollway project. It was added to the National Register of Historic Places in 1996.

The Original Townsite of Montopolis Historical Marker. Texas Historical Commission, marker number 22517, marker year 2019. Marker is located in Govalle Neighborhood Park, 5200 Bolm Rd, Austin, TX.

Travis County has had two locations named Montopolis. The first was during the Republic of Texas period north of the Colorado River. The second is today's Montopolis neighborhood in Austin, Texas south of the river. Located southeast of the city's urban core, today's neighborhood is in ZIP code 78741. Montopolis is bounded by Lady Bird Lake on the north, by Grove Street and the Pleasant Valley neighborhood on the west, to the south by Texas State Highway 71, and by U.S. Route 183 on the east. The southeast corner abuts Austin-Bergstrom International Airport. Montopolis is in City Council District 3.

== History ==
Travis County has had two locations named Montopolis that differ in their formation and location, sometimes causing confusion when the two are conflated.

The first was a planned townsite by Jesse Cornelius Tannehill during the Republic of Texas period north of the Colorado River, east and adjacent to what would become Austin, with a systematic design of building lots, farm lots, out lots, and streets laid out on a grid much like Edwin Waller's design of Austin;its planners aspired to make this site the capital of the nascent Republic of Texas.

The second was a community south of the Colorado River that began taking shape in Texas' Reconstruction era and into the early 20th century, evolving over several decades and ultimately becoming the neighborhood most Austinites recognize today as Montopolis.

The common thread joining old and new Montopolis is a historic river crossing become ferry then bridge of the same name with history that predates both.

=== Republic of Texas period ===
The founder of the Republic of Texas era townsite of Montopolis was Jesse Cornelius Tannehill (1797-1863). A recent though often repeated misconception is that Tannehill's Montopolis was founded in 1830; Tannehill's time in Texas is well documented showing this is not so. Tannehill and family came to Texas in 1828 first settling near Caney in Matagorda County. As a member of Stephen F. Austin's "Little Colony", they soon moved to Bastrop. In 1836 during the Texas war for independence, when Mexican forces threatened settlements along the Colorado, the Tannehills and other families fled Bastrop in wagons eastward towards Nacogdoches along the Old San Antonio Road. This evacuation was referred to as the Runaway Scrape. Following the war, the Tannehills lived in Huntsville and later in La Grange until 1839.

In 1839, Tannehill, his wife, Jane L. (Richardson) Tannehill (1803-1855), their children, and possibly several enslaved persons, moved to a headright of 4,428 acres on the Colorado River, from which 800 acres were surveyed for the town tract. A partnership deed between Tannehill and five others recorded July 2, 1839, established the location of a platted town on the left (north) bank of the Colorado river. Tannehill never owned any part of the Santiago del Valle grant south of the Colorado, nor was he in any way responsible for development or settlement south of the Colorado River, where the current community of Montopolis is located.

The townsite was named Montopolis ("mont" Latin for "mountain" and "polis" Greek for "city"). A recent interpretation of Montopolis is "city on a hill". In research for the Montopolis historical marker no primary or contemporary evidence for this was found. Several families settled in the community. James Smith (1790-1845) was likely the first settler in 1838. His 1841 home is preserved on Boggy Creek Farm.

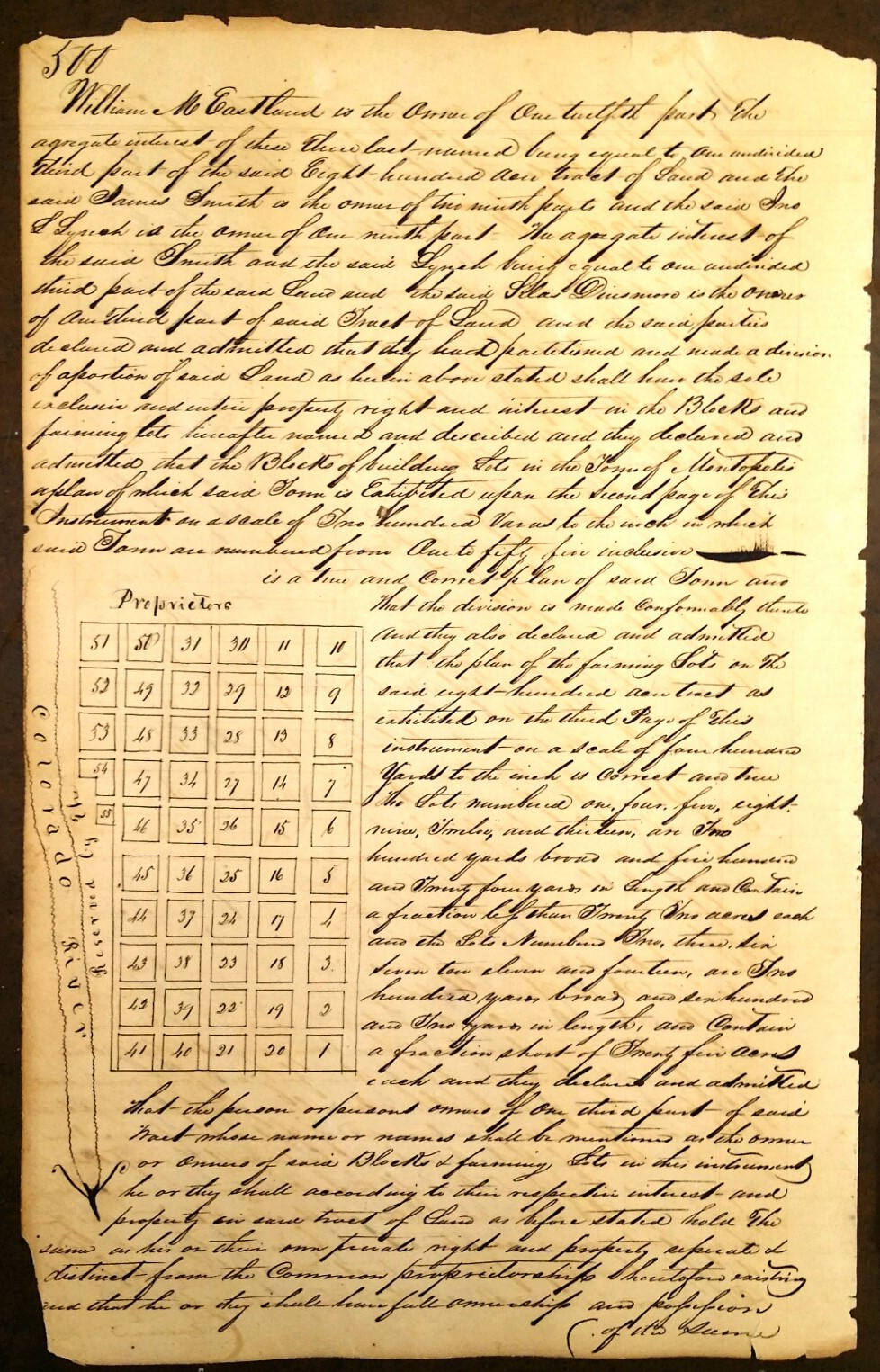
Page 500 from the original Bastrop County (Tex.), County Clerk's Office, plat of the town of Montopolis, Deed Book C. The deed records "...[the] Town of Montopolis, including the adjacent farming lands, containing in all eight hundred acres, it being a part of the Tannahill (sic) League ...". Notice drawing depicting Colorado River's eastern flow: as recorded, the entirety of the Montopolis town tract was contained within 800 acres of the Tannehill's headright league on the north side of the Colorado River. The deed was recorded July 2, 1839.

Tannehill began laying out Montopolis before Edward Burleson laid out nearby Waterloo, which was renamed Austin upon its selection as the republic of Texas' seat of government. There is evidence that Montopolis, as well as the town of Comanche, were also in the running for this honor. But the site selection commissioners chose the Waterloo location one mile from Spring Creek (Barton Springs) and the Montopolis venture died within two years of its conception. By 1841, the partnership that established Montopolis was dissolved, and the land was sold.

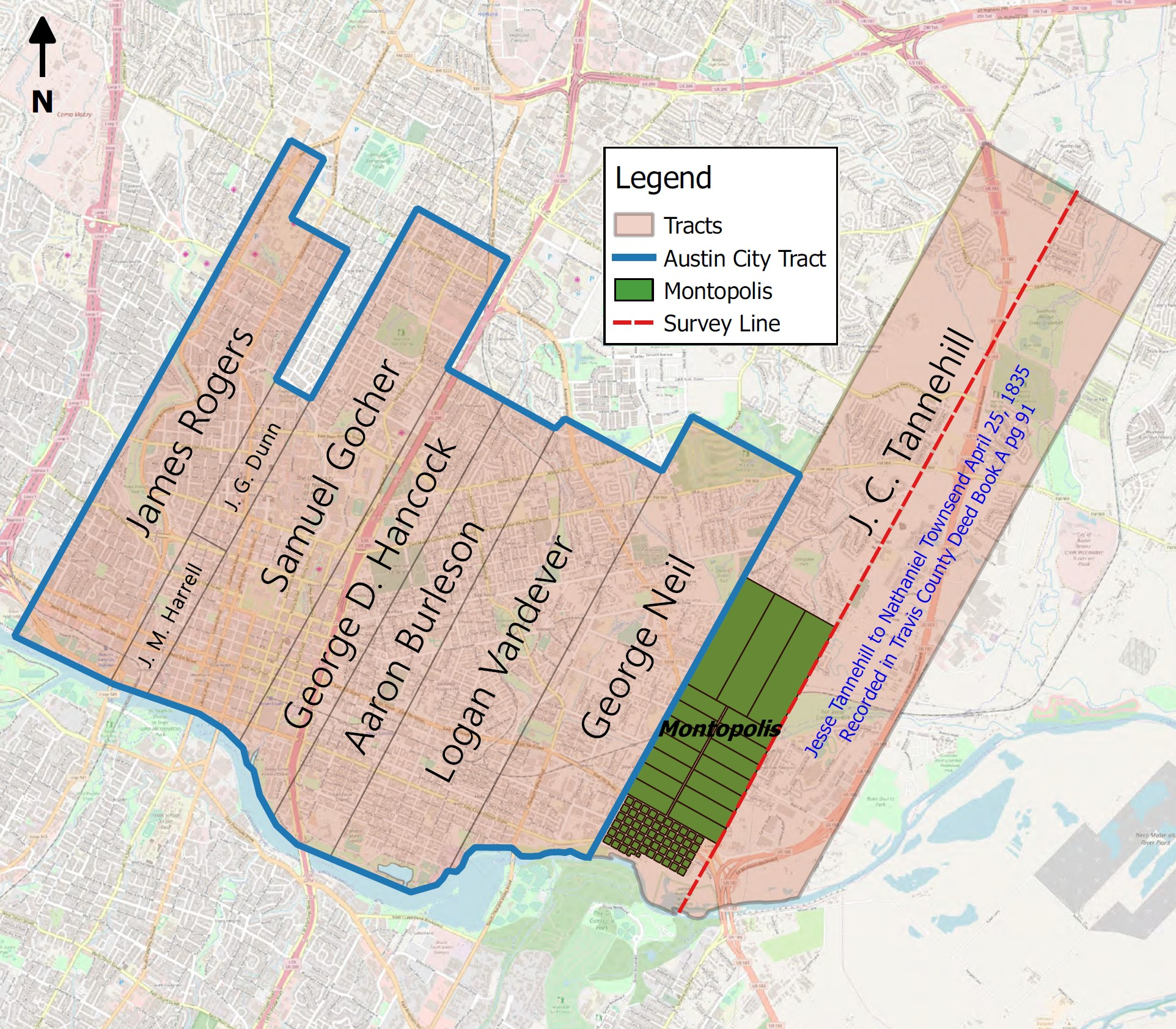
Jesse C. Tannehill's original townsite of Montopolis in terms of modern landscape. Deed interpretation by Lanny Ottosen, Travis County Historical Commission. GIS mapping by Griffin Price.

Although the partnership that formed Montopolis had ended, Montopolis as a sense of place persisted. O. Henry's The Door of Unrest, a fictional short story about a newspaper editor that lived in Montopolis refers to that community of Montopolis adjacent to Austin. William Sydney Porter, better known as O. Henry, lived in Austin from 1884 until 1898; his 1904 story is based on memories of that period. His house, now the O. Henry Museum, was originally located at 308 East 4th Street, a block off 5th Street, what historian Mary Starr Barkley called the "path of the pioneers": the original entry to today's Austin that ran through old Montopolis, adjacent to Austin on the east. Roads such as 5th Street illustrate how the Montopolis town tract aligned with that of Austin, and how the old Montopolis town tract didn't really "disappear", but rather became a part of today's Austin. Travis County Commissioner's Court minutes dated June 2, 1840 record a road from Austin to Bastrop: "...the road shall go down Pine Street [today's 5th Street] of the Town tract of Austin till you strike Broad Street of the tract of Montopolis & continuing Broad Street to Main Street in said Town of Montopolis then along Main Street [north] till it strikes the corner of farm lots no. Six and Seven then east with the line of said lots Six and Seven to the lower line of the [Montopolis] Town tract". Montopolis' Broad Street is now part of Austin's 5th street; Montopolis' Main Street today's Shady Lane; and today's Springdale Road was the north-south road forming the western boundary of Montopolis, running the length of the Tannehill league. Boggy Creek and Tannehill Branch were waterways part of the old Montopolis, now part of Austin. Historians such as Mary Starr Barkley from the 1960s clearly remembered the first Montopolis, and remnants of Montopolis place names persisted in the area of the original town tract into the 20th century, for example Montopolis Drive-In Theater and Howard's Montopolis Nursery, which had roots in the 19th century. References to Tannehill's "Montopolis town tract" are recorded in legal documents well into the 20th century further emphasizing the location of the original town tract is known with legal certainty.

The earliest map with the place name "Montopolis" south of the Colorado seems to be a USGS 1894 topographic map of Austin and Travis County referencing the "Montopolis Ferry", i.e. the ferry at the Montopolis river ford. But the ferry was named for the crossing, not a community. We know because that same year, 1894, a GLO map shows small communities east of Austin along the Colorado such as Del Valle, St. Elmo, Garfield, Hornsby, Dunlap, and Webberville but the community of Montopolis south of the river is absent. Neither does it appear on the survey of Travis County roads 1898-1902 while other communities with and without post offices do. A post office named Montopolis was later established in 1897 (discontinued in 1902) on the south bank of the ferry crossing. The Texas Almanac, first published in 1857, makes no mention of a Montopolis community until the 1907 issue when the 1900 US Census data was reported (1900 being the only census when the post office was in operation). Nor is Montopolis referenced in the Texas census of 1887-1888, while other communities in Travis such as Manchaca and Merrelltown, both with populations of only 50 persons, are.

While short lived, the Montopolis post office probably marks the start of the adoption of the name Montopolis for the community south of the river. When the City of Austin started annexation of that community in the early 1950s, memory of the original townsite began to fade.

=== From Reconstruction to today's neighborhood ===
After the Civil War, the area south of the Colorado became a freedmen's town, home to newly freed slaves who worked as sharecroppers. Burditt Prairie Cemetery is designated a Texas historic cemetery. The application for historic designation states Jesse F. Burditt, a plantation owner, provided the cemetery for burial of enslaved persons and their families and that "burials date from the mid-19th century to present".

A post office named Montopolis was established in 1897 with Jefferson D. Randolph as postmaster; the post office was discontinued April 10, 1902. The Montopolis population was 142 in 1900.

About 1891 a school for African American children was established in the Colorado School District as school No. 34. The building was destroyed in a storm in 1935. Land was then donated by the St. Edward's Baptist Church and a second school constructed from a building moved from Camp Swift. That school became part of the Austin Independent School District in 1952, then closed in 1962 as part of city-wide desegregation.

In the early 20th century, the neighborhood saw a large influx of Mexican immigrants. Between 1919 and 1922, San Jose Cemetery (Cemeterio San José) was established on the 700th block of Montopolis Drive as a Mexican American cemetery. The cemetery is designated a Texas historical cemetery. An additional section is located off of Hoeke Lane south of Ben White Boulevard.

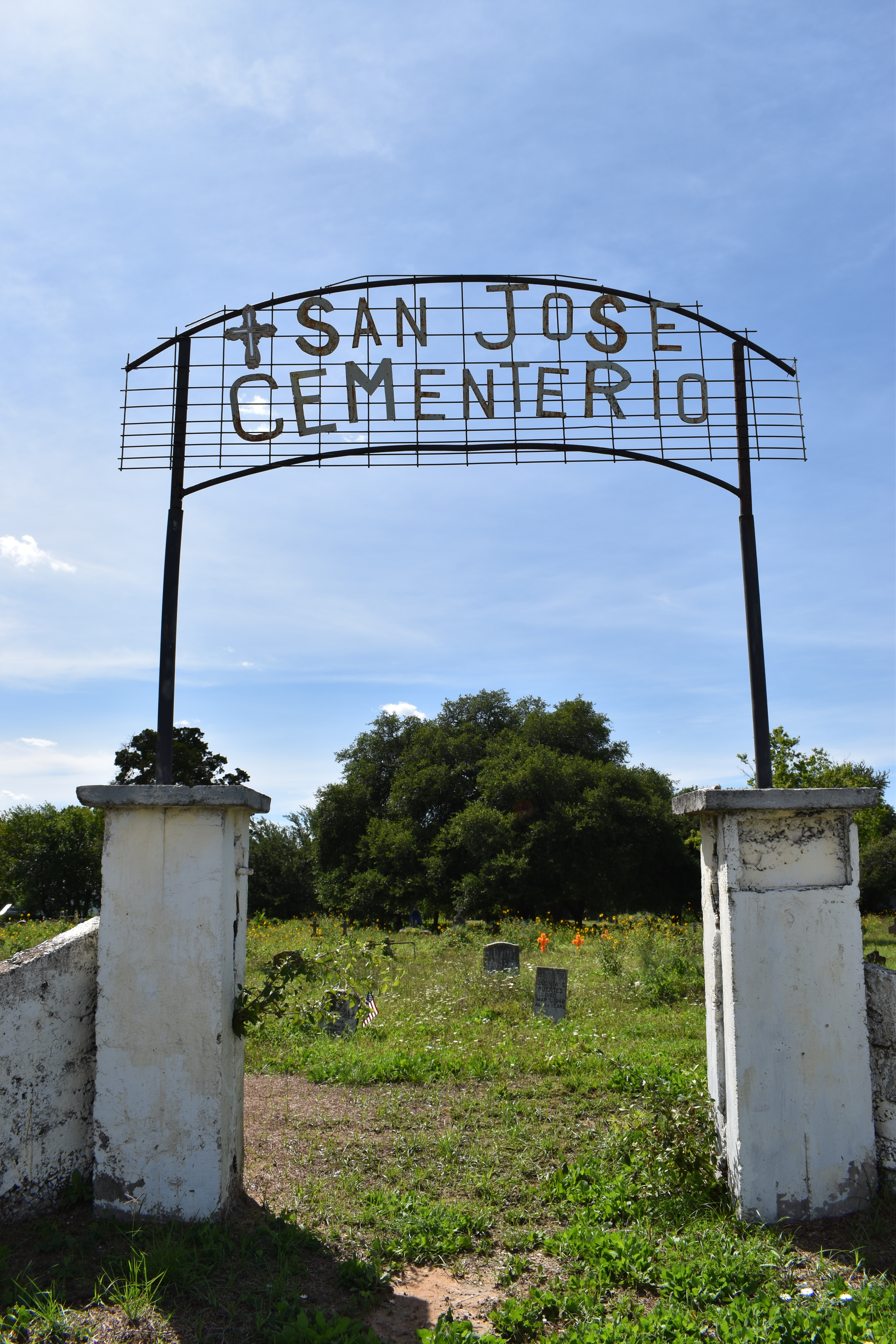
San Jose Cemetery

No road is more representative of today's Montopolis neighborhood than self-named Montopolis Drive and illustrates the neighborhood's changes in the 20th century. In 1950 residents of the community petitioned the Travis County Commissioners Court to have two roads, Miller Lane and Boothe Lane, both dating to the 19th century, renamed. These roads connected the Montopolis bridge to Burleson Road three miles to the southwest. The Commissioners Court approved the change giving birth to today's Montopolis Drive and further solidifying the identity of the evolving Montopolis neighborhood.

Despite the close proximity, Austin waited until 1952 to partially annex Montopolis, and it wasn't fully annexed until the 1970s. The working-class neighborhood has long been one of the poorest in Austin, with about two of every five residents living in poverty, according to the U.S. Census. Educational attainment also lags far behind the city average — in 2000, 53 percent of Montopolis residents more than 25 years old didn't have a high school diploma.

Given Austin's tremendous growth, the Montopolis neighborhood has experienced increased development in the 21st century. The community is located in a strategic location in Austin — adjacent to the Austin-Bergstrom International Airport and along two major highways: Texas State Highway 71 and U.S. Route 183. In 2005, the City of Austin was working on finalizing a Master Plan for the entire East Riverside Drive corridor, from the East Riverside-Oltorf Combined Planning Area to Montopolis to ABIA.

An increase in development has spurred fears of gentrification, but these fears may have prevented badly needed changes in Austin's development code – ones that would've allowed for far larger amounts of housing, including desperately needed multifamily developments – from occurring sooner. Although activists stopped a zoning change in early 2014 that would have allowed building condos instead of duplexes, the condos were approved, and Austin subsequently eliminated single-family-exclusive zoning in 2023. The median price for a Montopolis-area home rose above $500,000 for the first time during the post-pandemic housing boom in 2022.

=== Crossing of the Colorado ===
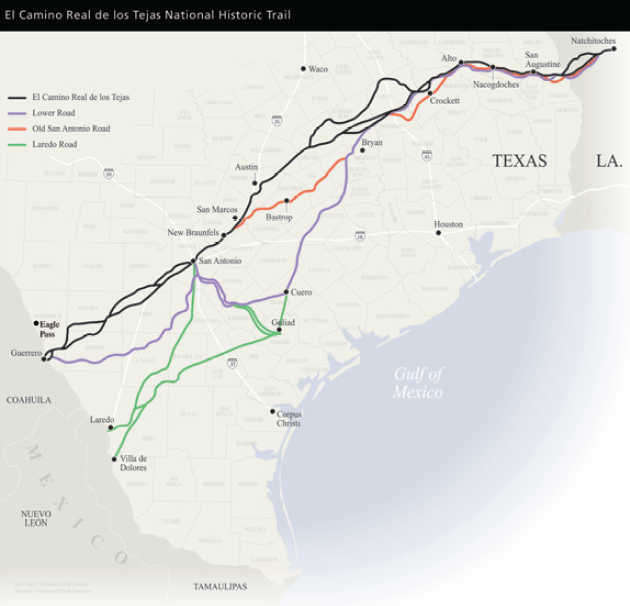
El Camino Real de los Tejas routes in Spanish Texas

The common thread joining old and new Montopolis is the historic river crossing become ferry then bridge of the same name. The name "Montopolis" as a river ford dates to the Republic of Texas era Montopolis townsite. It became a geographic place name in its own right, lasting long after the Republic of Texas era Montopolis town and partnership were dissolved, and before the community today adopted the name. The river crossing is the constant feature connecting the two Montopolis.

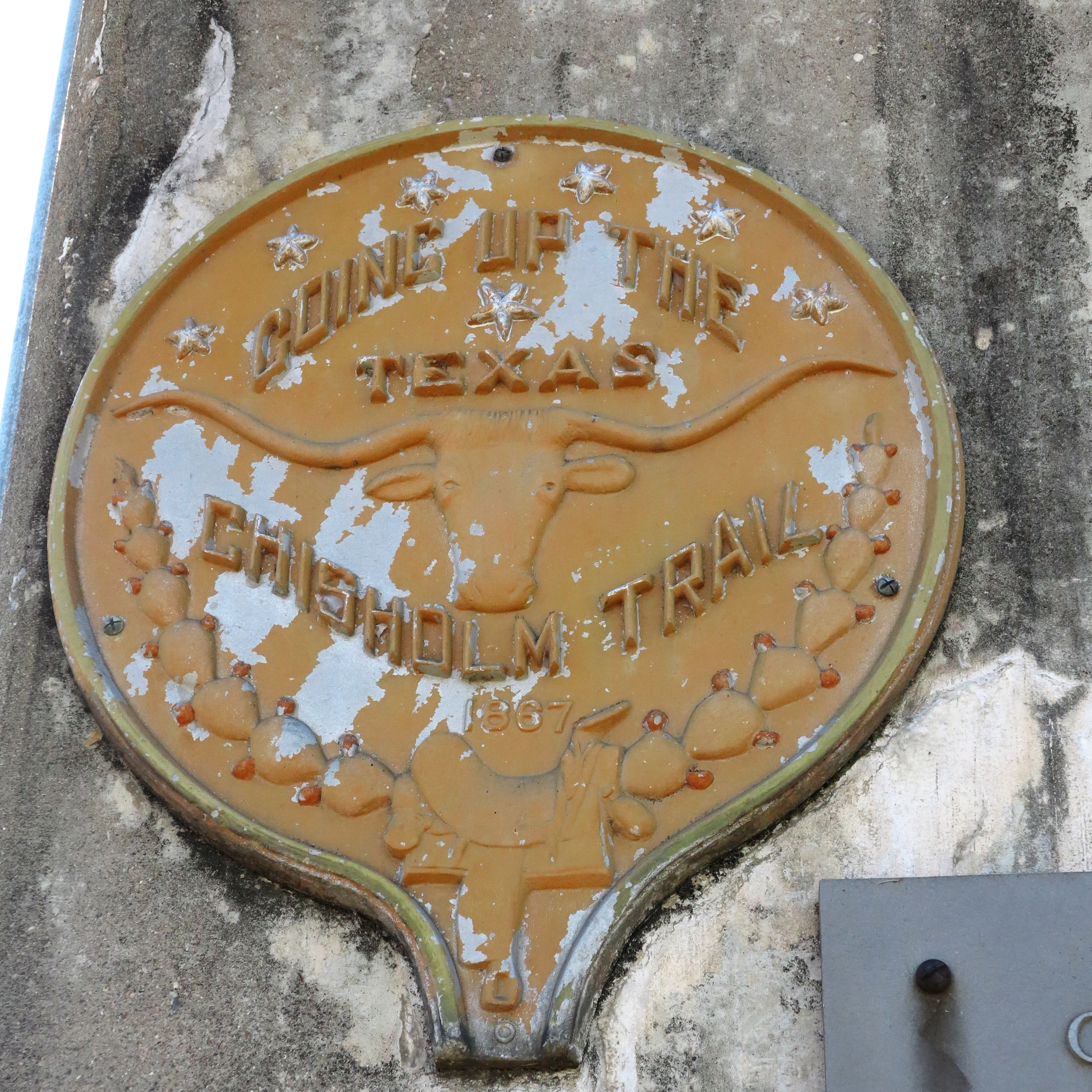
One of many medallions that were installed in Austin, including the Montopolis bridge, to mark the route and commemorate the Chisholm Trail. This photo is of the one on Longhorn Dam. The disposition of the Montopolis Bridge medallion is unknown pending completion of conversion of the old bridge to a pedestrian bridge.

During the Reconstruction era one of Texas' best economic resources was an abundance of longhorn cattle that could be sold in Kansas and other markets to the north. The Montopolis ford was one of the main crossings of the Colorado for the Chisholm Trail, in use from about 1867 to 1884. As historian Mary Starr Barkley wrote, "Cattle drives through Austin were a common sight, and the cattle bawled as they crossed at the two main crossings, Montopolis and Shoal Creek". In 1878 the Galveston Daily News echoed news from Austin: "TRAVIS COUNTY. Austin Statesman, March 30: On Sunday last three droves of cattle, of 2500 to 399 head each, crossed the river at Montopolis ford, and in the past week about 15,000 head have crossed that point."

But the crossing is older than either of the two Montopolis. Indigenous people lived in and traveled through the area for thousands of years prior to the arrival of Europeans. Historic El Camino Real de los Tejas, established by the Spanish along Native American trails, skirted the eastern edge of today's Montopolis neighborhood fording the Colorado east of today's Montopolis Bridge.

The Montopolis Bridge that marks the old Montopolis ford is on the National Register of Historic Places. The bridge was decommissioned in 2018 to be repurposed as a hike and bike pedestrian traffic bridge that will include historical interpretive signage. In 2020 Travis County Historical Commission met with members of the National Park Service (NPS) from Santa Fe, NM who were in Austin working with El Camino Real de los Tejas National Historic Trail Association to document and commemorate the trail's route through Travis County. Working in conjunction with the Central Texas Regional Mobility Authority, signage is now part of the Montopolis pedestrian bridge recognizing the crossing as part of El Camino Real de los Tejas.

== Education ==
Montopolis is served by both the Austin Independent School District and the Del Valle Independent School District as well. AISD schools zoned for Montopolis are as follows:* Allison Elementary School

- Martin Middle School
- Eastside Memorial High School at the Johnston Campus

Del Valle schools zoned for Montopolis include:

- Baty Elementary
- Gilbert Elementary School
- Hillcrest Elementary School
- Hornsby-Dunlap Elementary School
- Dailey Middle School
- Ojeda Middle School
- Del Valle High School

== Demographics ==
As of 2019 the population of Montopolis was 10,700 across an area of 2.217 square miles. The population density per square miles is 4,825 people per square mile, just above Austin's citywide average of 3,893 people per square mile. The racial breakdown is Hispanic or Latino 67.1%, White 19.7%, Black 7.7%, Two or more races 3.2%, Asian 1.4%, American Indian 0.6%, Native Hawaiian and Other Pacific Islander 0.3%, Some other race .04%. Median household income in 2019 in Montopolis was $45,360, below Austin's $75,413. Median age for males is 32.7 years and 31.9 for females (compared with 33.8 years and 34.2 respectively citywide). The average estimated value of detached houses (46.7% of all units) was $470,732, lower than Austin's average of $481,494.
