= Montopolis Bridge =

Historic bridge in Austin, Texas

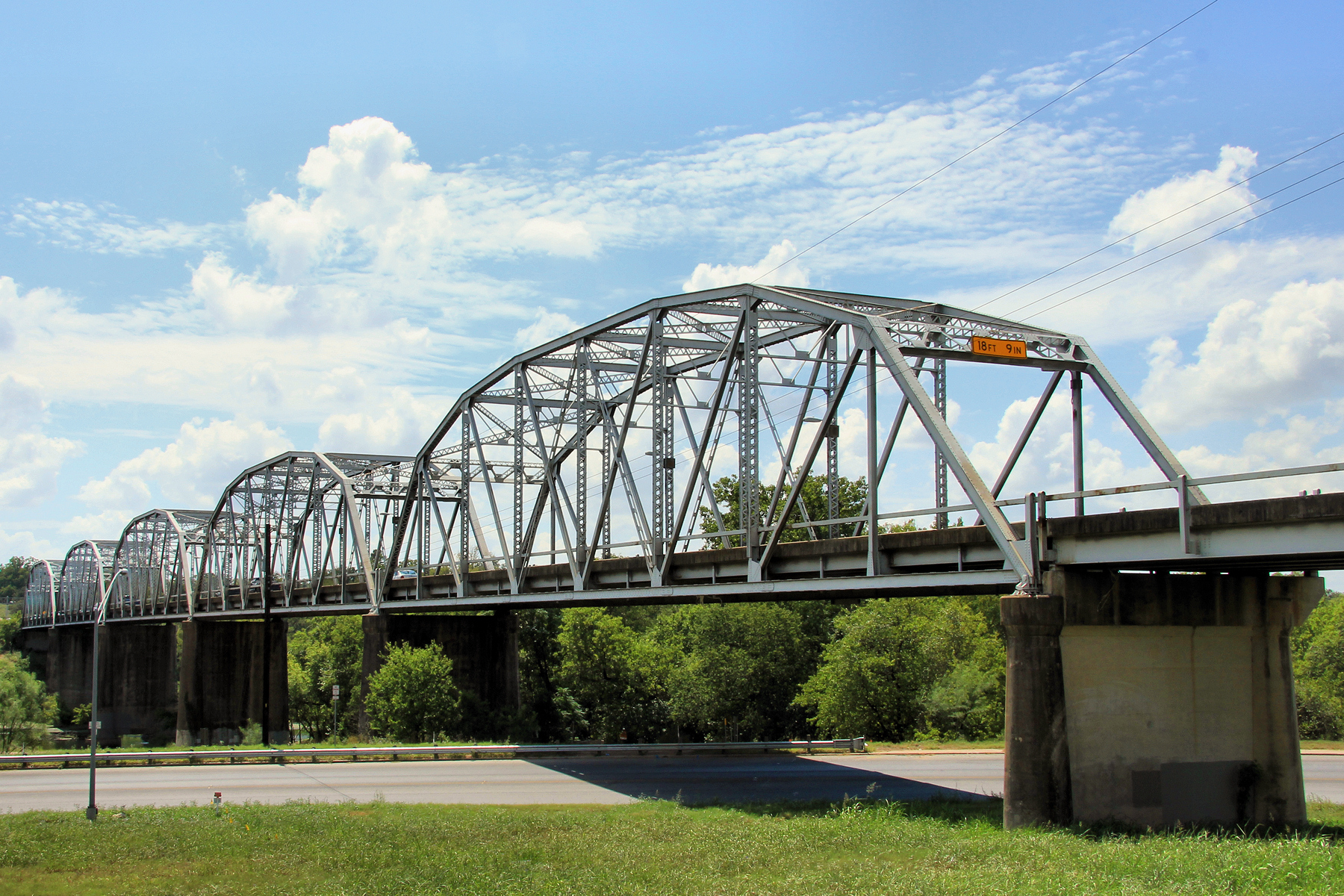
- Viewed from the north in 2013
- Coordinates: 30°14′44″N 97°41′29″W
- Carries: Bicycle and pedestrian crossing (formerly US 183 frontage road)
- Crosses: Colorado River
- Locale: Austin, Texas
- Owner: State of Texas
- ID number: 142270026501034

Characteristics
- Design: Parker through truss
- Material: Steel
- Total length: 1,221 feet (372 m)
- Width: 24 feet (7.3 m)
- Longest span: 200 feet (61 m)
- No. of spans: 9
- Clearance above: 19 feet (5.8 m)
- No. of lanes: 2

History
- Designer: Texas Highway Department
- Constructed by: Vincennes Steel Corporation
- Construction start: February 15, 1937
- Construction cost: $232,000
- Opened: February 11, 1938
- Montopolis Bridge
- U.S. National Register of Historic Places
- Location within Texas Location within the United States
- Coordinates: 30°14′44″N 97°41′29″W
- Area: less than 1 acre (0.40 ha)
- MPS: Historic Bridges of Texas MPS
- NRHP reference No.: 96001118
- Added to NRHP: October 10, 1996

The Montopolis Bridge is a historic Parker through truss bridge in Austin, Texas, United States. It is located in the Montopolis neighborhood where a bicycle and pedestrian walkway crosses the Colorado River in southeastern Travis County. The bridge is part of the El Camino Real de los Tejas National Historic Trail.

== History ==
On June 15, 1935, the city of Austin suffered a devastating flood along the Colorado River. The original Montopolis bridge, built by Travis County in the late 1880s, was one of five bridges washed away by the flood. The Texas Highway Department designed the current bridge and requested federal emergency relief funds from the Bureau of Public Roads to rebuild it. Work on the bridge began on February 15, 1937. The bridge was completed on February 11, 1938, by Vincennes Steel Corporation under contract to the Highway Department at a cost of nearly $232,000 (equivalent to $5,310,000 in 2025).

It was added to the National Register of Historic Places on October 10, 1996.

The Montopolis Bridge remained in use until 2018 and, as one of the principal routes to the Austin-Bergstrom International Airport from Downtown Austin, was fairly busy. The southbound frontage of U.S. 183, Airport Boulevard and East 7th Street all merge at the north side of the bridge. In 2006, 29,200 vehicles crossed on average each day. The bridge was decommissioned for vehicular traffic on October 8, 2018, and was subsequently converted to a bicycle and pedestrian bridge as part of the Bergstrom Expressway Project.

The bridge is part of the El Camino Real de los Tejas National Historic Trail.

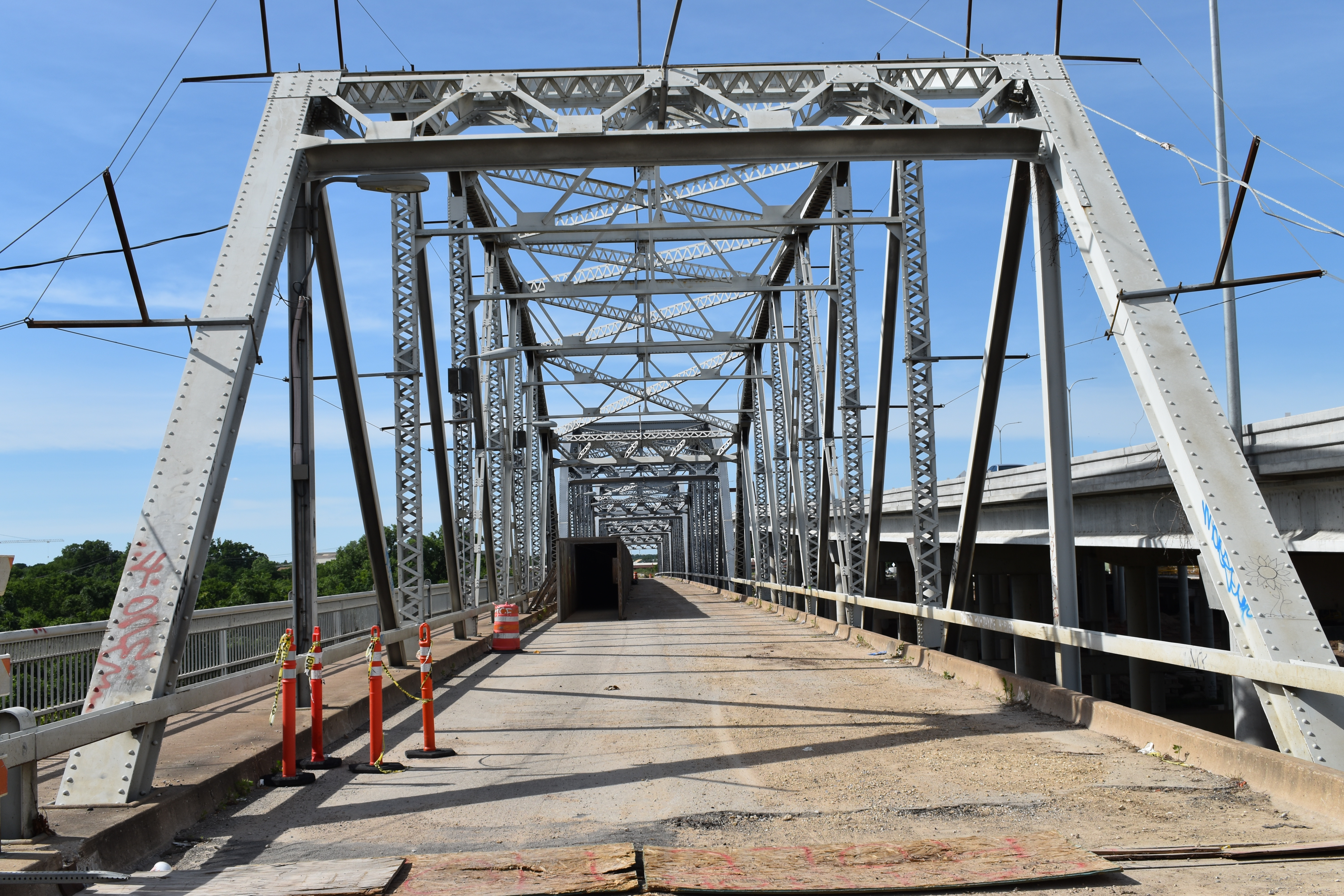
Deck during conversion to pedestrian use in 2020

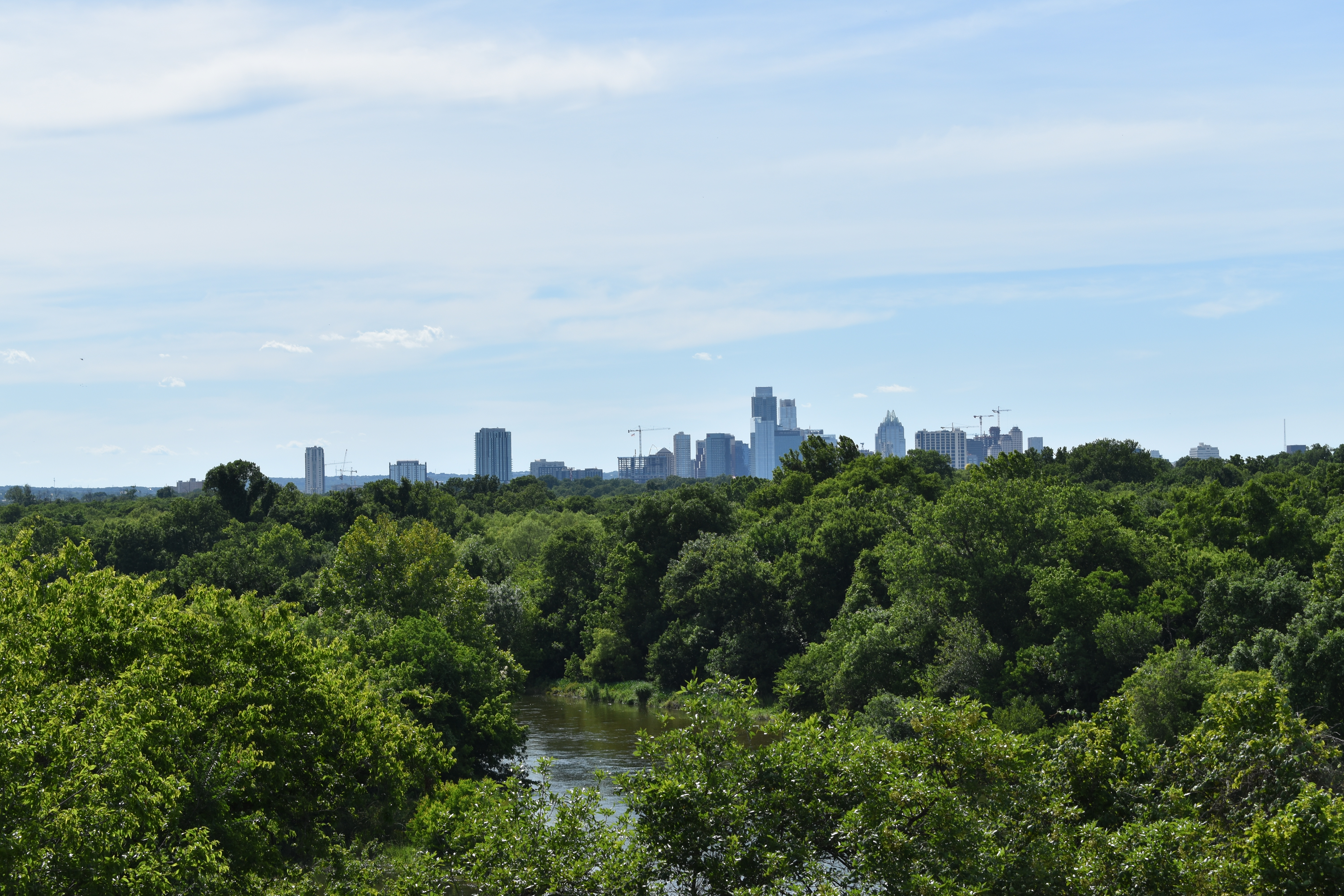
Austin skyline from the bridge

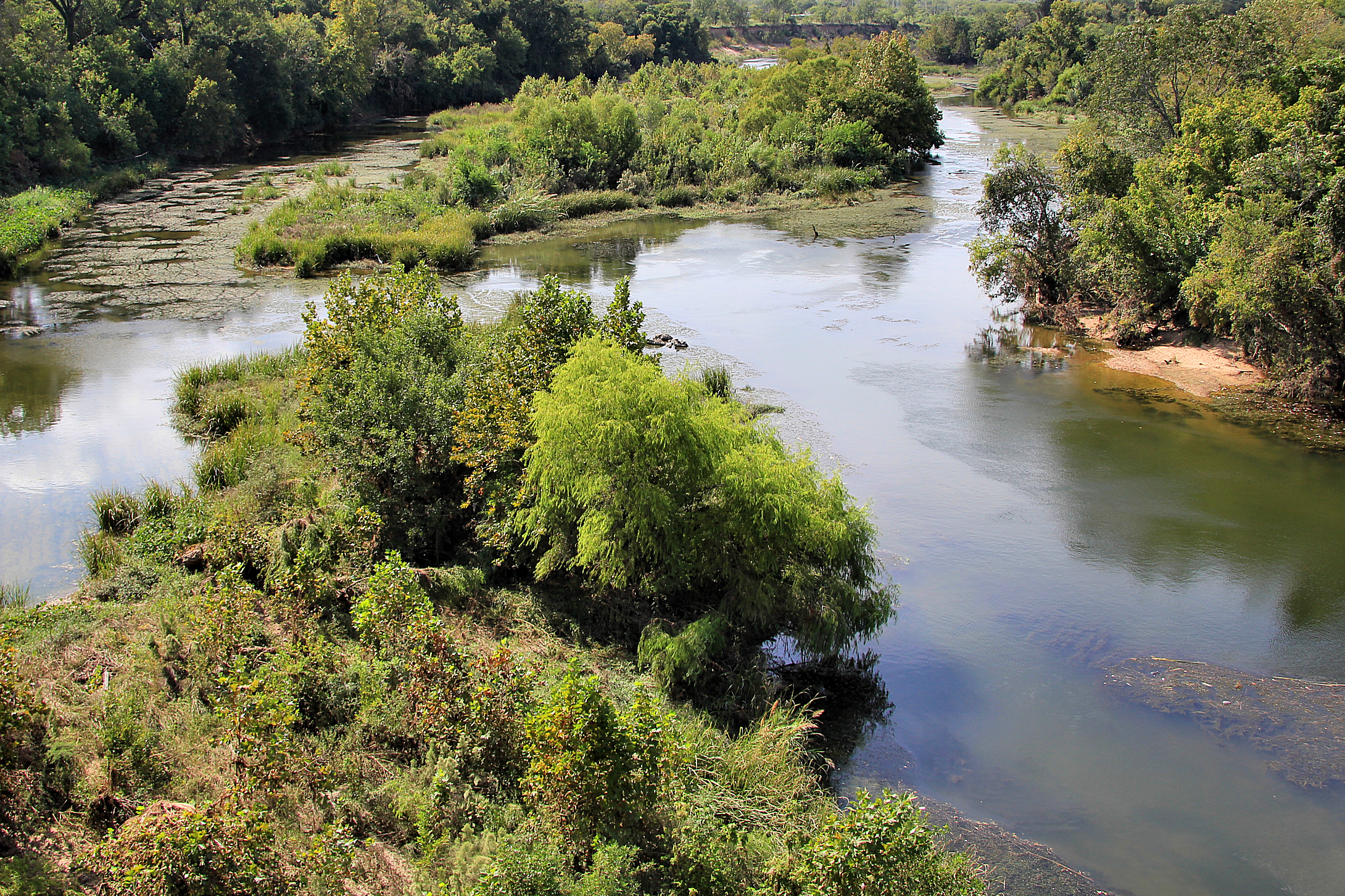
The Colorado River in the Montopolis area

== See also ==
- List of crossings of the Colorado River
- National Register of Historic Places listings in Travis County, Texas
- List of bridges on the National Register of Historic Places in Texas
