= Baby Head, Texas =

Unincorporated community in Texas, US

- Unincorporated community
- Location within Texas Location within the United States
- Coordinates: 30°53′18″N 98°39′11″W
- Country: United States
- State: Texas
- County: Llano

Area
  - Water: 20 sq mi (52 km^{2})
- Elevation: 1,375 ft (419 m)

Population (as of 1990 per Handbook of Texas)
  - Total: 20
- Time zone: UTC-6 (Central (CST))
  - Summer (DST): UTC-5 (CDT)
- GNIS feature ID: 1351376

Baby Head or Babyhead is an unincorporated community in Llano County, Texas, United States. As of 1990, there was still a population of 20.

The townsite and associated Baby Head Cemetery lie along Texas State Highway 16, approximately nine miles north of Llano. Babyhead Mountain lies about 4000 feet to the west and rises roughly 250 feet above the site.

According to the book 1001 Texas Place Names, the name "Baby Head" was given to the town following an attack by Indians where the head of a baby belonging to one of the settlers was placed atop a pole. Besides the mountain, a nearby creek also bears the name.
