= James Love (Kentucky politician) =

American politician (1795–1874)

Member of the U.S. House of Representatives from Kentucky's 9th district
- In office March 4, 1833 – March 3, 1835
- Preceded by: Charles A. Wickliffe
- Succeeded by: John White

Member of the Kentucky House of Representatives
- In office 1819–1831

Personal details
- Born: May 12, 1795 Nelson County, Kentucky, U.S.
- Died: June 12, 1874 (aged 79) Galveston, Texas, U.S.
- Resting place: Episcopal Cemetery, Galveston, Texas, U.S.
- Party: Anti-Jacksonian
- Profession: Politician, lawyer

Military service
- Allegiance: United States
- Battles/wars: War of 1812; American Civil War

James Love (May 12, 1795 – June 12, 1874) was a U.S. representative from Kentucky.

Born in Nelson County, Kentucky, Love attended the common schools in Bardstown, Kentucky. He volunteered at the age of 18 and served during the War of 1812. He studied law, and was admitted to the bar and commenced practice in Barbourville, Kentucky. He served as member of the state house of representatives 1819–1831.

Love was elected as an Anti-Jacksonian to the Twenty-third Congress (March 4, 1833 – March 3, 1835). He declined a renomination to the Twenty-fourth Congress. He moved to Texas in 1837 and settled in Galveston. He represented Galveston in the convention, which framed the constitution of 1846, and was the first judge of the Galveston district. He resigned to become clerk of the United States court and served until the opening of the Civil War. After war was declared, he enlisted and served for two years with the Terry Rangers.

After the war, he was elected first judge of the Galveston and Harris County Criminal Court, but was removed by the military commander. He died in Galveston, Texas, June 12, 1874. He was interred in the Episcopal Cemetery.

U.S. House of Representatives
Preceded by Charles A. Wickliffe	Member of the U.S. House of Representatives from Kentucky's 9th congressional district 1833 – 1835	Succeeded by John White
