= Freedman's Cemetery (Texas) =

Cemetery in Dallas, Texas

- Interactive map of Freedman's Cemetery

Details
- Established: 1861; 165 years ago
- Location: Dallas, Texas, U.S.
- Coordinates: 32°48′12″N 96°47′38″W
- Find a Grave: Freedman's Cemetery

The Freedman's Cemetery, or Freemen's Cemetery, was established in 1861 as a burial ground for the early African American population in Dallas, Texas. It was an active burial site from 1869 until 1907, supported by the historic Black settlement of Freeman's Town founded by formerly enslaved people (the town was located roughly 1 mile (1.6 km) from Deep Ellum, Dallas).

The cemetery was lost sometime after the building of the North Central Expressway in the mid-1940s, which cut through the space. Local authorities had removed the grave stones and covered the cemetery with a lawn to form a city park. In the summer of 1990, the Freedman's Cemetery burial ground was rediscovered when the park was renovated; some 800 marked graves were found and an estimated 1,200 unmarked graves.

The Freedman's Cemetery Memorial was created in 1990, to honor those that were buried and provide community healing. The memorial is part of a cemetery tour in Uptown, Dallas, and sits near the Emanu-El Cemetery, the Calvary Cemetery, and the Greenwood Cemetery. It has designation as a Dallas Landmark since 1992, and is part of the State Historic Marker program in Texas since 1993.

== See also ==
- Freedmen's Cemetery (disambiguation)
- List of cemeteries in Texas
