= Baby Head Cemetery =

Cemetery in Llano County, Texas

Coordinates: 30°53′15″N 98°39′22″W

- Interactive map of Baby Head Cemetery

Details
- Location: Llano, Texas

Baby Head Cemetery is a cemetery located on Highway 16, approximately 9 miles north of the city of Llano, Texas. Designated a Recorded Texas Historic Landmark in 1991, Marker 9432. The sign reads as follows:

According to local oral tradition, the name Babyhead was given to the mountain in this area in the 1850s when a small child was killed by Native Americans in the United States, and its remains left on the mountain. A local creek also carried the name, and a pioneer community founded in the 1870s became known as Baby Head. The oldest documented grave here is that of another child, Jodie May McKneely, who died on New Year's Day 1884. The cemetery is the last physical reminder of the Baby Head community, which once had numerous farms, homes and businesses.

== Mystery ==
Several versions of the story have been told, and the timeline is different in these newer tales. Llano historian Goldie S. Conley did the research for the state marker now located at the cemetery. She also wrote a book, Cherokee Creek Country. Her research put the date in the 1850s, as stated on the marker. Another book which gives this earlier date is Canyon of Eagles by C.L. Yarbrough. According to The Handbook of Texas, c. 1952, Babyhead Mountain was named about 1850.

Others put the date at about 1873, including John E. Conner, who was born in 1883 and grew up in the area hearing the stories from those who had been there. Llano historian Alline Elliot also puts the date in 1873, citing stories from her late husband, Sidney. He had worked for a man who, as a teen, actually went with the party to search for the baby. Alline even gives a names to the individuals involved, stating the baby's name was Mary Elizabeth, and the father Bill Buster.
