= Oak Grove-Freedman's Cemetery =

Historic cemetery in North Carolina, United States

Coordinates: 35.6699°N 80.4695°W

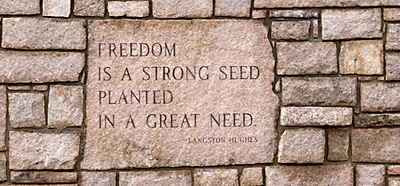
A portion of the Oak Grove-Freedman's Cemetery Memorial.

The Oak Grove-Freedman's Cemetery is a historic cemetery located at the corner of Liberty Street and North Church Street in downtown Salisbury, North Carolina. The cemetery has served as a burial ground for African Americans since it was deeded to the city in 1770.
