= Old Georgetown Cemetery =

Cemetery in Williamson County, Texas, US

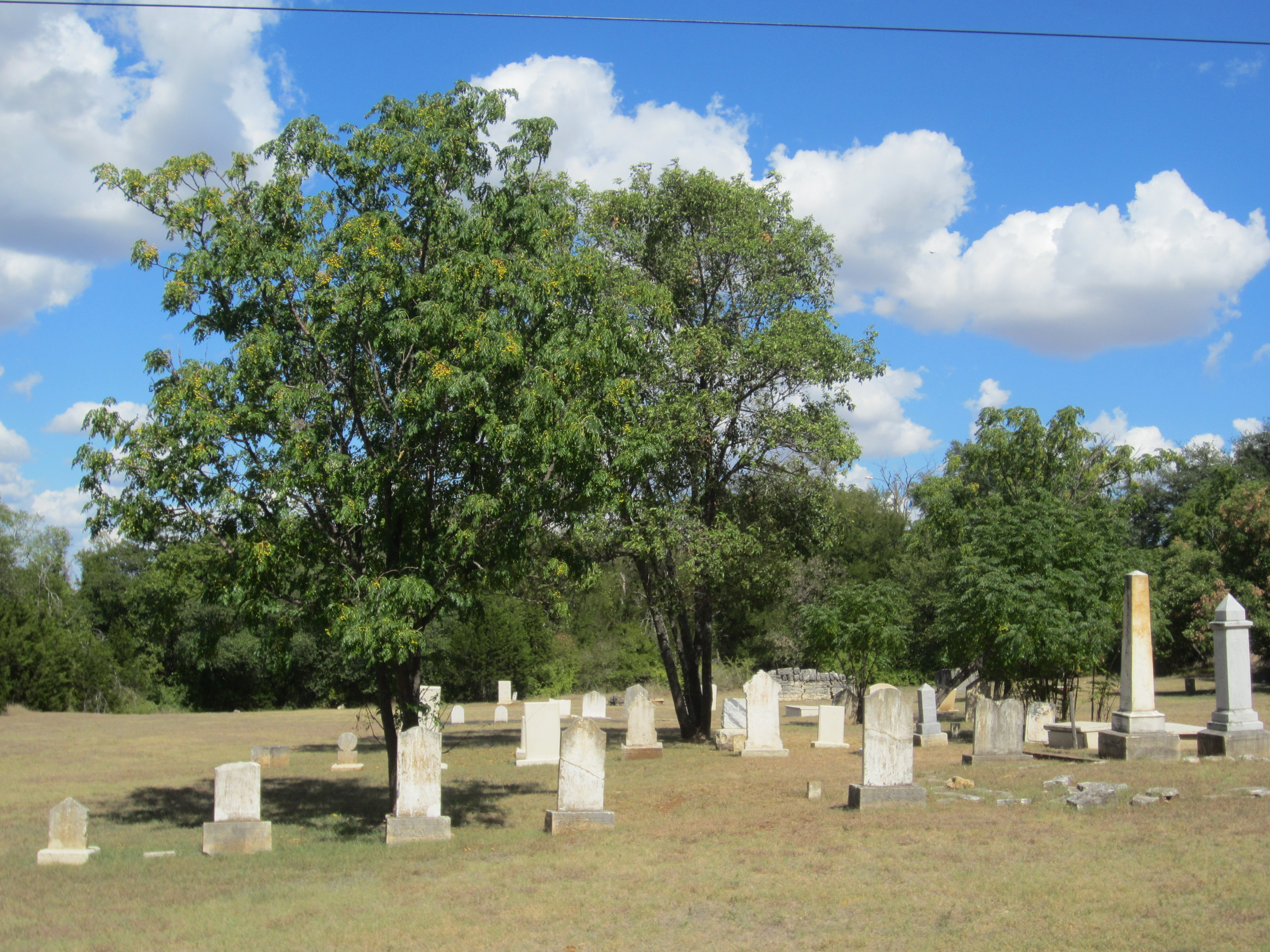
- Part of the cemetery in 2018

Details
- Location: Georgetown, Texas
- Country: United States
- Coordinates: 30.6421°N 97.6818°W
- Find a Grave: Old Georgetown Cemetery

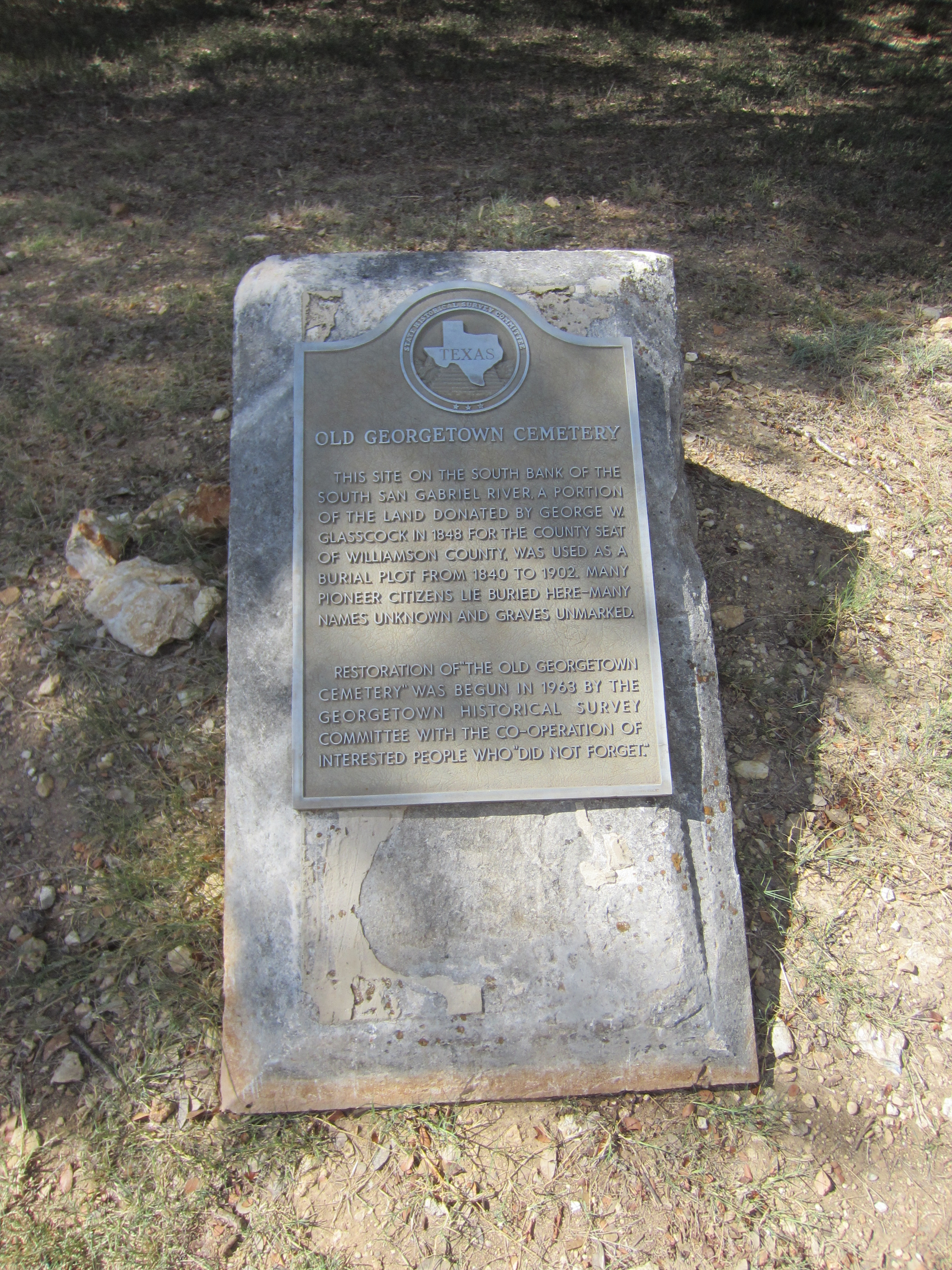
Plaque for the cemetery, 2018

Old Georgetown Cemetery, also known as San Gabriel Cemetery and Blue Hole Cemetery, is a cemetery in Georgetown, Texas, United States. The Georgetown Historical Survey Committee led efforts to restore the cemetery in 1968.

== See also ==
- IOOF Cemetery (Georgetown, Texas)
