= Eastlawn Memorial Gardens =

Cemetery in Texas, USA

Coordinates: 33.565°N 101.809°W

- Interactive map of Eastlawn Memorial Gardens

Details
- Location: Lubbock, Texas
- No. of graves: Over 60,000

Eastlawn Memorial Gardens (a.k.a. City of Lubbock Cemetery) is a cemetery in Lubbock, Texas housing over 60,000 graves.

== Notable burials ==
- George Andrew Davis Jr., Korean War Congressional Medal of Honor Recipient
- Buddy Holly, musician
- Virgil Johnson, singer
- Bobby Layne, Hall of Fame Professional football player
- Mac Davis, Country music singer, songwriter
