= San Jose Cemetery =

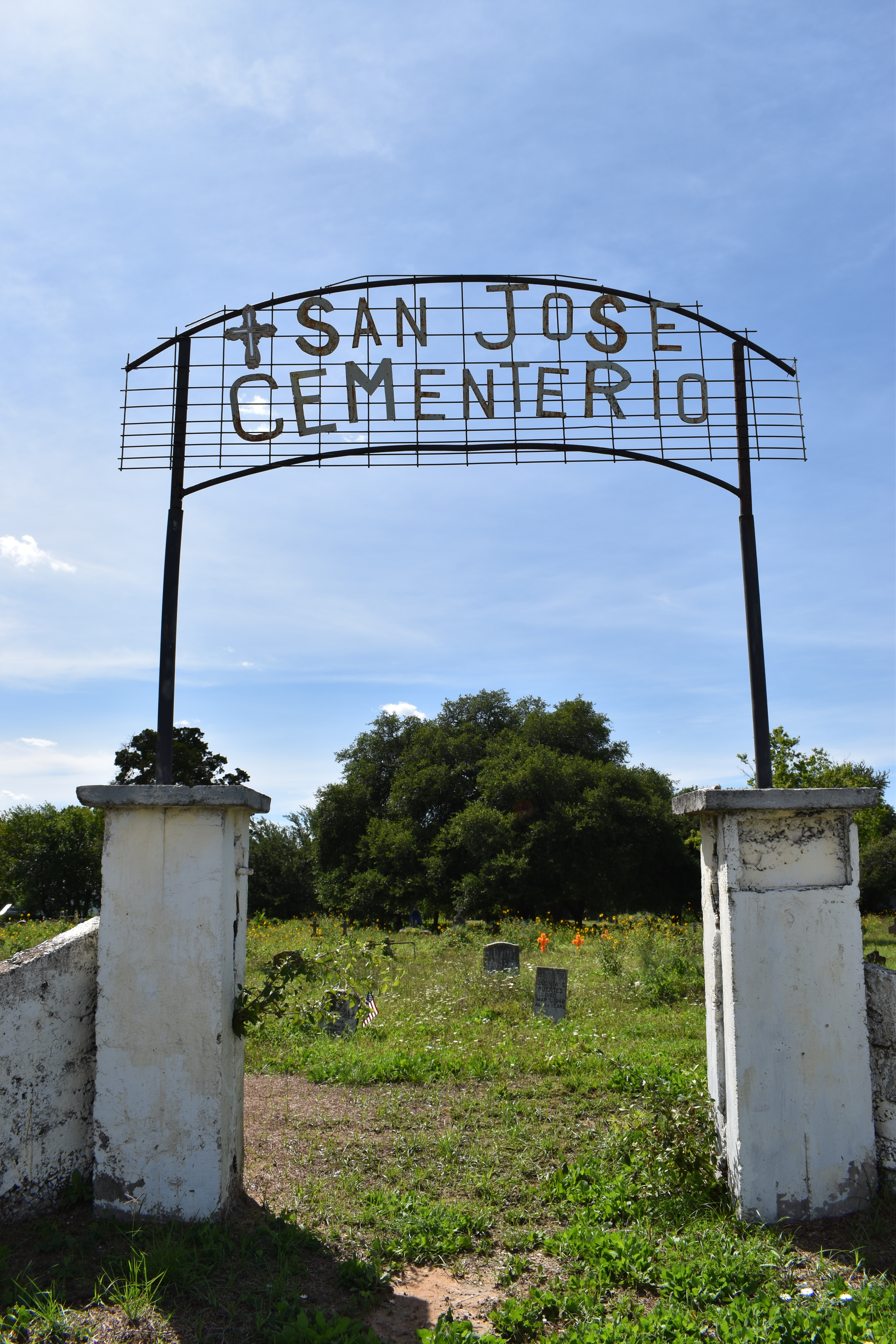
- Entrance to San Jose I
- Interactive map of San Jose Cemetery

Details
- Established: 1919–1922
- Location: 705 Montopolis Drive and 8101 Posten Lane; Austin, Travis County, Texas U.S.
- Country: United States
- Coordinates: 30°14′14″N 97°41′48″W
- Owned by: City of Austin
- Find a Grave: San Jose Cemetery

San José Cemetery, is a Texas state designated historic landmark, established in 1919 as a burial site for Austin's Mexican, Mexican-American and Indigenous community. It is located in the heart of the Montopolis neighborhood southeast of central Austin, Travis County, Texas, United States. It is also referred to as Cemeterio San José.

There is second related San Jose Cemetery nearby named San Jose II Cemetery and was formerly known as the Montopolis Cemetery, The New San Jose Cemetery and San Jose #2.

== History ==
Existing documentation indicates that San Jose Cemetery was established in 1919 by the Union Fraternal Mexicana. At that time, the Montopolis area was lying outside of the Austin city limits and would remain so until the 1950s. The area was largely rural, without essential services, and suffered from high poverty rates and crime. Moreover, segregation era policies prevented integrated cemeteries for people of color, specifically Indigenous/Latinx/Hispanic and Black communities. The cemetery markers provide a rare source of documentation for the early phase of Mexican-American and Indigenous urbanization in the Austin area. The name of the cemetery is believed to have been derived from an early burial of a child named Jose Hernandez. His grave and those of other children are located in a section close to the original entrance to the cemetery located off of Ponca Street.

In the center of the cemetery is a short fence shaped like a five pointed star. In the center of that star stands a marble pillar, where Padre Jose Hernandez and four of his children were buried together. They died on July 26, 1924 when their car was hit by a train as Padre Jose was driving his family to speak at a religious tent revival. (Source: Hernandez Family descendent from Padre Jose's younger son Ricardo)

An adjacent parcel of land was eventually acquired from an existing east Austin organization at the time, the Del Valle Burial Association and that allowed the cemetery to expand to its present size. This additional section filled up rapidly and many graves sites were unmarked. This condition is believed to have led to newer graves being placed over previous unmarked graves. No formal record exists of burials and lists known to have existed are believed to have been lost in a fire. The Union Fraternal Mexicana managed the cemetery from 1919 to the late 1930s. Between 1930 and 1950, it was managed jointly by the Union y Beneficencia Committee and the Panteon de San Jose. The Panteon de San Jose had sole charge of the cemetery until the late 1950s. It is not yet known what became of this organization.

Due to the fact that the San Jose Cemeteries have never been associated with a church or organization nor under the care of the City of Austin, and since that time, care and maintenance of the cemetery has been left up to the community. As a result, this has led to inconsistent care and neglect. In the process, a substantial number of metal markers designating burial placements and stone markers have been damaged or lost due to the use of riding lawnmowers, for instance. Nevertheless, most headstones remain intact. The cemetery still retains its most unique features. Many of East Austin's early community leaders are buried there.

In February 1948, a second parcel of land (4.5 acres), was officially acquired and deeded over to the trustees for the Montopolis Cemetery with intention to continue burials as the cemetery on Montopolis Drive began to reach capacity, almost 3 miles away. The common address for San Jose II Cemetery is 8101 Posten Lane, although there is no official nor obvious entrance. The original entrance however is designated by a sign on Hoeke Lane, about one block south of Posten Ln.

Overlapping with burials at the San Jose Cemetery on Montopolis Dr., the first known burials at the San Jose II Cemetery began in 1947, about year before the cemetery was official. At that time it was named the Montopolis Cemetery. Burials resumed in earnest until the early 1950s and suddenly stopped. A survey of the cemetery shows that the next burial occurred about ten years later, in 1962. Existing records show that the first group of trustees apparently died leaving no line of succession, with the exception of the daughter of one of the trustees. In July 1983, the cemetery was deeded over to a second group of three trustees for $10. After the 1962 burial, two more interments occurred in the late 1980s 1980's with no further burials taking place. For reasons unknown the cemetery became neglected, abandoned, mostly forgotten and by the late 1990s was very difficult to access due to explosive growth of invasive trees, weeds, poison ivy and green briar. More recently, the cemetery began to be threatened by surrounding development.

In 2022 a community-based non-profit, the San Jose Montopolis Cemetery Association, was formed to begin organizing, educating, researching, and helping the community consistently maintain both cemeteries with the goal of eventually facilitating the resumption of burials at San Jose Cemetery II, fulfilling its original mission.
