= IOOF Cemetery (Georgetown, Texas) =

Cemetery in Williamson County, Texas, US

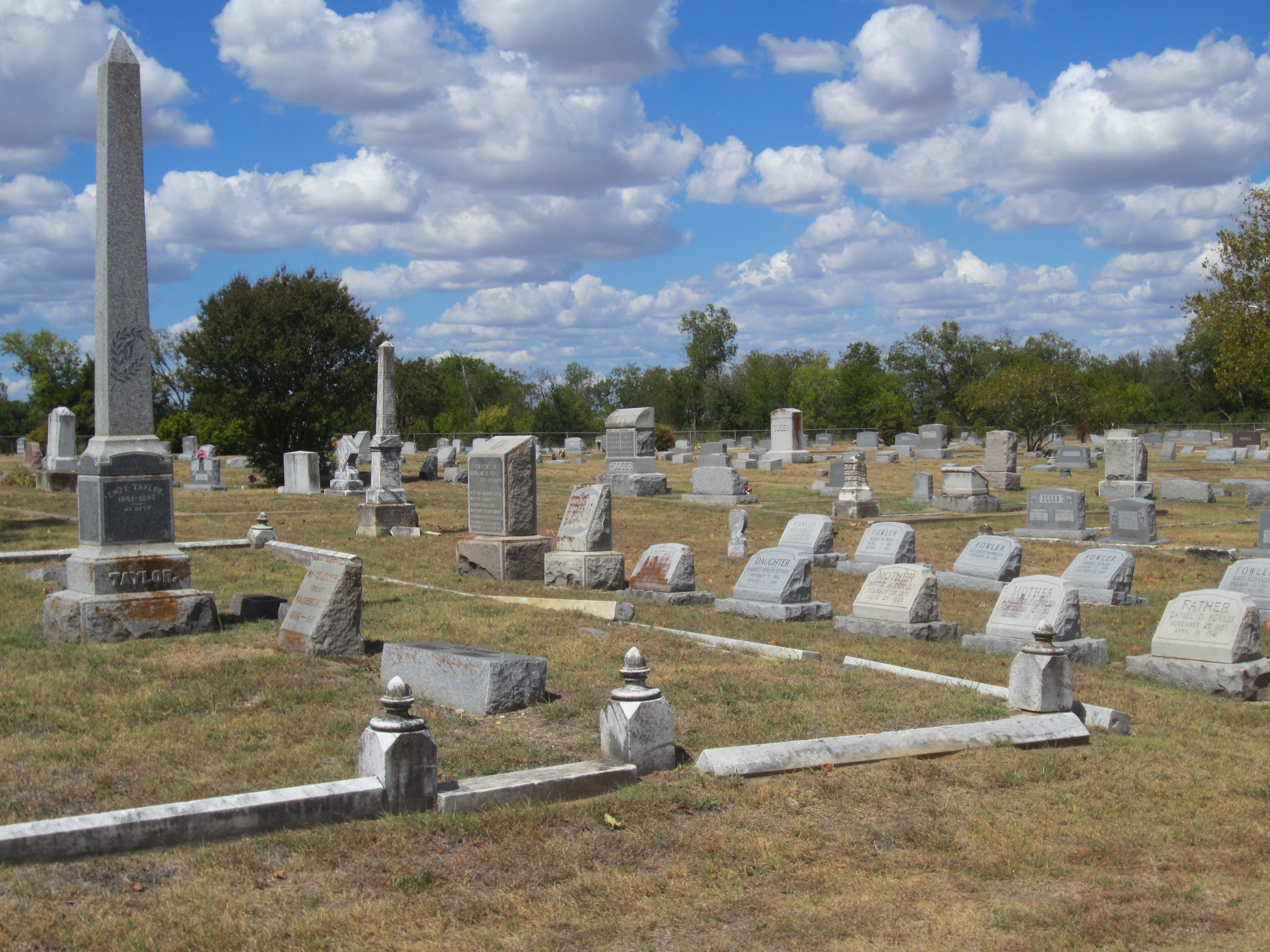
- Part of the cemetery in 2018

Details
- Location: Georgetown, Williamson County, Texas
- Country: United States
- Coordinates: 30.64°N 97.66°W
- No. of graves: >6,000
- Find a Grave: IOOF Cemetery

IOOF Cemetery, or International Order of Odd Fellows Cemetery, is a cemetery located at 1117 E. 7th St., near Southwestern University, in Georgetown, Texas, United States.

== See also ==
- Old Georgetown Cemetery
