= Whittaker Memorial Cemetery =

Cemetery in Texas

Coordinates: 32°54′09″N 94°15′50″W

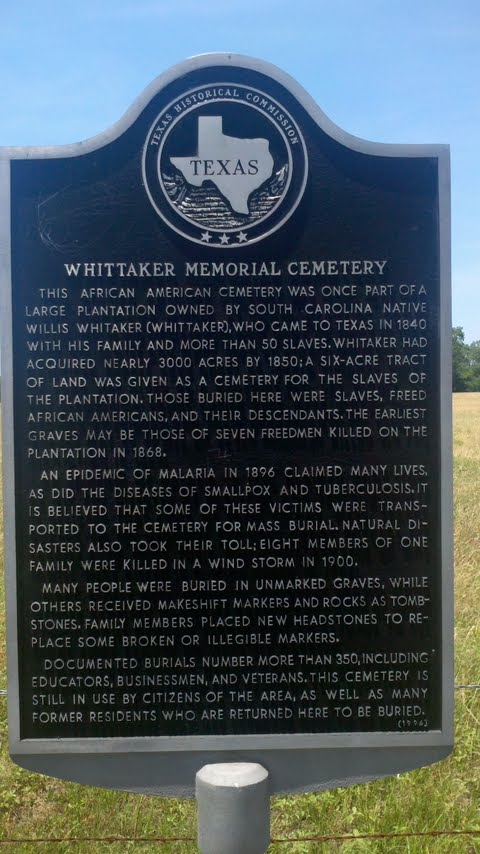
- Historic marker outside the cemetery.
- Interactive map of Whittaker Memorial Cemetery

Details
- Location: Kildare, Texas
- No. of graves: Over 350

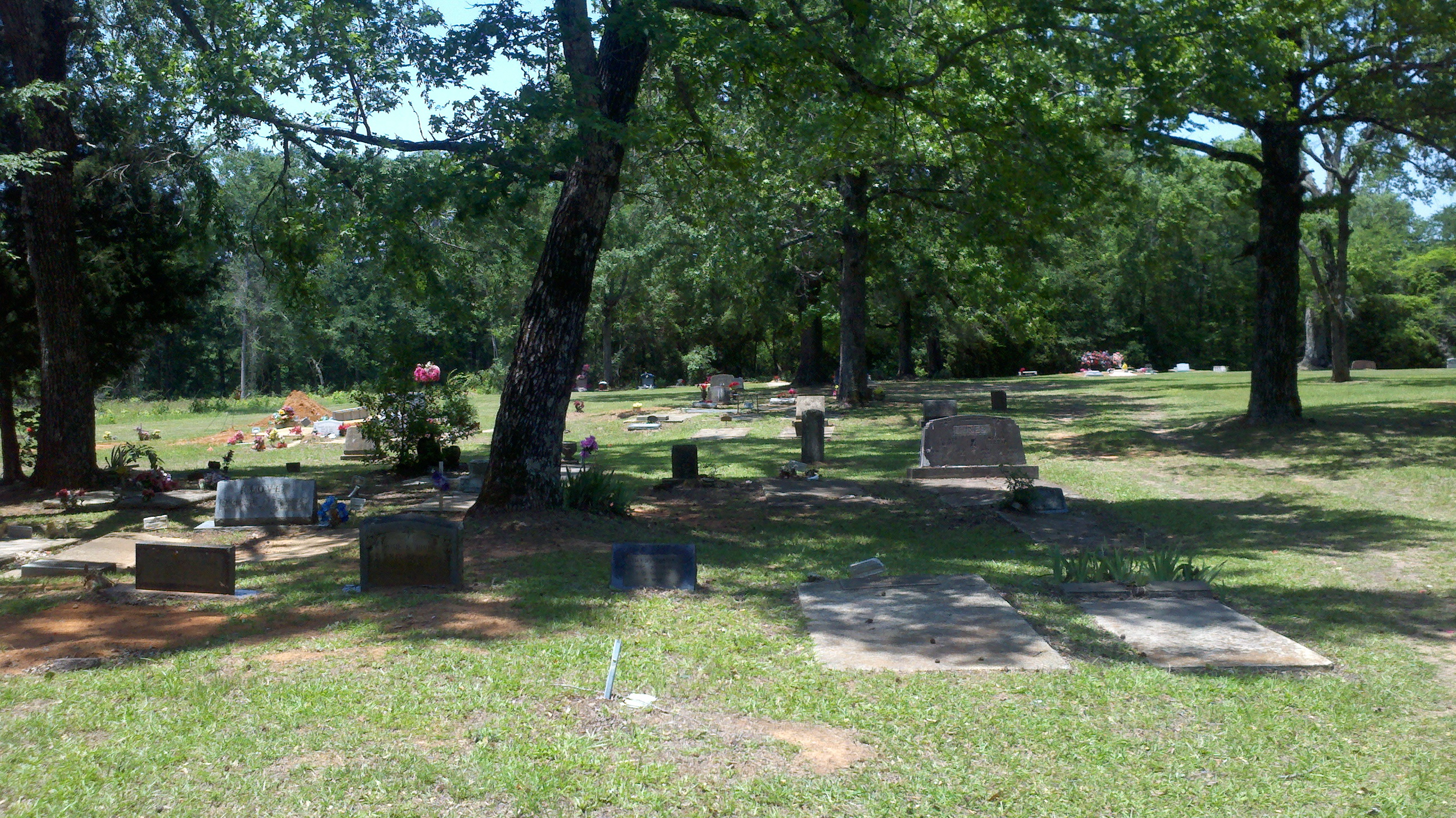
View from the entrance to the cemetery

Whittaker Memorial Cemetery is a cemetery near Kildare, Texas. It was added to the Texas Historical Commission in 1996. The cemetery was once portion of a plantation worked by slaves and those buried are African American. The plantation was owned by Willis Whitaker who separated six acres for slave burials. There are more than 350 people buried at the site and it is still used today.
