= Farmersville Islamic cemetery =

Islamic cemetery in Collin County, Texas

Coordinates: 33.157173°N 96.404099°W

Farmersville Muslim Cemetery
- Interactive map of Farmersville Muslim Cemetery

Details
- Location: Farmersville, Texas

The Farmersville Islamic Cemetery is located in Farmersville, Collin County, Texas. The cemetery became the subject of controversy in 2015 when local residents expressed opposition to the prospect of Muslims being buried near their town. After a consortium of local mosques purchased a plot of land outside the city limits to provide a burial ground for the county's Muslims, the local authorities unanimously granted permission for the plans. However, opposition grew among local residents and the proposals were vehemently denounced in public forums where many residents expressed strongly anti-Islamic sentiments as the basis for their opposition. Council members and planning officials reported receiving death threats and threats were also made to desecrate the site with pigs' blood and severed pigs' heads. The council emphasized that there was little it could do to prevent the cemetery going ahead, as it was bound by local and state planning regulations.

== Background ==
Map of Farmersville in Collin County and in Texas; the site of the proposed cemetery is at the far western end of the incorporated area.

Farmersville is a community of around 3,500 people located 35 miles (56 km) north-east of Dallas; the population is predominately white. In May 2015, the Islamic Association of Collin County (IACC), a group representing the county's five mosques, proposed to buy a 35-acre plot outside the city limits of Farmersville near the junction of U.S. Route 380 and County Road 557, close to the eastern shore of Lake Lavon, and use it primarily for a cemetery. The Muslim community currently uses Restland Cemetery in Dallas but is running out of space there.

The location was chosen as most other Collin County cities had restrictions on building cemeteries. Two acres adjoining the highway would be used for commercial purposes to help fund the cemetery's maintenance, 17.4 acres would be used for gravesites and the remainder would be used for landscaping and maintenance. The site would hold about 20,000 burial plots. The location is within Farmersville's zone of extraterritorial jurisdiction, where the city's zoning ordinances still apply. A $500,000 perpetual bond would be used to support the care and maintenance of the cemetery.

The proposal was submitted to the Farmerville Planning and Zoning Commission in May 2015 and was unanimously approved in a meeting on May 28. After the plans for the cemetery became more widely known, opposition began to grow among county residents. David J. Meeks, the pastor of the Bethlehem Baptist Church, became one of the most outspoken opponents of the cemetery proposal. Despite being rebuked by Southern Baptist officials that he was "on the wrong side of the fence" on the issue, he called Islam a "quasi-pseudo religion" and declared that he felt "the danger is so real that I must do everything I can to stop it." He claimed that the cemetery would become a Muslim enclave within the rural community: "They will expand. How can we stop a mosque or madrassa training center from going in there?".

== History ==
=== Meeting of July 6, 2015 ===
A special meeting of the commission was held on July 6 at which Meeks and others, most of whom lived outside the city limits, protested the cemetery plans. Speakers at the meeting, which was standing room only, expressed concern at how they believed Muslims were buried – which they thought might lead to contamination of the town's drinking water – and how the cemetery would look. Others claimed that the cemetery would lead to the indoctrination of Farmersville children, asserted that Muslims were "at war with us" and declared that they did not want their town to become "a Muslim dumping ground". A city council meeting held on July 14 was dominated by opposition to the cemetery, even though it was not on the agenda. More than 100 people crowded into the council chambers, with others listening from outside. One resident told the meeting, "We used to grow onions here. We sure enough don’t want to be growing bodies". Others threatened to desecrate the site by dumping pigs' blood and heads on it. No vote was taken on the proposal as it was not ready to be voted on.

Khalid Abdur-Rashid, a spokesman for the IACC who is a scholar of Islam at Southern Methodist University, sought to assuage concerns by clarifying that the cemetery would not be used for religious services. The bodies buried there would be entombed in coffins inside concrete vaults, not placed in the soil in shrouds as opponents had claimed. He commented that many Farmersville residents were appalled by the vehemence of the opposition and had contacted the IACC to express their solidarity and support. In his view, the opposition was a sign of how "hate has become a million-dollar industry" in the U.S., but he hoped that the controversy would provide an opportunity to improve understanding of Islam and its practices. He characterized the issue as being about human dignity, saying that the IACC's members "wanted our community to be able to visit their loved ones in a place that is known to provide honor and dignity, and fond memories of those of the past."

The town's mayor, Joe Helmberger, supported the proposal and described opponents' concerns as unfounded. He said that it would be approved if the town authorities were satisfied that development standards had been met and noted that religious freedom was a foundational value of the United States. Other town officials emphasized that they would follow due process and the law. The police chief, Michael Sullivan, said that "whoever comes in this is going to be treated the same. Our role in this is fairly pretty narrow, we’re going to follow the procedures. … There is such thing as a Constitution, and we’re going to adhere to that." Nonetheless, city officials were reported to have received death threats and threats to their livelihoods.

Bart Barber, the pastor of the town's First Baptist Church, also spoke out in support of the proposal, saying that "the rights of conscience are inalienable, and religious conscience is among those inalienable rights – and that includes Muslims. If I can build a church, then Muslims can build a mosque." According to Barber, those opposing the cemetery were only a noisy minority.

The controversy was not the first time that Muslim burial rites had become the focus of dispute in the United States. In 2010 the town of Sidney, New York, voted to investigate how Muslims were burying their dead but dropped the matter after the planned enquiry was broadly criticised. Opposition at Farmersville was intensified by a recent shooting in nearby Garland, where two Islamic extremists were killed as they attempted to attack an exhibition.

=== Town hall panel of August 4, 2015 ===
Abdur-Rashid and Helmberger appeared on a town hall panel at Farmersville High School on August 4, along with City Manager Ben White and City Attorney Alan Lathrom. White expressed the hope that the event would "clear up some of the misconceptions people have surrounding the project," while Abdur-Rashid said he was "stunned by the opposition" and wanted to talk to residents about the proposals.

In advance of the meeting, the city issued a factsheet which, among other things, stated: "There is no terrorist activity associated with this site." Dallas Morning News columnist Jacquielynn Floyd described this as a fact "that ought to go without saying, that really should fall under the heading of 'self-evident truth, you dolt.'" The newspaper published an editorial calling on the town to "show your better side in Muslim cemetery fuss" and suggested that "cooler heads will prevail and more thoughtful conversation will replace the uninformed, uneducated and, at times, repugnant points of view" expressed in previous meetings.

The meeting saw intense hostility being directed at Abdul-Rashid, who was repeatedly jeered, hissed and interrupted by the audience of between 300 and 400 people, with shouts of "You're lying!" and "You're not welcome here!" One man shouted: "I don't hate you. I don't like your religion and I don't even classify it as a religion," while another attendee told the crowd that Muslims were seeking "to populate the United States and take it over". It also emerged that there had been threats against Planning and Zoning Commission officials and City Council members.

Not everyone was hostile; one woman said that she was relieved that a cemetery was planned for the site, as she would not have wished to see it being used for a big-box store or an industrial facility. Another said that she found the controversy "embarrassing, because we're a mockery. The whole world is talking about us... how we're a bunch of hillbillies." A woman living near the site of the proposed cemetery told Abdur-Rashid that "We’re pleased there’s a cemetery going in, and we’d be proud to have you." A local representative of the Veterans of Foreign Wars said that his organization had been "called on to do illegal activities" (without specifying what) but that the VFW would remain neutral, would follow whatever local ordinances mandated and would not seek to prevent the freedom of religion and speech for which its members had fought.

Helmberger told the meeting that he did not support the cemetery but there was nothing he could do about it, and it would likely go ahead as planned. The next stage would be for the planning commissioners and the city council to review the plans and give final approvals in the coming months. As state regulations give the city very little discretion to disapprove a plat, this is likely to be a formality.

Abdur-Rashid told residents that there were no plans to build a mosque or school on the site and gave assurances that "we are not Anti-American, anti freedom, radical, extreme, or dangerous". It would not be a Muslim-only cemetery but would be open for non-Muslim burials as well. He subsequently told local TV station NBCDFW that he felt that the opposition was not specifically about the cemetery, but was instead more to do with "misinformation, and fear and hate. And until we confront that, in open honesty, it will continue to persist."

=== 2017 ===
In 2017, the federal government began investigating the city council's denial. City officials approved the group's application in December 2017.
