= Rose Hill Cemetery (Texarkana, Texas) =

Cemetery in Bowie County, Texas, USA

Coordinates: 33°24′48″N 94°03′16″W

- Interactive map of Rose Hill Cemetery

Details
- Location: Texarkana, Texas
- No. of graves: Over 3,700

Rose Hill Cemetery is located in Texarkana, Texas, with over 3,700 graves.

== Notable burials ==
- Poindexter Dunn (1834–1914), U.S. House of Representatives member from Arkansas
- Robert Lee Henry (1864–1931), U.S. House of Representatives member from Texas
- John Levi Sheppard (1852–1902), U.S. House of Representatives member from Texas
- Howell Washington Runnels Sr. (1867–1927), Texas House of Representatives member
