= George F. Robie =

First lieutenant in US Army

First Lieutenant George Frank Robie
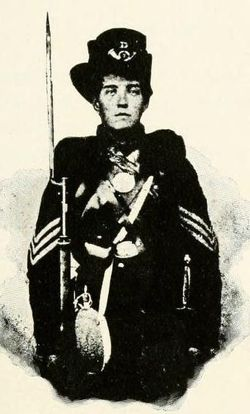
- Born: 17 June 1844; Candia, New Hampshire
- Died: 5 June 1891 (aged 46); Galveston, Texas
- Burial place: New City Cemetery, Galveston, Texas
- Military career
- Allegiance: United States (Union)
- Branch: Army
- Service years: 1861-1865
- Rank: First Lieutenant
- Units: Company D, 7th New Hampshire Infantry
- Conflicts: Richmond, Virginia (1864)
- Awards: Medal of Honor

George Frank Robie (17 June 1844 - 5 June 1891) was a first lieutenant in the United States Army who was awarded the Medal of Honor for gallantry during the American Civil War. He was awarded the medal on 12 June 1883 for actions performed during the Siege of Petersburg in 1864.

== Personal life ==
Robie was born on 17 June 1844 in Candia, New Hampshire to parents Nathaniel D. Robie and Ruth Jane Robie (nee Moore). Nathaniel Robie also served in the Army but did not survive the war. Robie had one younger brother, John Freeman Parker Robie, who lived until 1917. After the war, Robie joined the Louis Bell Post of the G.A.R. and helped charter a post in Galveston, Texas. He worked as a bookkeeper. Robie died on 5 June 1891 in Galveston of "rheumatism", most likely liver disease, and is buried in New City Cemetery in Galveston.

== Military service ==
Before enlisting in New Hampshire, Robie had served a term with the 8th Massachusetts Infantry defending Washington D.C. He enlisted with Company D of the 7th New Hampshire Infantry as a sergeant on 25 September 1861 and was promoted to first sergeant on 28 December 1863. On 15 September 1864, while still a sergeant, Robie demonstrated great bravery during a reconnaissance towards Richmond, which eventually earned him the Medal of Honor. He was promoted to first lieutenant of Company G on 28 October 1864. He was eventually transferred back to Company D and then to Company B before mustering out on 20 July 1865 in Goldsboro, North Carolina.

Robie's Medal of Honor citation reads:

The President of the United States of America, in the name of Congress, takes pleasure in presenting the Medal of Honor to Sergeant George Frank Robie, United States Army, for extraordinary heroism on September, 1864, while serving with Company D, 7th New Hampshire Infantry, in action at Richmond, Virginia, for gallantry on the skirmish line.

— R. T. Lincoln, Secretary of War
