= History of Galveston, Texas =

History of a city in Texas, United States

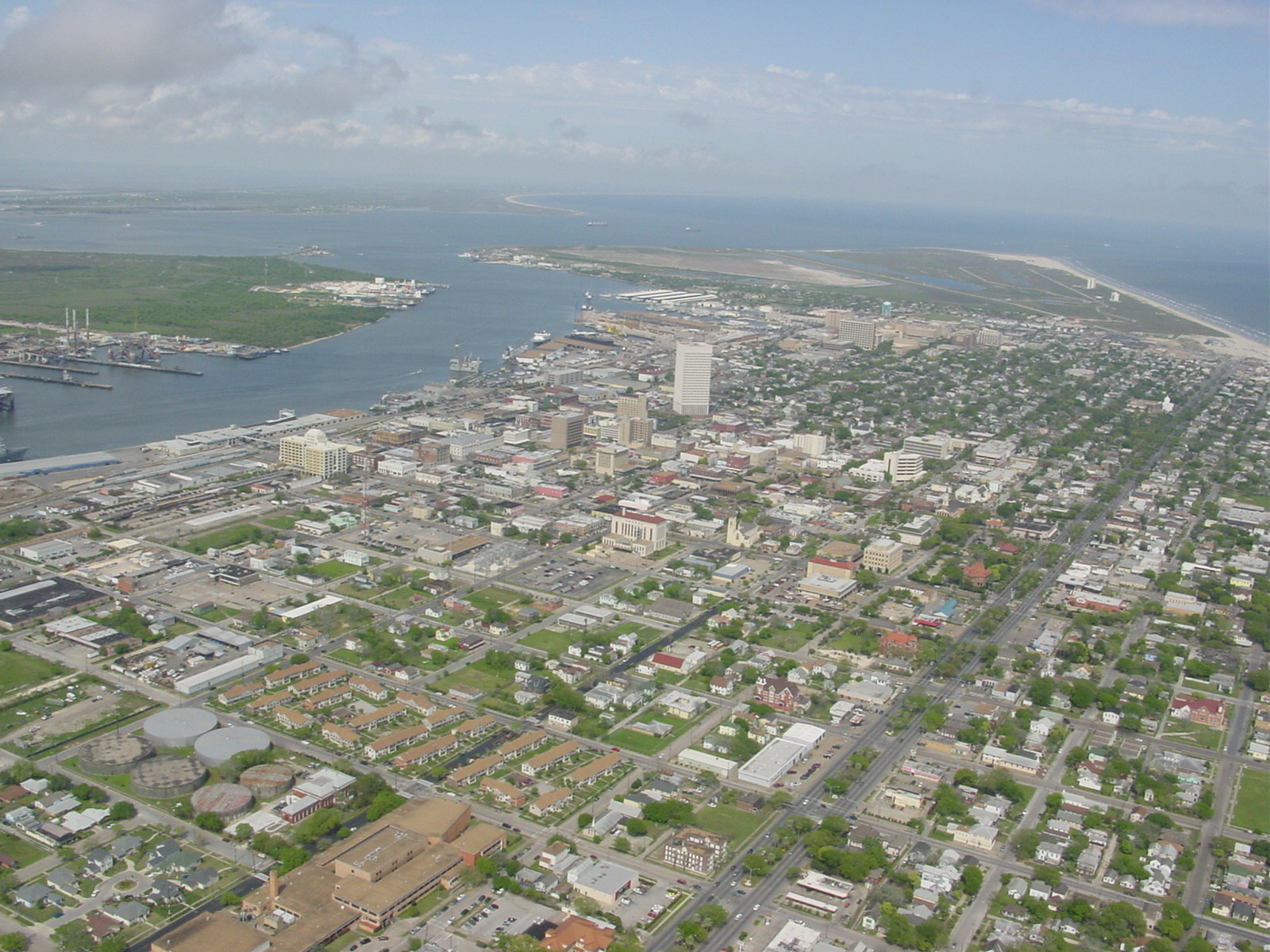
Downtown Galveston as viewed from the air.

The history of Galveston, Texas, begins with the archaeological record of Native Americans who used the island. The first European settlements on the island were constructed by the Spanish from New Spain around 1816. The Port of Galveston was established in 1825 by the Congress of Mexico following its successful revolution from Spain. The city served as the main port for the Texas Navy during the Texas Revolution. Galveston was founded in 1836 by Michel Menard, Samuel May Williams, and Thomas F. McKinney, and briefly served as the capital of the Republic of Texas. The Battle of Galveston was fought in Galveston Bay during the American Civil War when Confederate forces under Major General John B. Magruder attacked and expelled occupying Union troops from the city.

During the mid-19th century, Galveston emerged as an international city with immigration and trade from around the U.S. and the world. The city became one of the nation's busiest ports and the world's leading port for cotton exports. During that era, Galveston became Texas' largest city and was its prime commercial center. In 1900, the island was struck by a devastating hurricane. Even post-Hurricane Katrina, this event holds the record as the United States' deadliest natural disaster.

During the 1920s and 1930s, the city re-emerged as a significant tourist destination centered on casinos and other vice businesses. Featuring venues, such as the famed Balinese Room, the city became nationally known as the sin city of the Gulf. The illegal businesses were finally closed in the 1950s, leading to a long, stagnant economic period. Many businesses relocated off the island, though some, such as the insurance businesses and the medical school, remained.

The city gradually re-emerged as a tourist destination centered on its history and historical buildings. New tourist attractions were established, and further development of the medical school and other area businesses has revitalized the economy in recent decades.

== Exploration and settlement ==
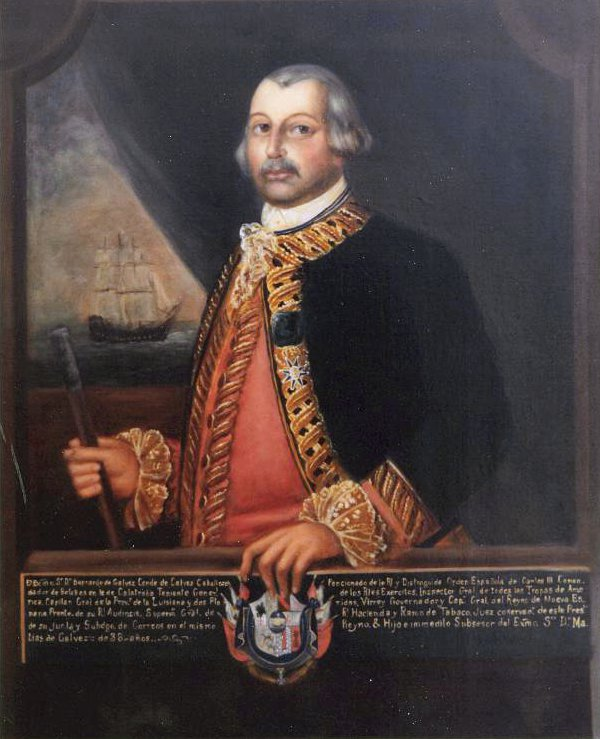
Bernardo de Gálvez, Count of Gálvez

Galveston Island was originally inhabited by members of the Karankawa and Akokisa tribes who used the name "Auia" for the island. In 1519, the Alonso Álvarez de Pineda expedition sailed past Galveston Island en route from the Florida peninsula to the Pánuco River. While Pineda may or may not have actually seen the island, Spain laid claim to the entire Gulf Coast, including Galveston Island, based on the 1519 Pineda expedition. Soon afterward, Cabeza de Vaca and his crew were shipwrecked on the island (or nearby) in November 1528, calling it "Isla de Malhado" ("Isle of Doom"), and from there began his famous trek to Mexico. Various Spanish explorers charting the region referred to the island as "Isla Blanca" ("White Island") and later "Isla de Aranjuez" ("Aranjuez Island"). In 1685 French explorer La Salle named the island "San Louis" ("Saint Louis") and the name became fixed for some time.

The earliest known map of the island and the bay was made by French explorer Bénard de La Harpe in 1721, who left the island unnamed but named the bay "Port François". In 1785, Spanish explorer José de Evia, during his own charting of the Gulf Coast, referred to the island as "San Luis" and the bay as "Bahía de Galveztowm" [sic] ("Galveztowm Bay"), in honor of Bernardo de Gálvez y Madrid, Count of Gálvez. The name San Luis for the island continued to be used by the Spanish and the Mexicans (and later even by Stephen F. Austin's colony), and is still used as the name for the pass at the west end of the island.

The first permanent European settlements on the island were constructed around 1816 by the pirate Louis-Michel Aury as a base of operations to support Mexico's rebellion against Spain. In 1817, Aury returned from an unsuccessful raid against Spain to find the island occupied by the pirate Jean Lafitte, who took up residence there after having been driven from his stronghold in Barataria Bay off the coast of New Orleans, Louisiana. Lafitte organized the island's settlement into a pirate "kingdom" he called "Campeche", anointing himself the "head of government". Lafitte remained at Campeche until 1821 when he and his raiders were given an ultimatum by the United States Navy: leave or be destroyed. Lafitte burned his settlement to the ground and sailed under cover of night for parts unknown.

Following its successful revolution from Spain, the Congress of Mexico proclaimed the establishment of the Port of Galveston on October 17, 1825, and erected a customs house in 1830. During the Texas Revolution, Galveston served as the main port for the Texas Navy. Galveston also served as the capital of the Republic of Texas when, in 1836, interim president David G. Burnet relocated his government from nearby Harrisburg to the island. In 1836, Michel Branamour Menard, a native of Canada, along with several associates, purchased 4,605 acres (18.64 km^{2}) of land for $50,000 from the Austin Colony to found the town that would become the modern city of Galveston. The Congress of the Republic of Texas hired Robert C. Trimble and William Lindsey to survey this land, and they completed the surveys in 1837. That same year, the city plan for Galveston was designed by Gail Borden, laying out the newly established town in a simple gridiron pattern. Menard and his associates began selling plots on April 20, 1838. In 1839, the City of Galveston adopted a charter and was incorporated by the Congress of the Republic of Texas. By this time, the name "San Luis" for the island had been abandoned and "Galveston" had become the island's exclusive name.

The City of Galveston became significant to the slave-trade era of industrialized human trafficking, establishing itself as the largest slave-market west of New Orleans. Census records from 1860 show a population of 1,178 enslaved people compared to around 6,000 free people (including only two free black citizens) living in the city. Yet the proportion of enslaved people was, however, less than the rest of Texas. Succession as a whole, eventually led to the American Civil War, which Texas joined on the side of the Confederacy. The Battle of Galveston was fought in Galveston Bay and island on January 1, 1863, when Confederate forces under Major General John B. Magruder attacked and expelled occupying Union troops from the city, which remained in Confederate hands for the duration of the war. In May 1865, the Lark successfully evaded the Union blockade of Galveston Harbor and headed for Havana, becoming the final Confederate ship to slip through the blockade from any Southern port. In the late 1890s, the Fort Crockett defenses and coastal artillery batteries were constructed in Galveston and along the Bolivar Roads.

Juneteenth is the oldest nationally celebrated commemoration distinguishing the end of slavery in the United States. The annual observance owes its origins to the announcement of the Emancipation Proclamation exemplified by the return of Union Army and the investiture of General Order No. 3 at Galveston, Texas on June 19, 1865. Galveston was the first city in Texas to provide a secondary school and public library for African Americans.

== Golden era ==
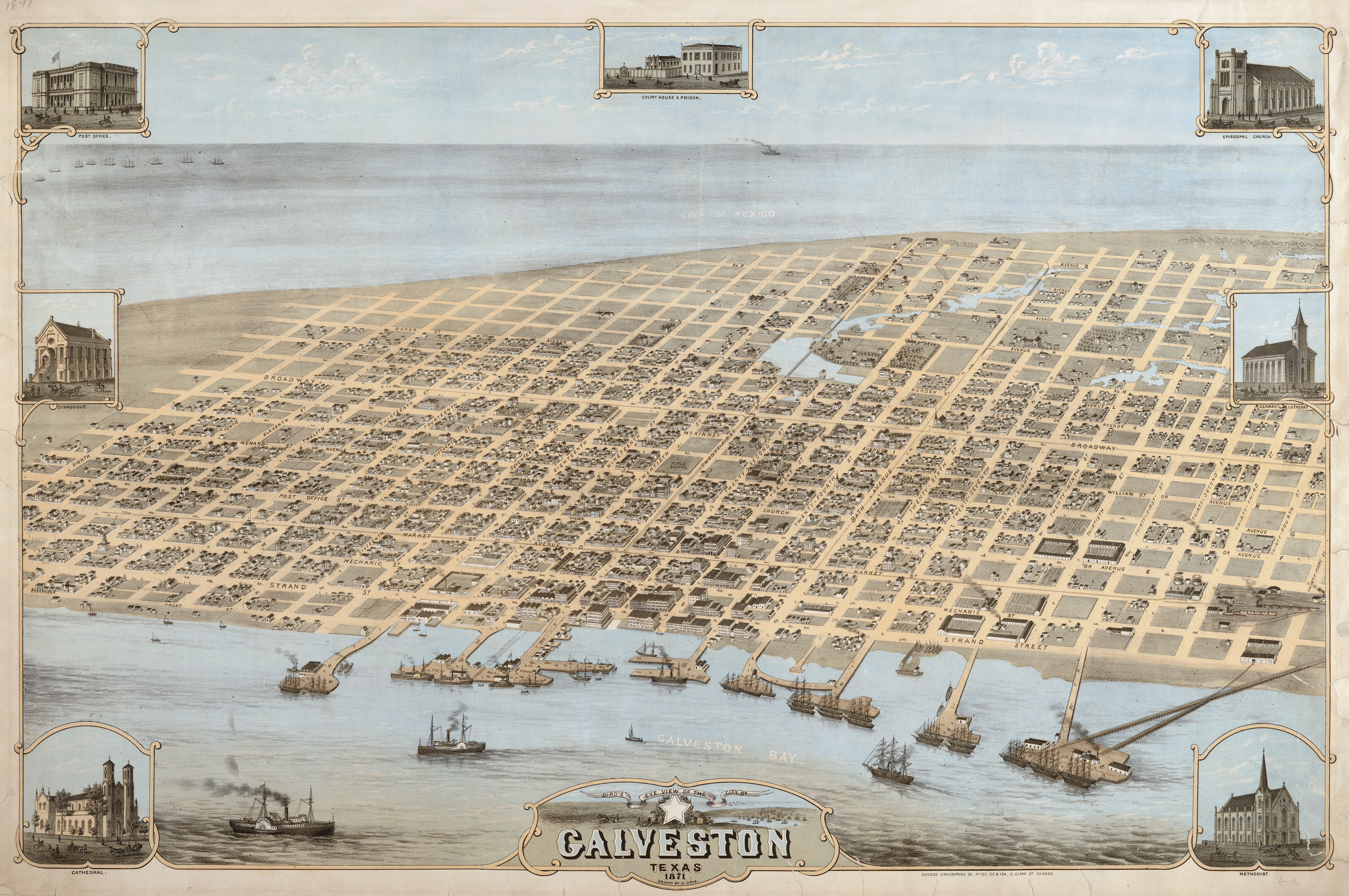
Map of Galveston in 1871

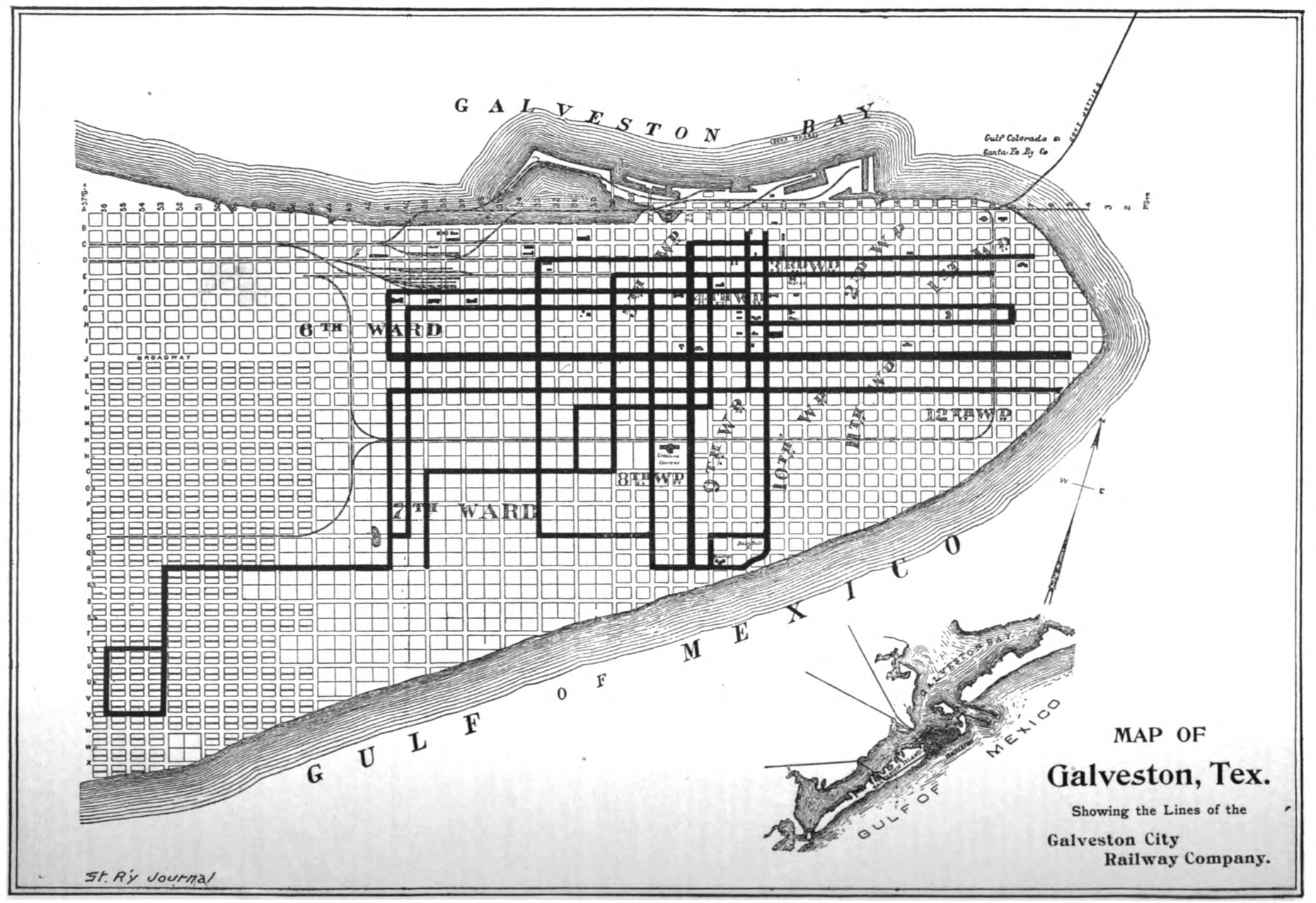
Galveston City Railway Company c 1894

At the end of the 19th century, Galveston was a booming metropolis with a population of 37,000. Its position on the natural harbor of Galveston Bay along the Gulf of Mexico made it the center of trade in Texas and one of the largest cotton ports in the nation, in competition with New Orleans. Between 1838 and 1842, 18 newspapers were started to serve the island's rapidly growing population (The Galveston County Daily News is the sole survivor). A causeway linking the island with the mainland was finished in 1860, which paved the way for railroad expansion.

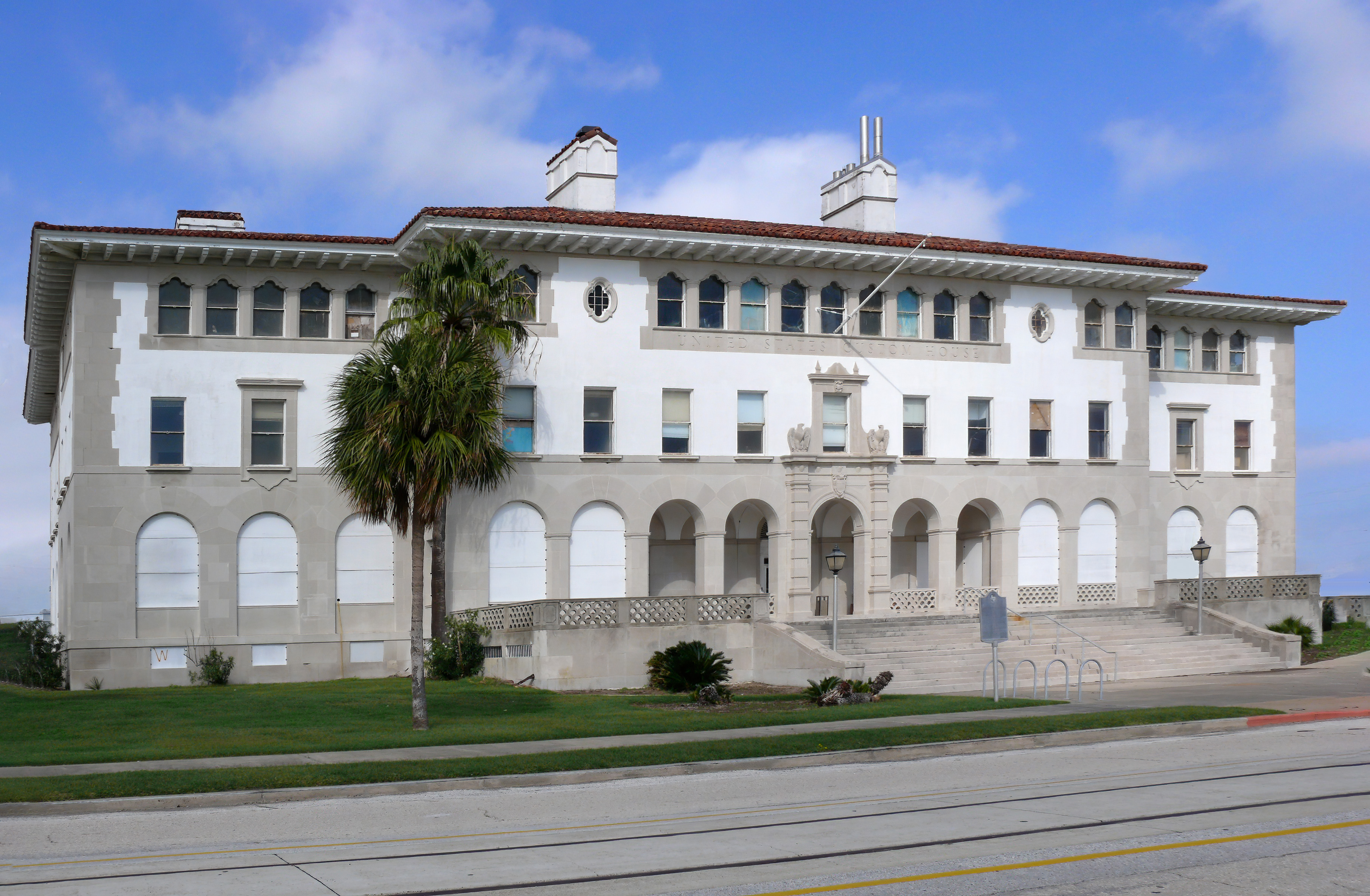
Galveston Immigration Stations

During this golden era of Galveston's history, the city was home to a number of state firsts that include: the first post office (1836), the first naval base (1836), the first Texas chapter of a Masonic order (1840), the first cotton compress (1842), the first parochial school (Ursuline Academy) (1847), the first insurance company (1854), the first gas lights (1856), first Roman Catholic hospital (St. Mary's Hospital) (1866), first Jewish Reform Congregation (Congregation B'nai Israel) (1868), the first opera house (1870), the first orphanage (1876), the first telephone (1878), the first electric lights (1883), the first medical college (now the University of Texas Medical Branch) (1891), and the first school for nurses (1890).

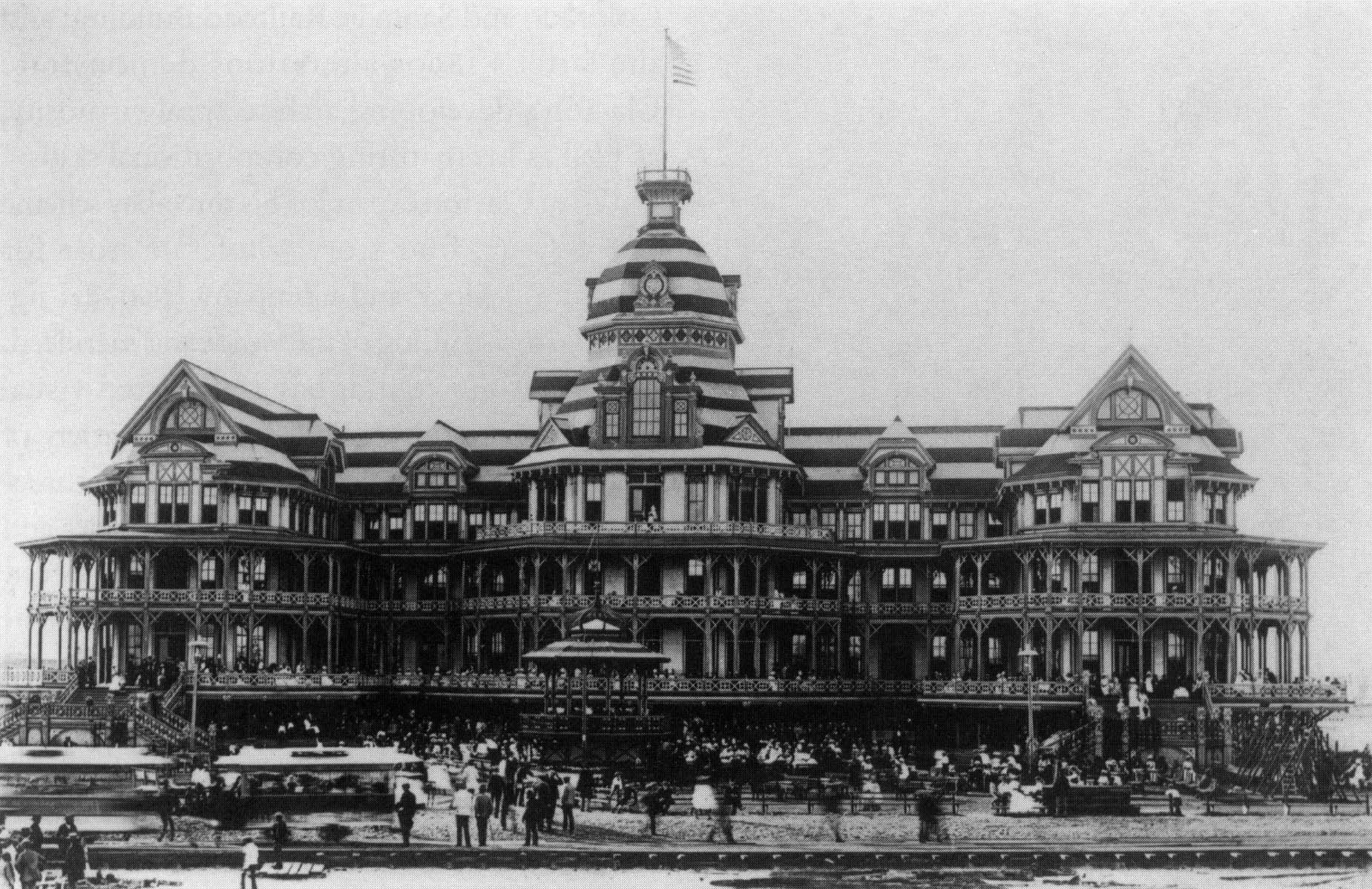
The Beach Hotel catered to vacationers until a fire in 1898.

Galveston was also home to Texas's first Roman Catholic cathedral. In 1839, Rome created the prefecture apostolic of Texas, which was later elevated to a vicariate apostolic on July 10, 1841. Then, on May 4, 1847, Pope Pius IX approved the creation of the Diocese of Galveston and named St. Mary's Church the cathedral for the entire state of Texas.

During the mid-19th century, Galveston, though not a large city by world standards, emerged as an international city with immigration and trade from around the U.S. and the world. The island has sometimes been called the "Ellis Island of the West" as it was the primary point of entry for European immigrants settling in the western United States. German immigration during this period was so great that the German language became a commonly used language on the city's streets. The immigrants were not simply the poor or the oppressed seeking refuge but many of the educated middle class. The Galveston Weekly News described one 1849 ship's arrival as carrying members of the "wealthy class", including lawyers, merchants, and many skilled workers.

The later 19th century was a high point in the history of civil rights for African Americans. In 1860, the U.S. Census lists 7,300 inhabitants in the town, including nearly 1,200 enslaved. During the American Civil War, Confederate forces under Major General John B. Magruder attacked and expelled occupying Union troops from the city in January 1863 in the Battle of Galveston. On June 19, 1865, two months after the end of the war and almost three years after the issuance of the Emancipation Proclamation, General Gordon Granger of the Union Army informed the enslaved people of Texas that they were now free. This news was transmitted via General Order No. 3, an event now commemorated on the federal holiday of Juneteenth.

For a time, Reconstruction limited the power of former enslavers in Texas. Leaders, such as George T. Ruby and Norris Wright Cuney, worked to establish educational and employment opportunities for blacks and organize black voters to support the Republican Party, then the leading party supporting black rights in the South. Cuney's efforts led to higher employment and wages for blacks in the city, especially on the wharves. Eventually, they led to combined black and white trade unions during the 1890s and early 1900s. Cuney himself rose to the chairmanship of the Texas Republican Party, the most powerful position held by any black American in the 19th century.

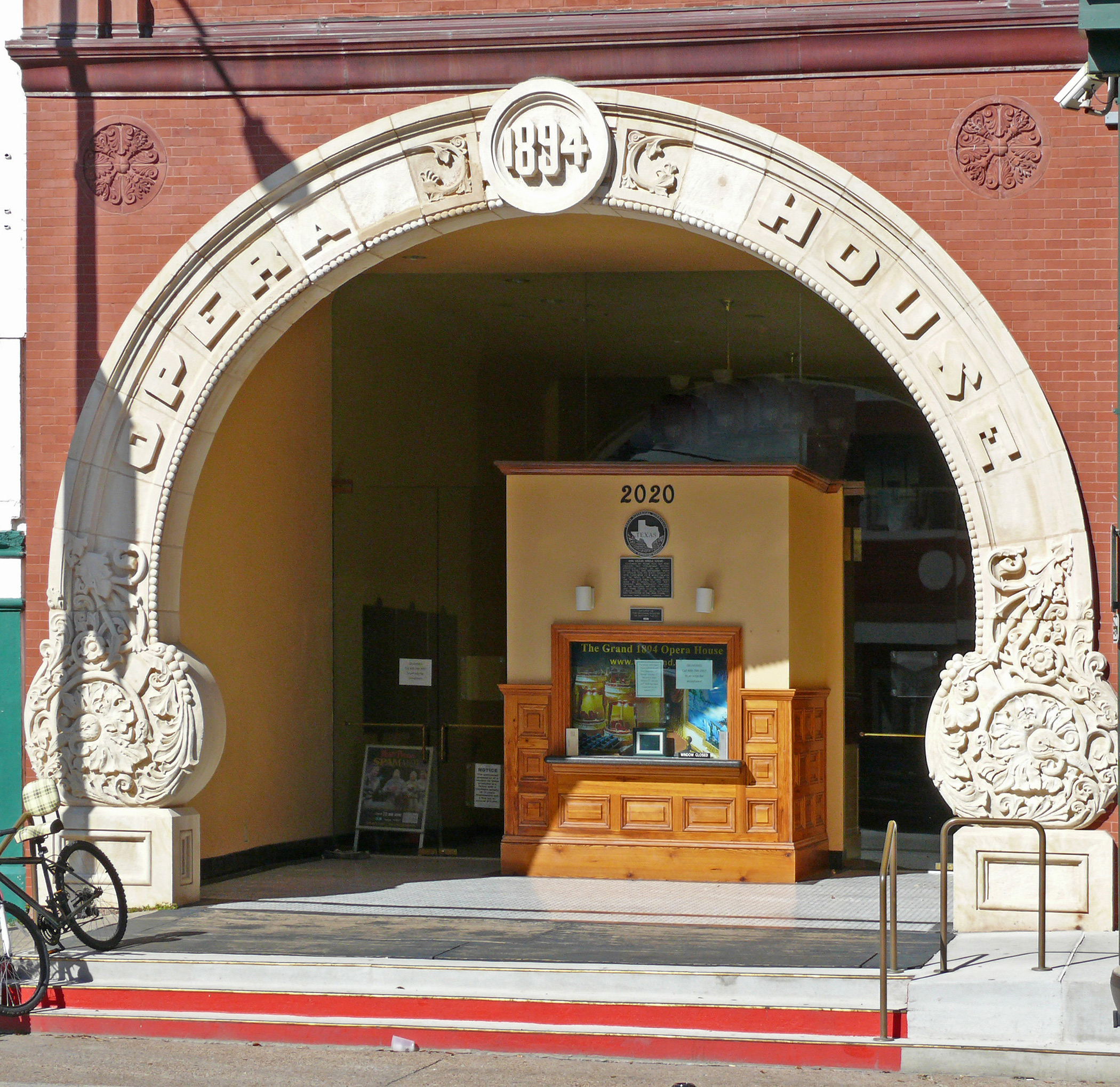
Galveston Grand Opera House

== Storm of 1900 ==
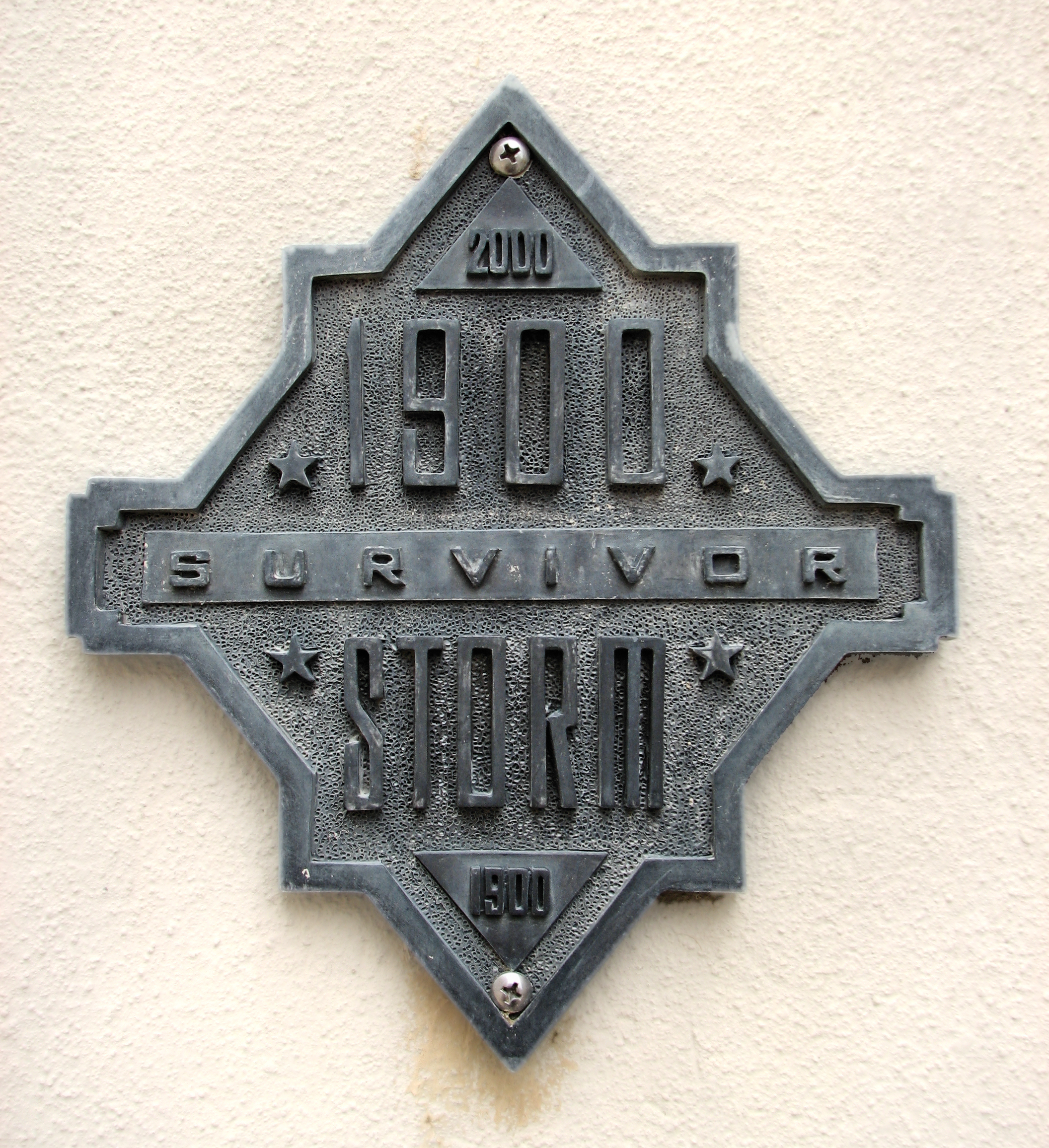
Memorial marker along The Strand indicating a building that survived the 1900 hurricane

On September 8, 1900, the island was struck by a devastating hurricane. Even post-Hurricane Katrina, this event holds the record as the United States' deadliest natural disaster. In the early morning of September 8, high surf, despite prevailing winds out of the north, heralded the oncoming storm. By noon, low-lying areas near the Gulf and the city's bayside flooded, and the winds increased. Near 4 p.m., a storm surge approximately 15 feet (5 m) high slammed into the coast. Wind speeds reached approximately 125 miles per hour (201 km/h) (an estimate, since the anemometer was blown off the U.S. Weather Bureau building). Isaac Cline was the bureau's chief meteorologist. An account of the events surrounding the hurricane, based on his records, is given in Isaac's Storm by Erik Larson. The city was devastated, and an estimated 6,000 to 12,000 people on the island were killed. The disaster did not even spare the buried dead; a number of coffins, including reportedly that of actor-playwright Charles Francis Coghlan who had died in Galveston the previous year, were washed out of the local cemetery to sea by the tidal storm surge. After the storm, the city decided to shore up its defenses against future storms by constructing a permanent concrete seawall along a large portion of the beachfront (1902–1904). The entire grade of the city was raised some 17 feet (5 m) behind the wall to several feet near the Bay (1904–1910).

== Rebuilding and the "Open era" ==
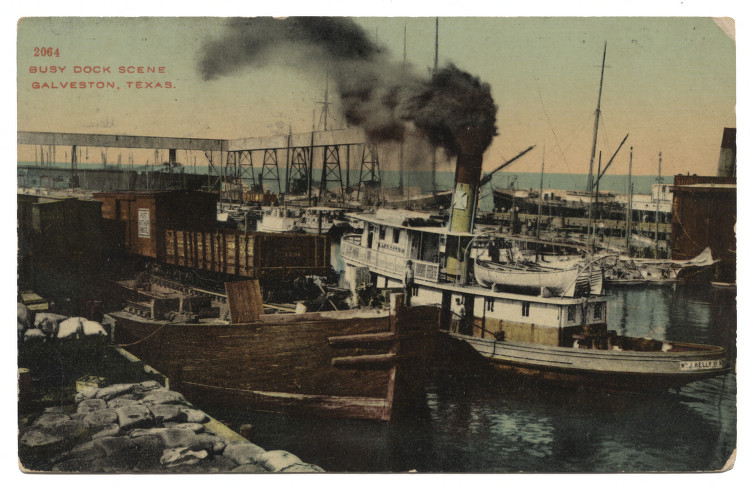
Busy dock scene, Galveston, c. 1912

Despite attempts to draw new investment to the city after the hurricane, Galveston has never fully returned to its previous levels of national importance or prosperity. Development was also hindered by the construction of the Houston Ship Channel, which brought the Port of Houston into direct competition with the natural harbor of the Port of Galveston for sea traffic. To further her recovery and rebuild her population, Galveston actively solicited immigration. Through the efforts of Rabbi Henry Cohen and Congregation B'nai Israel, Galveston became the focus of an immigration plan called the Galveston Movement that, between 1907 and 1914, diverted roughly 10,000 Eastern European, Jewish immigrants from the crowded cities of the Northeastern United States. Additionally numerous other immigrant groups, including Greeks, Italians and Russian Jews came to the city during this period. This immigration trend substantially altered the ethnic makeup of the island, as well as many other areas of Texas and the western U.S.

Though the storm stalled economic development and the city of Houston grew into the region's principal metropolis, Galveston regained some of its former glory. Recognizing the need for Galveston to diversify from the traditional port-related industries, in 1905, William Lewis Moody, Jr., a member of one of Galveston's leading families, founded the American National Insurance Company. Two years later, Mr. Moody would further invest in Galveston by establishing the City National Bank, which would later become the Moody National Bank.

A military facility by the US Army Coastal Artillery on Galveston Island was established in the late 1890s, and construction, which was disrupted by the 1900 Galveston hurricane, was completed in the early 1900s, with the facility being named Fort Crockett in 1903. Fort Crockett was a US Army artillery training center during World War I. Soldiers bound for France trained in the use of several types of artillery. During the 1920s and early 1930s, Fort Crockett housed the United States Army Air Corps (USAAC) 3rd Attack Group (an ancestor to USAF's 3rd Wing). At this time, the 3rd Attack Group was the only USAAC group devoted solely to attack aircraft. During World War II, the fort focused on defense against German U-boats and served as a prisoner-of-war camp. Following the war, Fort Crockett served as an army recreational center for several years.

The Galveston–Houston Electric Railway was established in 1911 and ran between the city and Houston. The railway was recognized as the fastest interurban line in 1925 and 1926.

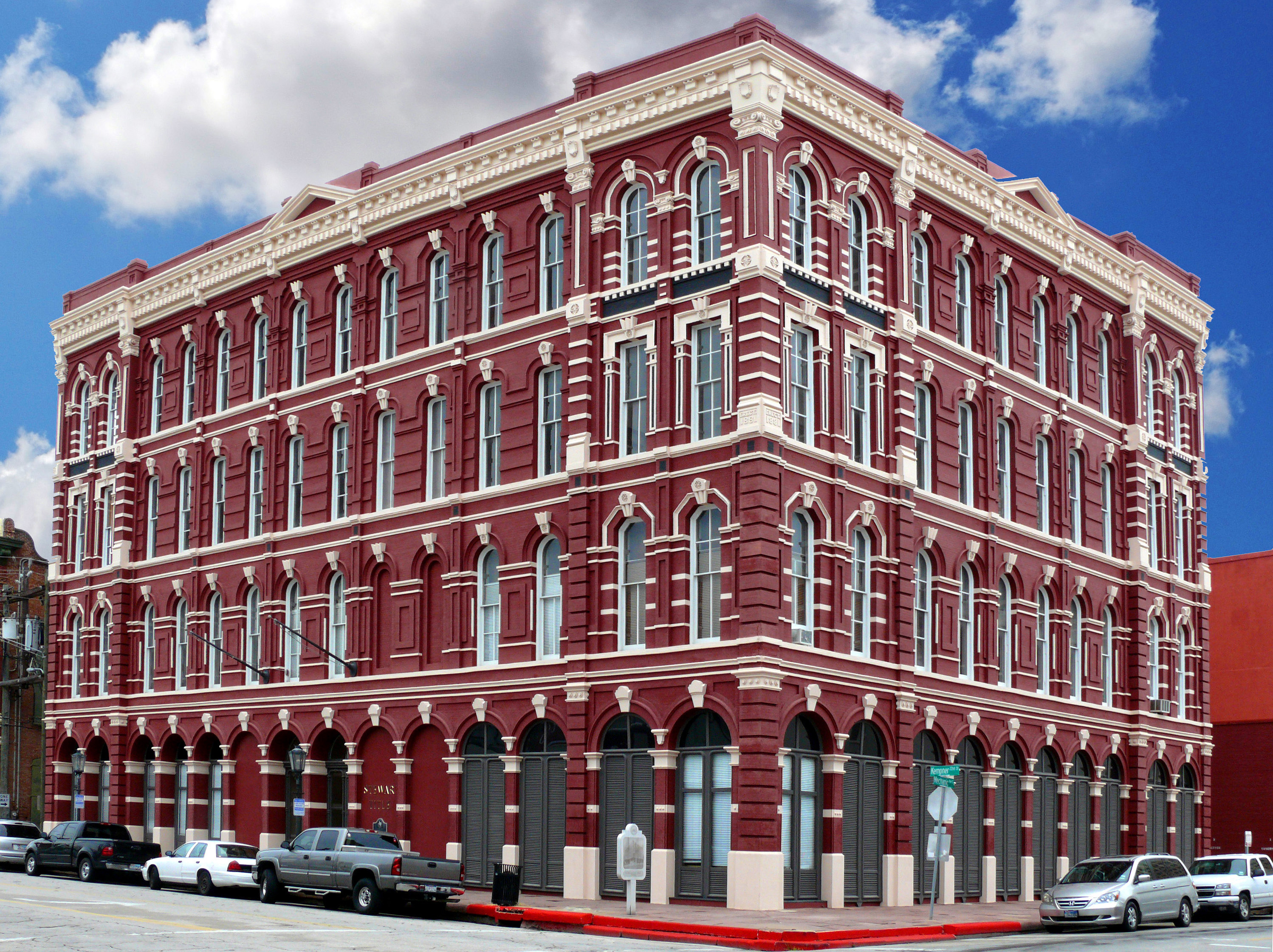
Stewart Title building in Downtown Galveston

During the 1920s and 1930s, the city re-emerged as a major tourist destination. Under the influence of Sam Maceo, Rosario Maceo, and Oscar "Dutch" Voigt, the city exploited the prohibition of liquor and gambling in clubs like the Balinese Room, offering entertainment to wealthy Houstonians and other out-of-towners. Combined with prostitution, which had existed in the city since well before the American Civil War, Galveston became known as the sin city of the Gulf. Galvestonians accepted and even supported the illegal activities, often referring to their island as the "Free State of Galveston". The island had entered what would later become known as the open era. Aside from the vice-oriented entertainment the city hosted many legitimate entertainment venues and events. One of the most famous was the annual "Pageant of Pulchritude" beauty contest. This event became the first international contest and attracted participants from England, Russia, Turkey, Brazil, and many other nations until its demise in 1932.

The 1930s and 1940s brought much change to the Island City. KLUF radio began broadcasting in 1937. During the World War II, the Galveston Municipal Airport, a predecessor to Scholes International Airport, was redesignated as a U.S. Army Air Corps base and named "Galveston Army Air Field". The United States Army Corps of Engineers, using funds made available by Congress through the Civil Aeronautics Authority, constructed three 6,000-foot (1,800 m) long, hard-surface runways at the airport to accommodate army aircraft. In January 1943, Galveston Army Air Field was officially activated with the 46th Bombardment Group serving an anti-submarine role in the Gulf of Mexico. Later it was replaced by the 10th anti-submarine squadron, flying RM-37 Lockheed Venturas.

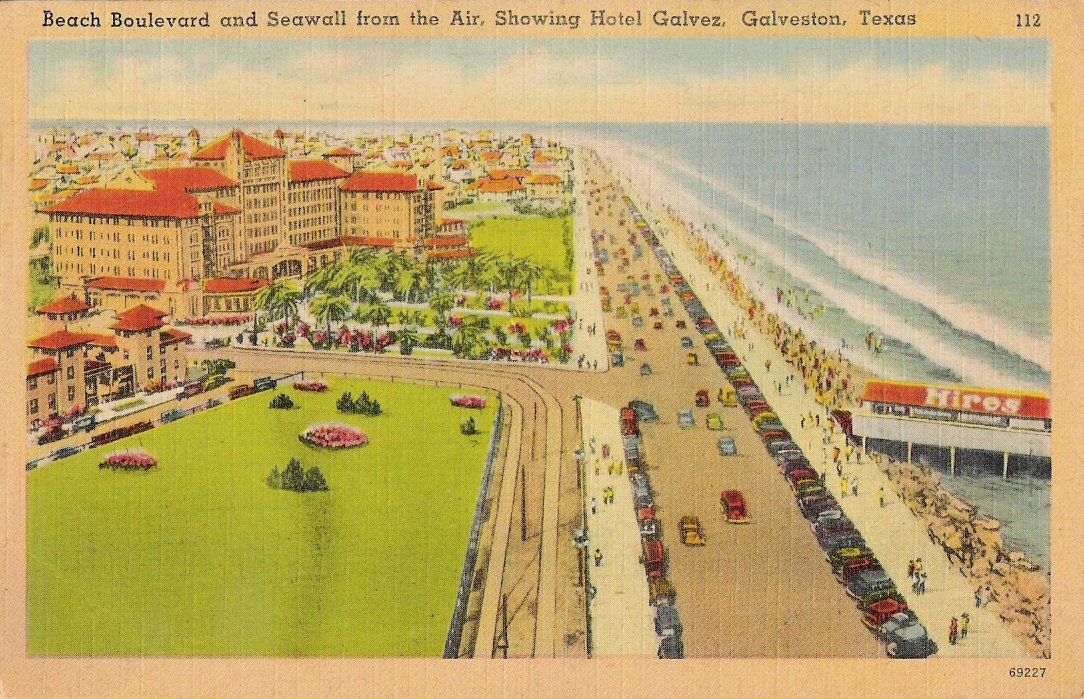
Postcard view of Beach Boulevard, early 1940s

In 1942, William Lewis Moody, Jr., along with his wife Libbie Shearn Rice Moody, established the Moody Foundation with the purpose of "benefiting present and future generations of Texans". The foundation, one of the largest in the United States, would play a prominent role in Galveston during later decades, helping to fund numerous civic and health-oriented programs.

The end of the war drastically reduced military investment in the island. Increasing enforcement of gambling laws and the growth of Las Vegas put pressure on the gaming industry on the island. Finally, in 1957, Texas Attorney General Will Wilson and the Texas Rangers began a massive campaign of raids which wrecked gambling and prostitution in the city. As these vice industries crashed, so did tourism taking the rest of the Galveston economy with it. Neither the economy nor the culture of the city was the same afterward. Civic leaders made several failed attempts at new ventures including the failed Oleander Bowl football tournament and the Pelican Island Bridge for access to a new industrial park which never materialized. Nevertheless, key non-entertainment sectors such as insurance, banking, and the medical school helped to keep the economy viable.

== Recent history ==
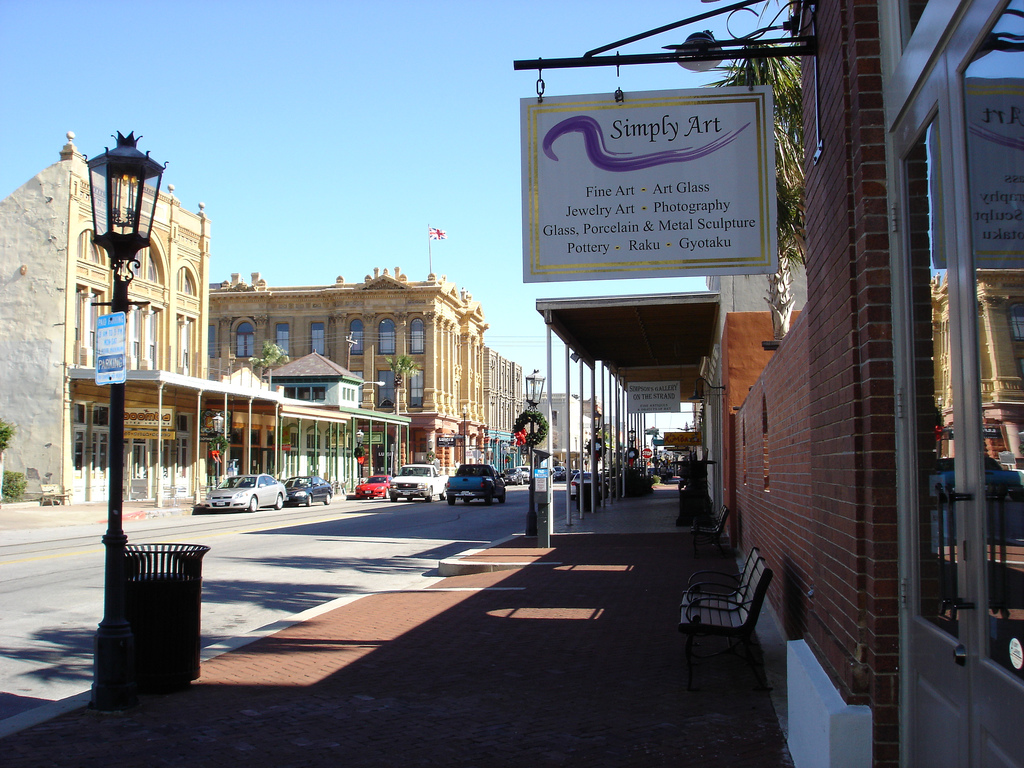
Strand Historic District

The economy of the island entered a long, stagnant period. Many businesses relocated off of the island. By 1959, Houston had long out-paced Galveston in population and economic growth. Recognizing this, the Reverend Wendelin J. Nold, fifth bishop of the Galveston Diocese, was permitted by the Vatican to erect a Cathedral of convenience in Houston, naming Sacred Heart Church as co-cathedral. The diocese was designated the Diocese of Galveston-Houston. Galveston and St. Mary's Cathedral Basilica remained the home of the diocese, but now the bishop could more easily access the rapidly growing Roman Catholic population in Houston.

Beginning in 1957, the Galveston Historical Foundation began its efforts to preserve historic buildings. The 1966 book The Galveston That Was helped encourage the preservation movement. Restoration efforts financed by motivated investors, notably Houston businessman George P. Mitchell, gradually created the Strand Historic District and reinvented other areas. A new, family-oriented tourism emerged in the city over many years.

In September 1961, an F4 tornado generated by landfalling Hurricane Carla hit the city, killing eight and injuring 200.

The 1960s saw the expansion of higher education in Galveston. Already home to the University of Texas Medical Branch, the city got a boost in 1962 with the creation of the Texas Maritime Academy, a predecessor of Texas A&M University at Galveston; by 1967, a community college, Galveston College, had been formed to help provide affordable education to the community.

In the 2000s, property values rose after expensive projects were completed and demand for second homes increased. This led some middle-class families to move from Galveston to other areas such as League City, Texas City, and La Marque. The city population remained relatively the same from 2000 to 2005 according to the U.S. Census Bureau. In 2007, The Associated Press compiled a list of the most vulnerable places to hurricanes in the U.S., and Galveston was one of five areas named. Among the reasons cited were low elevation and the single evacuation route off the island, which is blocked by the fourth largest city in the United States, Houston.

Hurricane Ike made landfall on Galveston Island in the early morning of September 13, 2008, as a Category 2 hurricane with winds of 110 miles per hour (180 km/h) Ike produced waves and a rising storm surge of about 14 feet (4.3 m), which went around the famous Galveston Seawall, flooding the city via the storm sewers, and the unprotected "bay side" of the island, before the first winds or drop of rain. The storm left Galveston without electricity, gas, water pressure and basic communications. The Balinese Room, a historic nightclub, formerly a notorious illegal gambling hall, which was located on a 600-foot (200 m) pier extending into the Gulf of Mexico, was destroyed in the storm. The island has since re-established services and the population has returned but some damage remains. Discussions are currently underway to build a so-called Ike Dike which would protect Galveston and the bay.

The project was still under discussion in 2017, although the Sierra Club and other environmentalists warned about the area's risk to marine life. Several groups were providing recommendations on the technical aspects and design of the storm-surge protection system. The federal 2023 Defense Authorization bill included $31 billon for the project. and in June 2023, the Texas legislature authorized $550 million for the Ike Dike.

== See also ==
- History of Houston
- History of the Galveston Bay Area
