= William Moody =

William Moody may refer to:

- William Moody (pirate) (died 1719), pirate active in the Caribbean and off the coast of Africa
- William Alvin Moody (1954–2013), professional wrestling manager also known by his ring name Paul Bearer
- William Henry Moody (1853–1917), U.S. Supreme Court Justice, U.S. Attorney General and U.S. Secretary of the Navy
- William Lewis Moody Jr. (1865–1954), founded the American National Insurance Company and built it into a $3 billion powerhouse
- William Lewis Moody Sr. (1828–1920), colonel in the American Civil War and founder of the Moody financial empire
- William Vaughn Moody (1869–1910), American dramatist and poet
- William Moody (Maine politician) (1770–1822), American politician from Maine
- William J. Moody (1796–1850s), American lawyer, judge, and politician
- William R. Moody (1900–1985), bishop of the Episcopal Diocese of Lexington
- William Moody (footballer). (born 1895), English footballer, played for Rochdale, Mid Rhondda and Cardiff City
- Bill Moody (detective), detective chief superintendent in London
- Bill Moody (judge), American judge
- Bill Moody (author) (1941–2018), American writer and jazz drummer

== See also ==
- William Mody, MP
