= Mary Moody Northen =

American businesswoman

- Born: Mary Elizabeth Moody; February 10, 1892; Galveston, Texas, U.S.
- Died: August 25, 1986 (aged 94); Galveston, Texas, U.S.
- Resting place: Galveston Memorial Cemetery, Hitchcock, Texas, U.S.
- Occupations: Insurance & Banking Executive; Philanthropist
- Known for: Financial & Philanthropic Endeavors
- Spouse: Edwin Clyde Northen
- Parent: William Lewis Moody, Jr.
- Relatives: Shearn Moody, Jr. (nephew)

Mary Elizabeth Moody Northen (10 February 1892 – 25 August 1986) was an American financier and philanthropist from Galveston, Texas. She was the daughter of financial and insurance tycoon William Lewis Moody, Jr. and aunt of businessman Shearn Moody, Jr.

== Personal life ==
Northen was born to William Lewis Moody, Jr. and Libbie Rice Moody (née Shearn) on February 10, 1892, in Galveston, Texas and was one of four children. Mary Elizabeth married Edwin Clyde Northen in 1915, however they had no children. Instead, Northen focused most of her time on her father's "financial empire", including sitting on various boards of companies and dining with her father every evening to discuss business.

== Business interests ==
Upon the death of her father, William Lewis Moody, Jr., she was named president or chairman of the board of more than 50 corporations her father had controlled, including the American National Insurance Company which, at the time of Moody's death, was the biggest insurance company west of the Mississippi River and the Victorian Condo Hotel. She was also named chairman of the board for the Moody National Bank. Northen continued to maintain control over the family's companies, until her own death in 1986.

== Legacy and death ==
In 1942, her parents set up the Moody Foundation, to which their estate was transferred after their deaths. The Foundation awards grants to various civic and environmental causes in Texas. Northen was installed as chairman of the foundation after her father's death and continued to run the foundation until her own death in 1986. Today the Moody Foundation has grown into a $1.197 billion USD charitable foundation, making grants throughout the state of Texas.

Through her work with the Moody Foundation, she helped to fund the restoration of many historic structures in Galveston, including an abandoned Santa Fe Railroad depot and office building, turning it into a railroad museum, and the 1877 iron sailing bark Elissa. Under Northen's direction, the Moody Foundation also provided seed money to help establish the Texas A&M University at Galveston

Northen established herself as a philanthropist in her own right in 1964 with the founding of Mary Moody Northen Foundation, a private charitable foundation. In her will she directed the Northen foundation's trustees to restore her childhood Galveston home, "The Moody Mansion", and maintain it as a museum, as well as maintain the Mountain Lake Hotel, a nature sanctuary and resort in Virginia.

Northen died in Galveston on August 25, 1986, at the age of 94. Her funeral was attended by more than a thousand people and Texas Governor Mark White ordered flags flown at half-staff at state buildings in her honor.

== See also ==
- Moody Gardens
