= William Lewis Moody Sr. =

American entrepreneur

- Born: May 19, 1828; Essex County, Virginia, US
- Died: July 17, 1920 (aged 92); Galveston, Texas, US
- Resting place: Chesterfield County, Virginia
- Education: University of Virginia
- Occupations: Lawyer and financier
- Title: Colonel
- Successor: William Lewis Moody Jr.
- Political party: Democratic
- Spouse: Pherabe Elizabeth (Lizzie) Bradley
- Children: 3, including William Lewis Moody Jr.
- Relatives: Mary Moody Northen (granddaughter); Shearn Moody Jr. (great-grandson)

Colonel William Lewis Moody Sr. (May 19, 1828 – July 17, 1920) was an American entrepreneur who founded the Moody dynasty in Galveston, Texas. He participated in the Civil War on the side of the Confederacy. On January 19, 1860, he married Pherabe Elizabeth (Lizzie) Bradley. He is noted for persuading federal and local government to dredge Galveston's harbor, which led to Galveston becoming a prominent shipping port of the 19th century. He was survived by his son, William Lewis Moody Jr.

== Family life and education ==
William Lewis Moody was born to Jameson Moody and Mary Susan (Lankford) Moody in Essex County, Virginia. He attended law school at the University of Virginia from 1847 to 1851. After passing the bar exam, he moved to Fairfield, Texas, where he practiced law and operated a mercantile trading company. Eventually he started W.L. Moody & Co. with his two brothers, David Jameson Moody and Leroy F. Moody.

William and Lizzie had six children. One was still born and two daughters died in infancy. His two sons were William Lewis Moody Jr. and Frank Bradley Moody. His only daughter, Mary Emily Moody, married Sealy Hutchings of Galveston.

== Adult life ==
In the summer of 1861, Moody organized Company G of the Seventh Texas Infantry, and he served as captain of the company. The unit, under the command of Moody's friend John Gregg, was captured at the Battle of Fort Donelson. Moody spent six months in the federal prison camps of Camp Douglas, Camp Chase, and Johnson's Island before he was released in a prisoner exchange in September 1862. He fought in the spring 1863 campaigns in Mississippi and was commended for his bravery at the Battle of Raymond on May 12. On July 10, he was wounded while fighting near Jackson, Mississippi, and was sent back to Texas to recover. He was elevated to the rank of colonel and remained in Austin for the rest of the war.

In 1866, Moody moved his family to Galveston, and he began working in the cotton industry. In the 1870s and 1880s, Moody worked with other businessmen to develop railroad lines from the island to the mainland and to dredge Galveston's harbor. In 1872 he participated in the founding of the Galveston Cotton Exchange and served as the president from 1877 to 1882, 1884 to 1888, and 1898 to 1900. In 1894 W.L. Moody and Company built the first dockside cotton compress in Texas. With his son, William Lewis Moody Jr., he opened a bank. Moody Bank soon merged with the National Bank of Texas.

He was elected to the Texas legislature in 1873, but was quickly promoted to the position of Texas financial agent at the behest of the then Governor, Richard Coke.
