= Shearn Moody Jr. =

American financier, entrepreneur and philanthropist

- Born: May 23, 1933; Galveston, Texas, US
- Died: June 25, 1996 (aged 63); Galveston, Texas, US
- Resting place: Galveston Memorial Cemetery, Hitchcock, Texas, U.S.
- Occupation: Financier
- Relatives: William Lewis Moody Jr. (grandfather); Mary Moody Northen (aunt)

Shearn Moody Jr. (May 23, 1933 – June 25, 1996) was an American financier, entrepreneur, and philanthropist from Galveston, Texas. He was heir to a financial empire and originator of the Moody Gardens resort complex. Moody was the grandson of insurance and financial tycoon William Lewis Moody Jr.

== Personal life ==
Shearn Moody Jr., was born on May 23, 1933, to Shearn Moody Sr. and Frances Moody Newman in Galveston, Texas. His father died in 1936, while he was an infant. Moody was well known for eccentric behavior, such as building a slide from his bedroom window to a swimming pool, where he kept pet penguins, and wearing house slippers wherever he went. Moody, a homosexual, never married and spent the final years of his life involved in civil court cases. His longtime partner was a former Las Vegas dancer named Jimmy Stoker. Moody felt that the court system was corrupt and believed that his enemies used the legal system to try to steal his wealth and power; he claimed to have employed "several hundred" lawyers in various legal battles and even at one point hired nationally known lawyer Roy Cohn to help in his ongoing litigation problems. Moody died at home in 1996, after suffering from years of chronic high blood pressure and kidney disease.

== Business and legal dealings ==
His grandfather, William L. Moody Jr., made a fortune by founding the American National Insurance Company, and the younger Moody hoped to follow in his grandfather's footsteps by establishing the Alabama-based Empire Life Insurance Company. This dream was short lived, however, as in 1972 his own company ousted him after the federal government began investigating his business dealings. The investigation would eventually lead to his conviction of bankruptcy fraud. In 1987 Moody was convicted by a federal court of mail fraud and wire fraud in connection with attempts to defraud his family's Moody Foundation. Moody had long served on the board of the charitable foundation, helping to direct millions of dollars in grants to just causes. However the Internal Revenue Service accused him making millions of dollars of grants to himself, and therefore owing more than $14 million in taxes and penalties. After a trial that included accusations of witchcraft, Moody singing a risque song he had commissioned about the legal profession, and threats to "blow the legs off" former Watergate attorney Douglas Caddy, a federal appellate court overturned the convictions.

In 1987, Moody was featured on the cover of Texas Monthly magazine and proclaimed "the sleaziest man in Texas" and in November 1989, after an investigation spanning more than a decade, he was convicted of bankruptcy fraud in connection with the now defunct Empire Life Insurance Company. Although sentenced to five years in federal prison, Moody served little time and was released on parole in May 1991.

== Legacy ==
In his later years, Moody devoted much of his time to his work on the board of directors of Moody Gardens. He was quoted in the Houston Chronicle as saying, "I originally conceived the project of the gardens because we wanted to use the gardens to give this community another source of income."

== See also ==
- American National Insurance Company
- Moody Foundation
- Moody Gardens
