= Moody Foundation =

American charitable foundation

Coordinates: 29°18′17″N 94°47′38″W

- Founded: August 22, 1942
- Founder: William Lewis Moody Jr. Libbie Rice Shearn Moody
- Type: Grant making private foundation (IRS exemption status): 501(c)(3)
- Purpose: Arts, education, environment, public green spaces, health, and social services
- Location: 2303 Postoffice St, #704 Galveston, Texas
- Region served: Texas
- Method: Endowment
- Key people: Chairman - Frances Moody-Dahlberg
- Endowment: $1.8 billion USD
- Website: www.moodyf.org

The Moody Foundation is a charitable foundation incorporated in Texas and based in the island city of Galveston. It was chartered in 1942 by William Lewis Moody Jr. and his wife Libbie Rice Shearn Moody "to benefit, in perpetuity, present and future generations of Texans." The Foundation focuses the majority of its funding on programs involving education, social services, children's needs, and community development.

== Foundation description ==
For more than 75 years, the Moody Foundation has supported projects and programs that better communities in the state of Texas. Since then, the Foundation has awarded over $1.5 billion and over 4,000 grants to organizations across the state that have educated, healed, nurtured and inspired generations of Texans. Grants are made through its Galveston, Texas headquarters and through a field office located in Dallas. In terms of assets, it is one of the largest foundations in Texas, and among the top 100 largest charitable foundations in the United States.

=== Financial information ===
The Foundation's main source of revenue consists of dividends from stock held in the American National Insurance Company, the majority of which is controlled by both the Moody Foundation and the Libbie Shearn Moody Trust. The trust department of the Moody National Bank administers the finances of both the Foundation and the Trust.

== Major Grants and Initiatives ==
The Foundation commits the majority of its grants and funding to the Foundation-initiated projects of Moody Gardens, the Transitional Learning Center, the Moody Scholars Program and the Generation Moody Education Initiative. Over the years, it has expanded the scope of its grants to include projects across Texas.

=== Moody Gardens ===
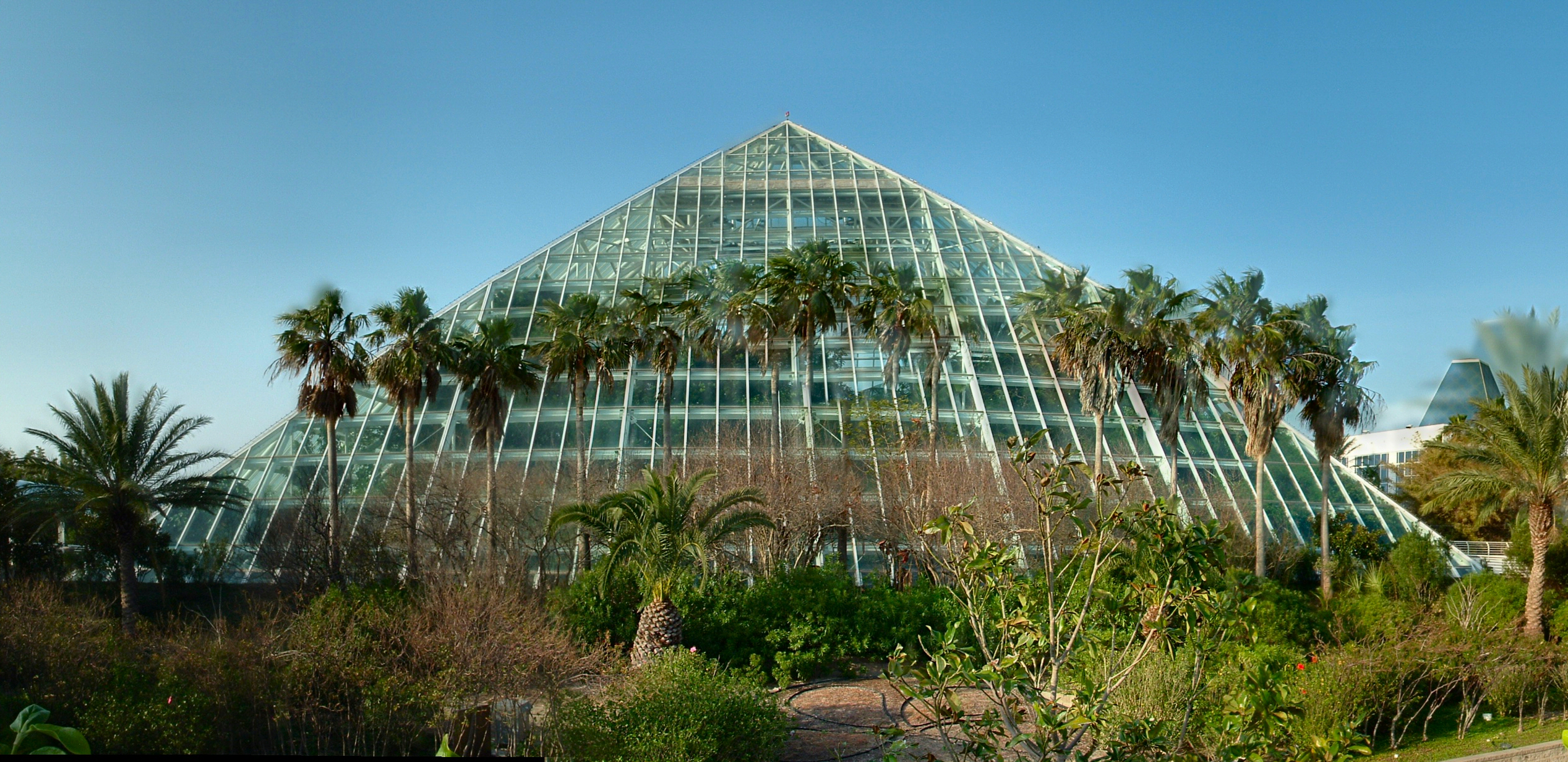
Moody Gardens' Rainforest Pyramid

Moody Gardens is an educational & tourist complex located in the foundation's home city of Galveston, Texas. It is owned, through a complex agreement, by the City of Galveston but funded, operated, and supported by the foundation. As of 2005, the foundation had expended almost $300 million USD towards the construction, expansion, and maintenance of the facility.

Moody Gardens features three main attractions: the Aquarium Pyramid, which is one of the largest in the world and holds many species of fish and other sealife; the Rainforest Pyramid, which contains tropical fauna and flora; and the Discovery Pyramid, which focuses on science-oriented exhibits and activities. Another major attraction is Palm Beach, a landscaped white-sand beach with freshwater lagoons and offering children's activities. Moody Gardens also has a RideFilm Theater with motion-based pod seating, a 3-D IMAX theater, a paddlewheel cruise boat, a hotel and a convention center.

=== Transitional Learning Center ===
The Transitional Learning Center (TLC) is a facility that specializes solely in post-acute brain injury rehabilitation. It was started by the Foundation in 1982, in response to a brain injury suffered by a son of trustee Robert L. Moody. The center provides survivors of acute brain injury with rehabilitation services needed to help patients overcome their injuries and regain independence.

In addition to providing medical treatment and support, TLC is involved with extensive brain research programs and offers educational training programs for the medical field.

In 2005 the Foundation expended $38.1 million USD towards supporting and expanding the Transitional Learning Center and its programs.

=== Moody Scholars Program ===
The Moody Scholars Program was initiated by the Moody Foundation in 1969 to provide financial assistance to qualified high school students in their pursuit of an undergraduate degree in the state of Texas. Since then, the Foundation has awarded more than $15 million in scholarships to more than 5,000 Texas students to attend college via the Moody Scholars program.

=== Generation Moody Education Initiative ===
Generation Moody Education Initiative, an initiative led by the Moody Foundation, launched in early 2018 to create an educational attainment program for young students in the Galveston area. It unites Galveston's schools – both public and private – and the broader education community. With a vision of fostering educational growth to create an educational attainment program, Generation Moody offers grants to local programs focused on raising student achievement. Since early 2018, the Moody Foundation has awarded more than $28 million to local educational organizations aimed at increasing student success. Such organizations have helped students gain access to enriching after-school programs, develop technological literacy, bolster professional development and much more.

The initiative aims to provide evidence-based professional development, increase parent engagement, and increase academic enrichment through summer/after school programs and purposeful field trips. In addition, the organization has come up with factors to support their mission: add or expand on programs involving STEM, IT, and robotics as well as increasing local business involvement through job shadowing and guest speakers.

The Generation Moody Education Initiative also connects longstanding Moody Foundation projects such as the Moody Scholars program (c. 1969) and more recent endeavors like the Moody Early Childhood Education Center with new support for after-school, summer school and family literacy programs, new professional development initiatives as well as some targeted facility maintenance and upgrades.

=== Galveston Island Municipal Golf Course ===
In 2007, Moody Gardens, Inc. signed an agreement with the City of Galveston to completely rebuild the city's municipal golf course with a contribution from the Moody Foundation. It reopened in June 2008 under the moniker Moody Gardens Golf Course. It underwent a $17 million comprehensive renovation, including the addition of new turf grass, green complexes, elevations, irrigation, drainage, cart paths, greens and a full clubhouse renovation.

The new course was designed by Jacobsen Hardy Golf Course Design and was constructed to keep historical features of the course while improving certain holes and course flow. The par 72 course measures 6,900 yards from the back tees, with 5 sets of tees to accommodate all playing abilities.

=== Moody College of Communication ===
On November 7, 2013, a ceremony was held to celebrate the donation of $50 million from the Moody Foundation to the University of Texas at Austin College of Communication, changing its name to the Moody College of Communication and funding many new projects and college objectives. This is the largest donation in the college's history.

The Moody Pedestrian Bridge is one of a kind Inverted Fink Truss bridge completed in 2016. The bridge connects two buildings as part of the Moody College of Communication in University of Texas at Austin. It crosses over West Dean Keeton Street, a busy street that traverses the campus. It was funded by the Moody Foundation.

== Trustees ==
=== Current ===
- Frances Moody-Dahlberg, Chairman & Executive Director
- Ross R. Moody
- Elizabeth Moody

=== Former ===
- William Lewis (W.L.) Moody Jr.
- Libbie Rice Shearn Moody
- Mary Moody Northen
- Robert L. Moody Sr.
- Shearn Moody, Jr.

== See also ==
- Moody National Bank
- Moody Gardens
- American National Insurance Company
- Moody Center
- Moody Coliseum (Abilene Christian)
- Moody Coliseum (SMU)
