= Transitional Learning Center =

Brain injury rehabilitation facility in Galveston, Texas

- Company type: Non-profit organization
- Industry: Health care
- Founded: 1982
- Founder: Robert L. Moody
- Headquarters: Galveston, Texas, USA
- Website: http://www.tlcrehab.org/

The Transitional Learning Center (TLC) is a post-acute brain injury rehabilitation facility headquartered in the island city of Galveston, Texas. It was started by the non-profit Moody Foundation in 1982, in response to a brain injury suffered by a son of trustee Robert L. Moody. The center provides survivors of acute brain injury with rehabilitation services needed to help patients overcome their injuries and regain independence. In order to provide additional space for post-acute brain injury rehabilitation, in 2008 the center opened a branch facility in Lubbock, Texas, to help serve needs of people throughout the southwest United States. TLC Director of Neuropsychology, Dr. Dennis Zgaljardic, is a past president of the Houston Neuropsychological Society.

== Rehabilitation services ==
The center offers rehabilitation services for a wide range of acquired brain injuries, from traumatic brain injury to recovery from strokes. Services are provided by licensed therapists in the fields of neuropsychology, occupational therapy, physical therapy, speech and language therapy and therapeutic recreation. Currently TLC operates 40 inpatient rehabilitation beds at its Galveston headquarters and 16 inpatient beds at its Lubbock facility.

== Research ==
In addition to providing medical treatment and support, TLC is involved with extensive brain research programs and offers educational training programs for the medical field. Current research is focusing on five research areas; physical health, growth hormone and tbi, hypopituitarism, neuroendocrine and exercise, and neuropsychological testing In 2008 the center received part of a $33 million grant from the United States Department of Defense to help perform research into mild-brain injuries and concussions.

== Funding ==
The center is heavily dependent on grants from the Moody Foundation, receiving at least $2 million a year from the foundation to help with costs. As recently as 2005 the foundation expended $38.1 million USD towards supporting and expanding the Transitional Learning Center and its programs.

== Long term facilities ==
For patients who are unable to achieve a level of mobility that allows for independent living, TLC operates a 32-bed long-term assisted living facility under the name Tideway.

== Robert L. Moody Prize ==
The Robert L. Moody Prize, awarded by the Transitional Learning Center and The University of Texas Medical Branch (UTMB Health), has annually recognized distinguished contributions in brain injury rehabilitation and research since 2000. The prize has been presented in conjunction with the annual Galveston Brain Injury Conference, co-sponsored by the two organizations.

Recipients include:

- Robert L. Moody (2000)
- Mitchell Rosenthal (2001)
- Jeffrey S. Kreutzer (2002)
- Roberta DePompei (2003-2004)
- Marilyn Spivak (2005)
- Barbara Wilson (2006)
- John D. Corrigan (2007)
- John Whyte (2008)
- Wayne A. Gordon (2009)
- Sureyya S. Dikmen (2010)
- James F. Malec (2011)
- Keith D. Cicerone (2012)
- Jennie Ponsford (2013)
- Ross D. Zafonte (2014)
- Angela Colantonio (2015)
- Flora M. Hammond (2016)
- Joseph T. Giacino (2017)
- Mark Sherer (2018)
