= Douglas Caddy =

American attorney

Douglas Caddy (born March 23, 1938), is an American attorney who was briefly counsel for the five men arrested for the Watergate burglaries, as well as two other men involved in the Watergate scandal, E. Howard Hunt and Gordon Liddy.

== Background ==
Caddy was born in 1938. He was educated at Georgetown University School of Foreign Service (B.S. degree) and New York University School of Law (J.D. degree).

== Watergate ==
According to Caddy, he met Hunt at a public relations firm then became friends due to shared political views. He served as national director for Young Americans for Freedom and had volunteered for the Committee to Re-elect the President. Caddy said that he also provided routine legal work for Hunt.

Around 3 a.m. on the morning of June 17, 1972, Caddy stated that Hunt called him from an office in the Old Executive Office Building and said that they needed to talk. The two men met at Caddy's house where Hunt's predicament became evident. Caddy never spoke in court for Hunt, Liddy, or the five burglars. Inexperienced in criminal law, he enlisted the help of a criminal attorney to represent the five burglars. Liddy also retained Caddy's services on Hunt's advice.

Citing attorney–client privilege, Caddy refused to divulge to government investigators who arranged legal counsel for the burglars. Eleven days after the burglaries, Judge John Sirica of the United States District Court for the District of Columbia subpoenaed him to testify before a grand jury. Refusing to do so, he was found in contempt of court. Caddy alleged that judges and prosecutors attempted to manipulate him because he was gay. An appeals court eventually upheld his right to refuse to testify.

The character "Markham" in the 1976 film All the President's Men is based on Caddy.

== JFK assassination ==
Caddy claims that when he asked Howard Hunt why President John F. Kennedy was assassinated, Hunt told him it was because Kennedy was about to disclose 'the Alien Presence' to the Soviet Union.

== Later activities ==
As of 2005, Caddy was a private practice attorney in Houston, Texas.

== See also ==
Shearn Moody Jr.
