= Angela Colantonio =

Canadian occupational scientist

Angela Colantonio is a Canadian occupational scientist whose work involves improving screening, managing and treating people with traumatic brain injury, with a focus on people belonging to underserved populations. Colantonio is a professor of occupational science and occupational therapy at the University of Toronto, where she leads the Acquired Brain Injury Research Lab, and has a cross-appointment with the Dalla Lana School of Public Health. She is also the director of the University of Toronto's Rehabilitation Sciences Institute, and a senior scientist at the University Health Network's KITE-Toronto Rehabilitation Institute. In 2020, Colantonio was appointed as a Canada Research Chair (Tier 1) in Traumatic Brain Injury in Underserved Populations.

== Research ==
Colantonio's lab analyzed data from three men’s correctional facilities and one female facility, finding that almost half (43%) of Ontario prisoners have suffered at least one traumatic brain injury. Of those, 62% were men, while 37% were women. Colantonio's lab has also surveyed frontline workers, finding that even those who work directly with survivors may be unaware of the signs of traumatic brain injury.

In 2020, Colantonio was appointed as a Canada Research Chair (Tier 1) in Traumatic Brain Injury in Underserved Populations, where her research team is using gender-based analysis to improve traumatic brain injury screening, management and treatment for people exposed to partner violence, interacting with the justice system, or experiencing housing instability.

Colantonio co-chairs an international task force on girls and women with acquired brain injury, titled the Girls & Women with ABI Task Force.

== Selected academic publications ==
- Mollayeva, Tatyana, Shirin Mollayeva, and Angela Colantonio. "Traumatic brain injury: sex, gender and intersecting vulnerabilities." Nature Reviews Neurology 14.12 (2018): 711-722.
- Steadman-Pare, D., Colantonio, A., Ratcliff, G., Chase, S., & Vernich, L. (2001). Factors associated with perceived quality of life many years after traumatic brain injury. The Journal of Head Trauma Rehabilitation, 16(4), 330-342.
- Cohen, C. A., Colantonio, A., & Vernich, L. (2002). Positive aspects of caregiving: rounding out the caregiver experience. International journal of geriatric psychiatry, 17(2), 184-188.
