= William Lewis Moody Jr. =

American financier and entrepreneur

- Born: William Lewis Moody Jr. January 25, 1865; Fairfield, Texas, USA
- Died: July 21, 1954 (aged 89); Galveston, Texas, U.S.
- Resting place: Galveston, Texas, U.S. 29°16′52″N 94°49′33″W
- Education: Virginia Military Institute
- Alma mater: University of Texas, Austin
- Occupations: Insurance and banking executive
- Years active: 1886–1954
- Known for: Financial and philanthropic endeavors
- Predecessor: William Lewis Moody Sr.
- Successor: Mary Moody Northen
- Spouse: Libbie Shearn Rice Moody
- Children: 4, including Mary Moody Northen
- Parent(s): Pherabe Elizabeth (Bradley); William Lewis Moody Sr.
- Relatives: Shearn Moody Jr. (grandson)

William Lewis Moody Jr. (January 25, 1865 – July 21, 1954) was an American financier and entrepreneur from Galveston, Texas, who founded a private bank, an insurance company, and one of the largest charitable foundations in the United States. Moody was active in the day-to-day operations of his companies until two days before his death.

== Personal life ==
Moody's parents were Col. William Lewis Moody and Pherabe Elizabeth Moody, née Bradley. Moody was born on January 25, 1865, in Fairfield, Texas. After attending boarding schools in Virginia, he attended Virginia Military Institute in Lexington, Virginia. Following that, he studied law at the University of Texas before going to work at his father's cotton business in Galveston in 1886.

On August 26, 1890, Moody married Libbie Rice Shearn. They had four children:Mary Elizabeth (who married Edwin Clyde Northen), William Lewis III, Shearn, and Libbie (who married Clark W. Thompson). Their family home, "The Moody Mansion", is now a museum. Mary later took over many of the family businesses after Moody's death.

== Business interests ==
In 1889, Moody set up the private bank W. L. Moody and Company,. In 1905, he founded American National Insurance Company, which, at the time of Moody's death, was the biggest one west of the Mississippi River.

In 1907, Moody founded City National Bank. He was President of the bank until he died. In 1953, the bank's name was changed to Moody National Bank in his honor.

Moody's business interests also included ventures outside of the financial arena. In 1923 Moody purchased the Galveston Daily News, the oldest newspaper in Texas, from Alfred H. Belo. He later expanded his media interests by acquiring the Galveston Tribune.

In 1930, Moody founded the National Hotel Company. His holdings at one time included the Galvez Hotel in Galveston and the Menger Hotel in San Antonio, Texas. In 1931, the company took control of a financially troubled Conrad Hilton's hotels, hiring Hilton to help manage the company. The merger later ended with Hilton taking back some of the hotels he had brought to the group.

== Legacy ==
In 1942, Moody and his wife set up the Moody Foundation, to which a significant portion of Moody's estate was transferred after his death. The Foundation awards grants to various civic and environmental causes in Texas. The Moodys' daughter Mary helped run the foundation from its inception until her death in 1986, and members of the family are still involved. Today the Moody Foundation has grown into a $2.9 billion USD charitable foundation, making grants throughout the state of Texas.

The Moody Foundation purchased naming rights for Moody Coliseum in University Park, Texas, as well as Moody Towers on the University of Houston campus. The Foundation provided $1 million (equivalent to $10.2 million today) for the 1965 construction of the William L. Moody, Jr., Engineering Building (since demolished) on the campus of Trinity University in San Antonio. Texas A&M University Press publishes a series of books called the "W. L. Moody Jr. Natural History Series". At Rice University, one of the endowed chairs is for the W. L. Moody Jr. Professor of Mathematics, currently held by Robert Hardt; past holders include Morton L. Curtis.

In 2011, the Foundation donated $2.5 million for the naming rights at the new home of the long-running "Austin City Limits" series on PBS, located across the street from City Hall in downtown Austin. The venue's formal name is "Austin City Limits Live at The Moody Theater," but is informally known as "ACL Live."

On October 21, 2013, it was announced that the Foundation gave a $50 million gift to the University of Texas at Austin to name the college of communication the Moody College of Communication.

Additionally, on November 12, 2019, the Foundation announced a $100 million donation to Southern Methodist University to establish the Moody School of Graduate and Advanced Studies.

Further, on August 20, 2021, the Moody Amphitheater – an outdoor music venue constructed in conjunction with Austin's Waterloo Greenway park, where it sits along its northern end – made its debut with a performance by renowned Austin musician Gary Clark Jr.

Finally, the Moody Center – located on the southeast edge of the University of Texas at Austin campus, just north of downtown Austin – was completed in April 2022 and was dedicated by Matthew McConaughey. The $130 million donated to the project by the Moody Foundation stands as the largest private donation in UT's history from a foundation. The 5,000-seat venue has hosted a number of high-profile musicians: Harry Styles selected it for a five-night residency as part of his 2022 world tour.

On Friday, September 19, 2025, it was announced that Huston-Tillotson University had received the single largest donation to an HBCU with $150 million gift from the Moody Foundation.

== Gallery ==
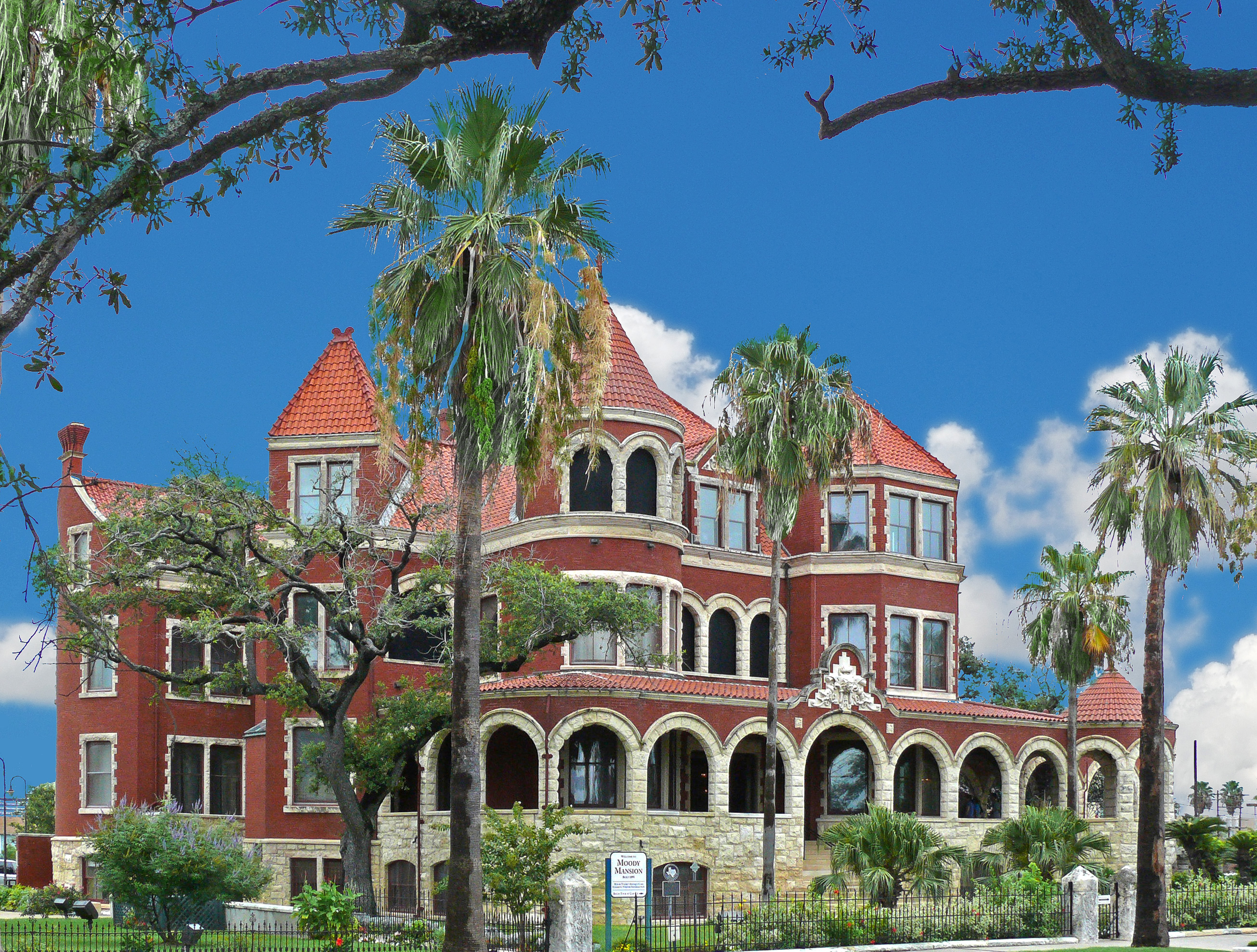
Moody's home, now preserved as a house museum.

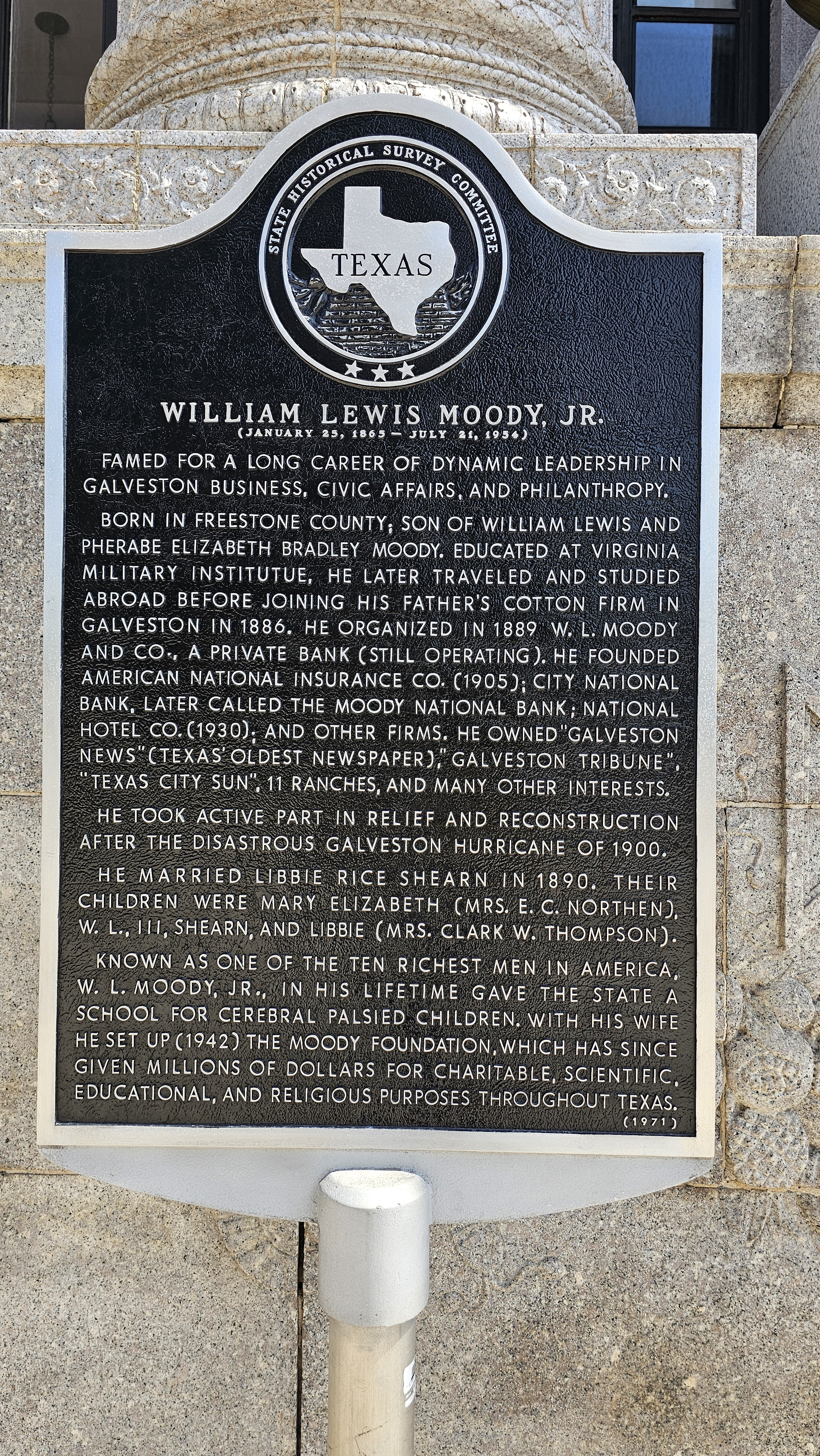

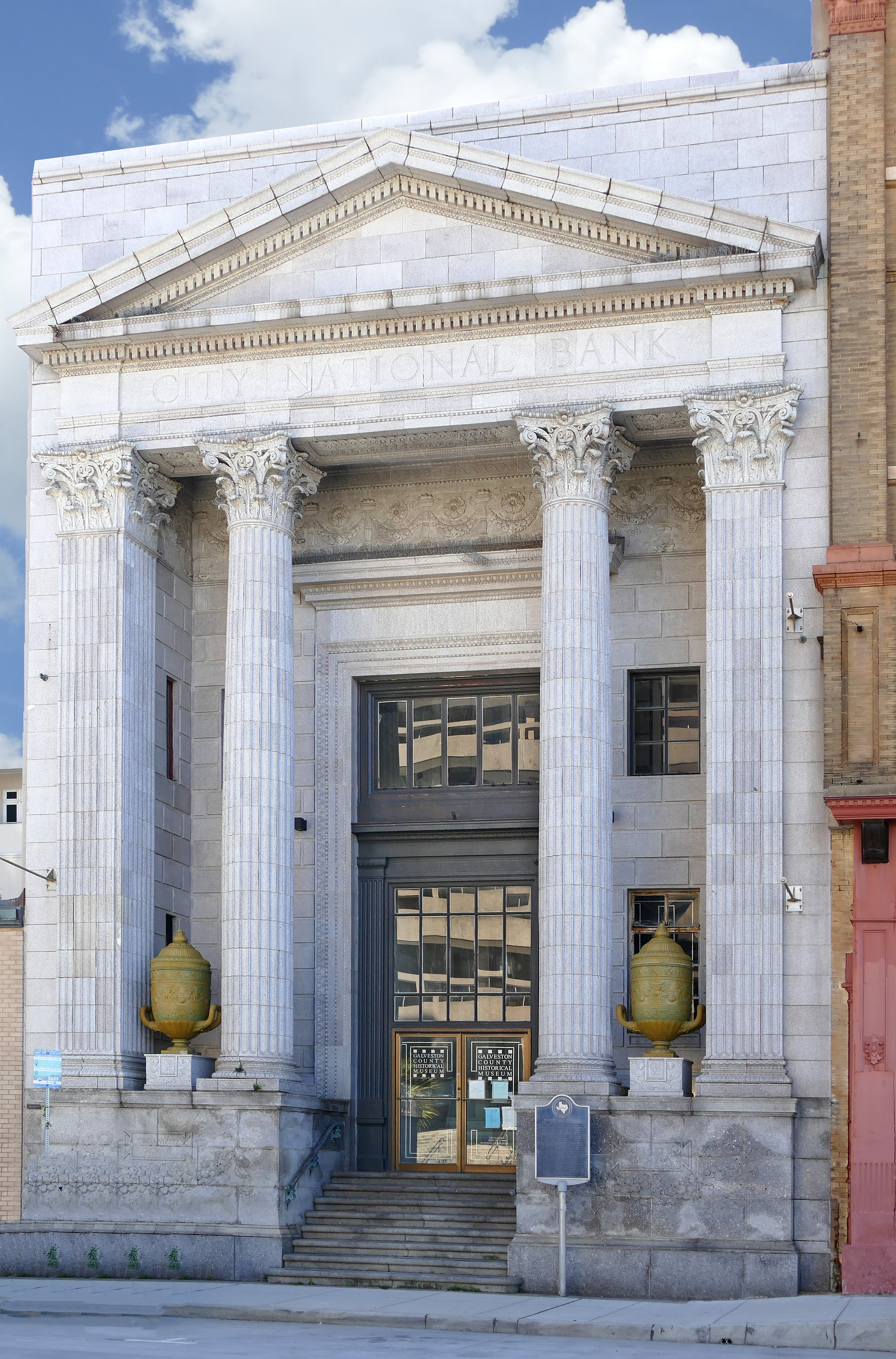
City National Bank Building, founded by Lewis Moody

== See also ==
- Moody Gardens
