= Moody Mansion =

Historic house in Texas, United States

- Willis-Moody Mansion
- U.S. National Register of Historic Places
- Recorded Texas Historic Landmark
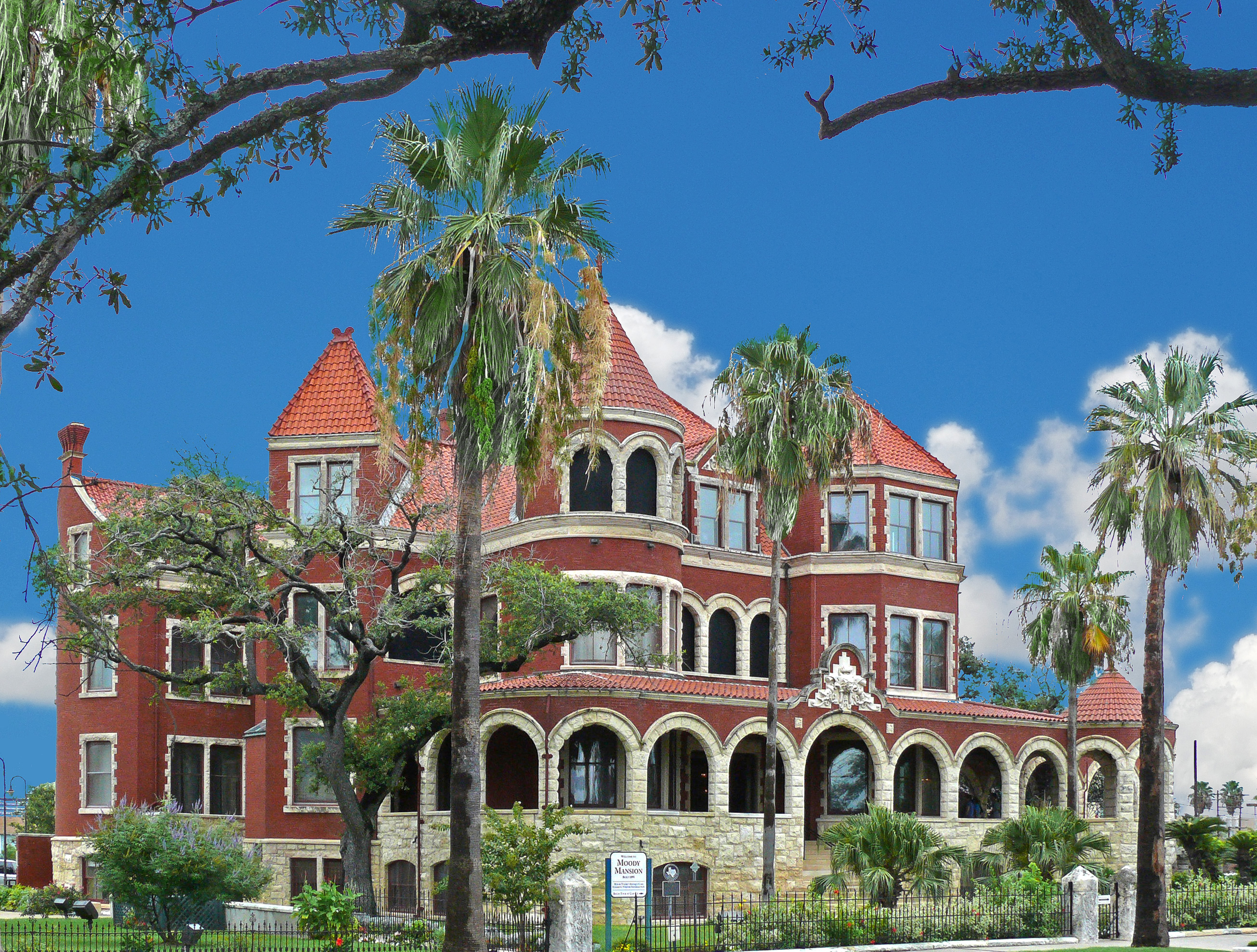
- Moody Home taken in 2012

- Location within Texas Location within the United States
- Location: 2618 Broadway Ave., Galveston, Texas
- Coordinates: 29°17′57″N 94°47′46″W
- Area: less than one acre
- Built: 1893
- Architect: William H. Tyndall
- Architectural style: Romanesque
- Website: Moody Mansion
- NRHP reference No.: 94000410
- RTHL No.: 7534

Significant dates
- Added to NRHP: May 13, 1994
- Designated RTHL: 1967

The Moody Mansion, also known as the Willis-Moody Mansion, is a historic residential building in Galveston, Texas located at 2618 Broadway Avenue. The thirty-one room Romanesque mansion was completed in 1895. The home is named for William Lewis Moody, Jr., an American financier and entrepreneur in the cotton business who bought the home from Galveston socialite Narcissa Willis. The mansion was added to the National Register of Historic Places on May 13, 1994. Tours are offered, and the facilities can be rented out for weddings and other events.

== Construction and history ==
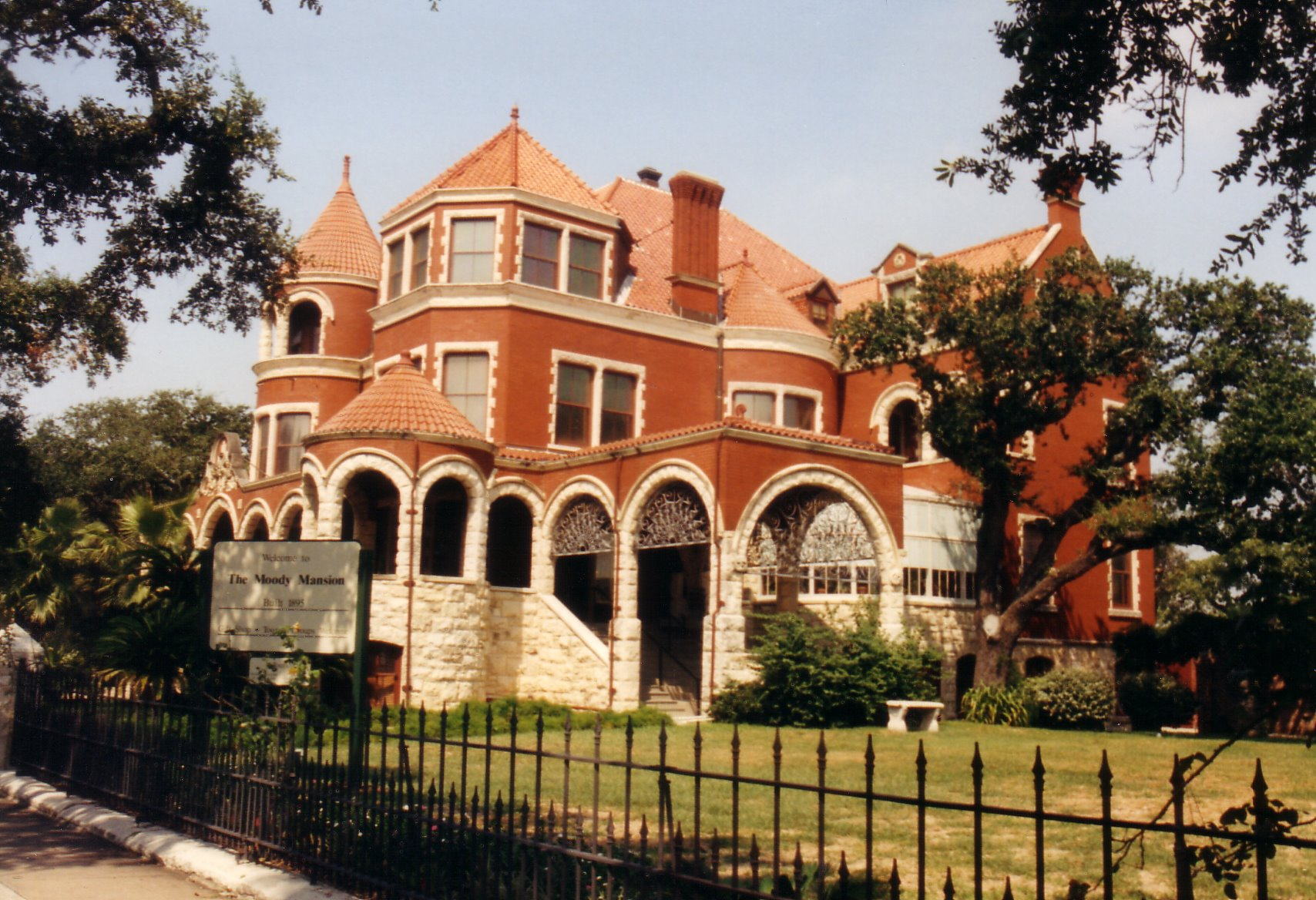

The mansion was commissioned by Galveston socialite Narcissa Willis in 1893. Throughout her life, Willis had asked her husband, entrepreneur and cotton broker Richard S. Willis, to build a grand home. Willis demurred as he preferred to keep his assets liquid to be distributed among his ten children on his death. After Richard Willis' died in 1892, Narcissa had the home she and her husband shared torn down and began plans to build a more opulent home on the site. For this act, Willis was estranged from her family until her death in 1899. Her children never visited the opulent mansion designed to bring them back to Galveston. Willis lived alone in the house with a single housekeeper who was paid $1,000 a year, three times the wages domestics earned at the time.

Willis commissioned an English architect, William H. Tyndall, to design the home. Following the style of Richard Norman Shaw, Tyndall used elements from different cultures and periods, leading to an eclectic appearance. The interiors were designed by Pottier & Stymus, a famous New York firm of the time that also worked for such clients as Thomas Edison, William Rockefeller, and President Ulysses S. Grant.

Upon Narcissa Willis' death in 1899, her daughter Beatrice put the home up for sale. Libbie Moody, who lived in a home nearby the mansion, asked her husband, William Lewis Moody, Jr., to put in a bid for the mansion. After the Hurricane of 1900 devastated Galveston that September, many of the bidders pulled out of the sale. Moody won the mansion for $20,000, a fraction of the mansion's over $100,000 worth. Moody, his wife and four children promptly moved into the home and celebrated their first Christmas at the mansion in 1900.

Members of the Moody family resided in the home until 1986 when it was turned into a historic museum commemorating the Moody family. Hurricanes continue to affect the history of the home. In September 2008, Hurricane Ike led to the flooding of the basement. Libbie Moody's potting room and the period kitchen were lost. As of July 2014, the basement was opened as the Galveston Children's Museum.

== Layout ==
The home has thirty-one rooms and five bathrooms. Tyndall incorporated many technological advances of the period including a one-passenger elevator, a dumbwaiter, speaking tubes in the pantry for communicating with the kitchen staff in the basement, heated drying racks in the laundry room, and lighting fixtures using both gas and electricity. The house also has its own rainwater cistern.

The home has four floors. The basement which contained the servant's quarters and kitchen is on the ground floor.

=== First floor ===
- Entryway - The entryway is decorated with oak paneling of a classical design derived from the Doric order. Above the stairway is a stained-glass window espousing themes of welcome. As the window stands in an alcove formed by the front and back sides of the house it has been well protected from the elements and was only removed once when Mary Moody had the stained-glass re-leaded.
- Parlor - The parlor is in an 18th-century French style and is the most opulent room in the house with gold on blue-grey silk wall coverings and gold-decorated plaster friezes. Despite its grandeur, guests did not often stay in this room for long as the Moodys preferred to entertain in the less formal library. In 1983 Hurricane Alicia caused extensive water damage to this room. Ten years and ten million dollars later, this room was able to be reopened.
- Library - The library is in Empire Revival style. It has pink silk wall coverings decorated with rosettes. Rosettes can also be found in the lighting fixtures and on the door and window casings. The book cases only extend halfway up the wall to invite accessibility and also to facilitate personal decoration of the room.
- Ballroom - The ballroom was still unfinished upon Narcissa Willis' death. After the Moodys purchased the home, they used it as a junk room. As Mary Moody, the oldest daughter, approached her 18th birthday, Libbie Moody entreated her husband to repair the room for their daughter's debut party. William Moody, Jr. accepted bids for the room, coming in as low as $6,000. However, ever conservative with his money, decided to finish the room by himself. The flooring was pine, purchased from Sears & Roebuck. The friezes were created from molds. The only item purchased for the room was a mirror. Four years after her coming-out party, Mary Moody and Edwin Clyde Northen were married in this room.
- Conservatory - Libbie Moody enjoyed growing ferns in the conservatory. During parties, musicians would play from the conservatory.
- Dining Room - The dining room is in Beaux Arts style with mahogany paneling. The ceiling is coffered and quite heavy. Hidden steel railroad beams support the ceiling. The bas-relief above the fireplace depicts hunters and hounds. While it appears hand-carved it is actually painted plaster.
- Pantry
- Children's Dining Room - Narcissa Willis designed this room for children and grandchildren who had yet to learn proper Victorian table manners. However, Libbie Moody found the room too small, and all meals in the Moody household were taken in the dining room.
- Living Room - The living room is in Colonial Revival style.

=== Second floor ===
- Libbie's Room (Infirmary Room) - This room was designed for those sick with fever, common in the 19th century. Both the airways and the fireplace of this room are separate from those of the rest of the house. This room has its own restroom. As a child Libbie Moody asked her father if she could paint the wood in her room in a lighter color because she found the dark wood too oppressive. She received her father's permission, and therefore the wood in this room is lighter than that in the others.
- Mary's Room
- Bathroom - This bathroom connects Mary's room with the Master Bedroom. It contains a toilet and a bidet. The tub has two fixtures for showering, one with a single spout and the other with a rainfall shower head, a feature unique to this bathroom.
- Master Bedroom
- Nursery Room - This room was never used as intended, but the physical features of the room allow for an understanding of its original purpose. The fireplace has small recesses on each side for warming bottles of milk, and there is a tub in this room on a raised dais of two steps that allows a nursemaid to survey the room and other potential trouble-making children while washing a baby.
- William's Room
- Shearn's Room
- Sewing Room - This room was also used as a guest room and as a sleeping room for William Lewis Moody, Jr. during the summer months when his family was up north in Virginia. This room has its own bathroom.

=== Third floor ===
- Four additional guest rooms
- Auditorium
- Additional Storage

== See also ==
- National Register of Historic Places listings in Galveston County, Texas
- Recorded Texas Historic Landmarks in Galveston County
