= Moody National Bank =

American nationally chartered bank

Coordinates: 29.3047°N 94.7938°W

- Type: Private
- Industry: Banking; Financial services Investment services
- Founded: September 30, 1907
- Founder: William Lewis Moody, Jr.
- Headquarters: Galveston, Texas, U.S.
- Number of locations: 16 branches
- Area served: Southeast Texas, Central Texas
- Key people: Robert L. Moody, Chairman Emeritus; Victor Pierson, Chairman, President & CEO; Craig Barker, Executive Vice President
- Products: Finance; Consumer Banking; Corporate Banking; Wealth Management; Mortgage loans Loans; Trust services
- Operating income: 11.382 million USD
- Net income: 11.397 million USD
- Total assets: $1.54 billion USD (June 30, 2026)
- Total equity: $148.2M USD
- Owner: Moody Bancshares, Inc.
- Number of employees: 210
- Website: MoodyBank.com

Moody National Bank (MNB) is a nationally chartered bank, founded in 1907, that is based in Galveston, Texas.

With assets of nearly $1.7 billion, Moody Bank is one of the oldest and largest privately owned Texas-based banks. Its trust department, established in 1927, administers over $26 billion in assets, and is the largest domiciled in the state of Texas. The company offers a full range of commercial and consumer banking products, as well as trust and investment banking services to customers throughout Southeast Texas and Central Texas, including the Greater Houston area.

The bank is unique in that through its trust department, it has de facto control of the American National Insurance Company (ANICO), one of the largest life and property/casualty companies in the U.S. The bank's trust department administers the Moody Foundation and the Libbie Shearn Moody Trust, which together own the majority of ANICO's shares.

Moody National Bank is a wholly owned subsidiary of Moody Bancshares, Inc., a privately owned financial holding company, also based in Galveston. Moody Bancshares also maintains a controlling interest in Galveston-based Hometown Bank N.A.

== History ==
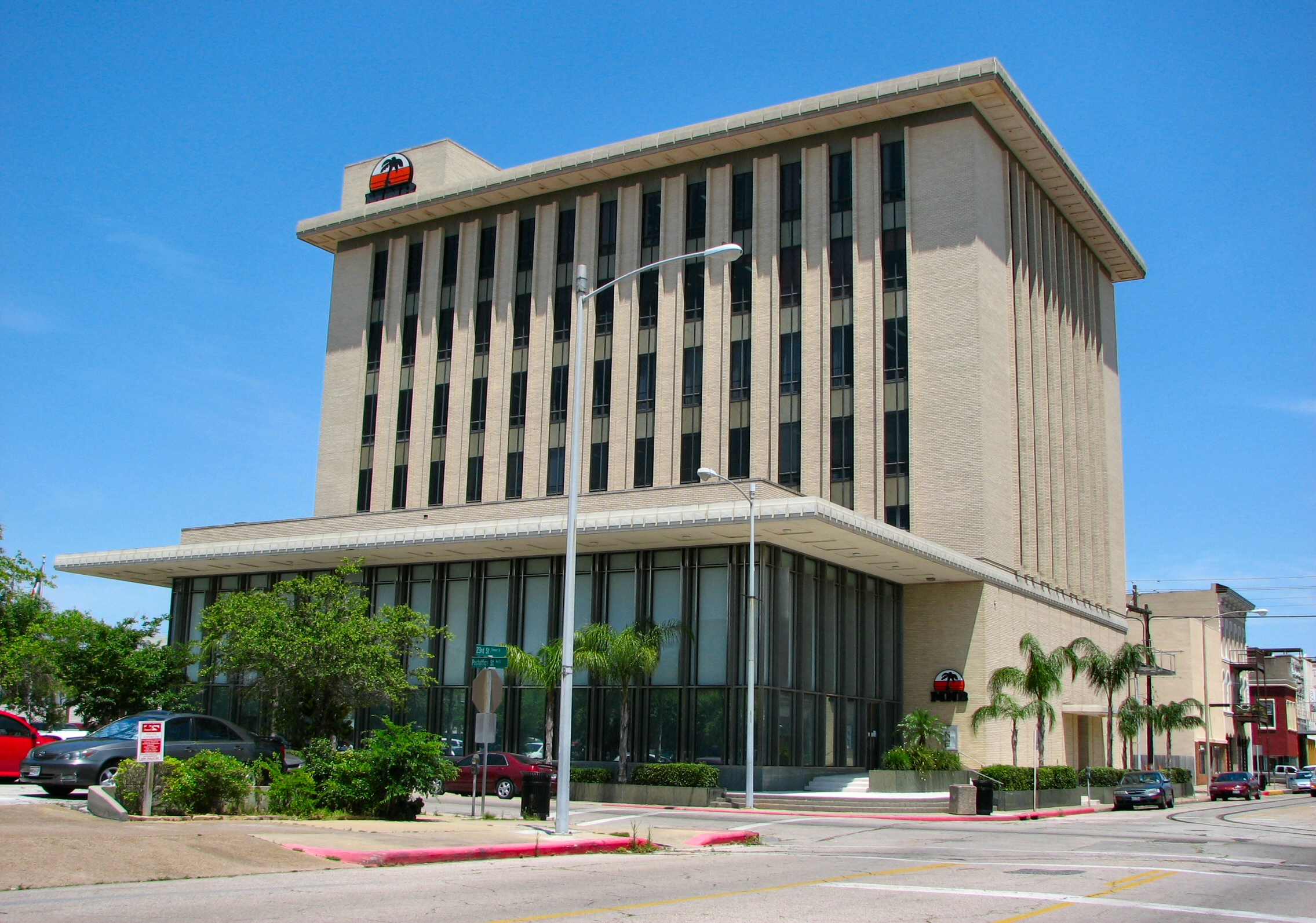
Moody National Bank's headquarters in downtown Galveston, Texas.

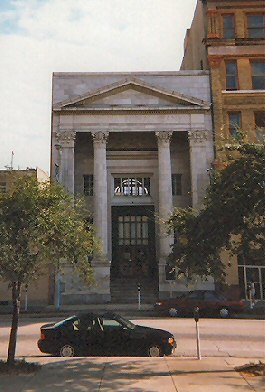
City National Bank Building, now the Galveston County Historical Museum, in downtown Galveston, Texas

In 1907, Galveston businessman William Lewis Moody, Jr. founded the City National Bank in the Trust Building in downtown Galveston. The new bank quickly grew and by 1920 a new building was constructed a block away on Market Street.

During its early years the City National Bank merged with the Galveston National Bank and continued to steadily grow in size and assets. In 1953 the board of directors decided to honor the bank's founder by changing the name to Moody National Bank. A year later Mr. Moody died and his daughter, Mary Moody Northen assumed control of the bank and ANICO.

By 1962 the bank had outgrown its neo-classical headquarters on Market Street, and a new seven-story building was constructed a block away. The old building, after sitting vacant for several years, was donated in 1972 by Ms. Northen to Galveston County for use as a historical museum dedicated to the memory of her father.

With the legalization of branch banking in Texas in 1988, Moody National Bank merged with sister bank, South Shore National Bank in League City, Texas. South Shore National Bank had been established by the Moody Family to provide financial services to the South Shore Harbor subdivision, which was being developed by their family controlled insurance company, the American National Insurance Company.

By the 2000s MNB began to spread out from its traditional base of Galveston County opening offices in Brazoria, Fort Bend, Harris and Travis counties.

== Banking center locations ==
Moody National Bank operates 16 financial centers across Central and Southeast Texas in the following counties:

- Brazoria County
- Comal County
- Fort Bend County
- Galveston County
- Harris County
- Travis County
