= Moody Coliseum =

Arena at Southern Methodist University

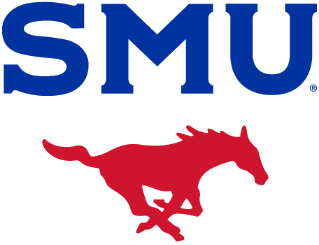

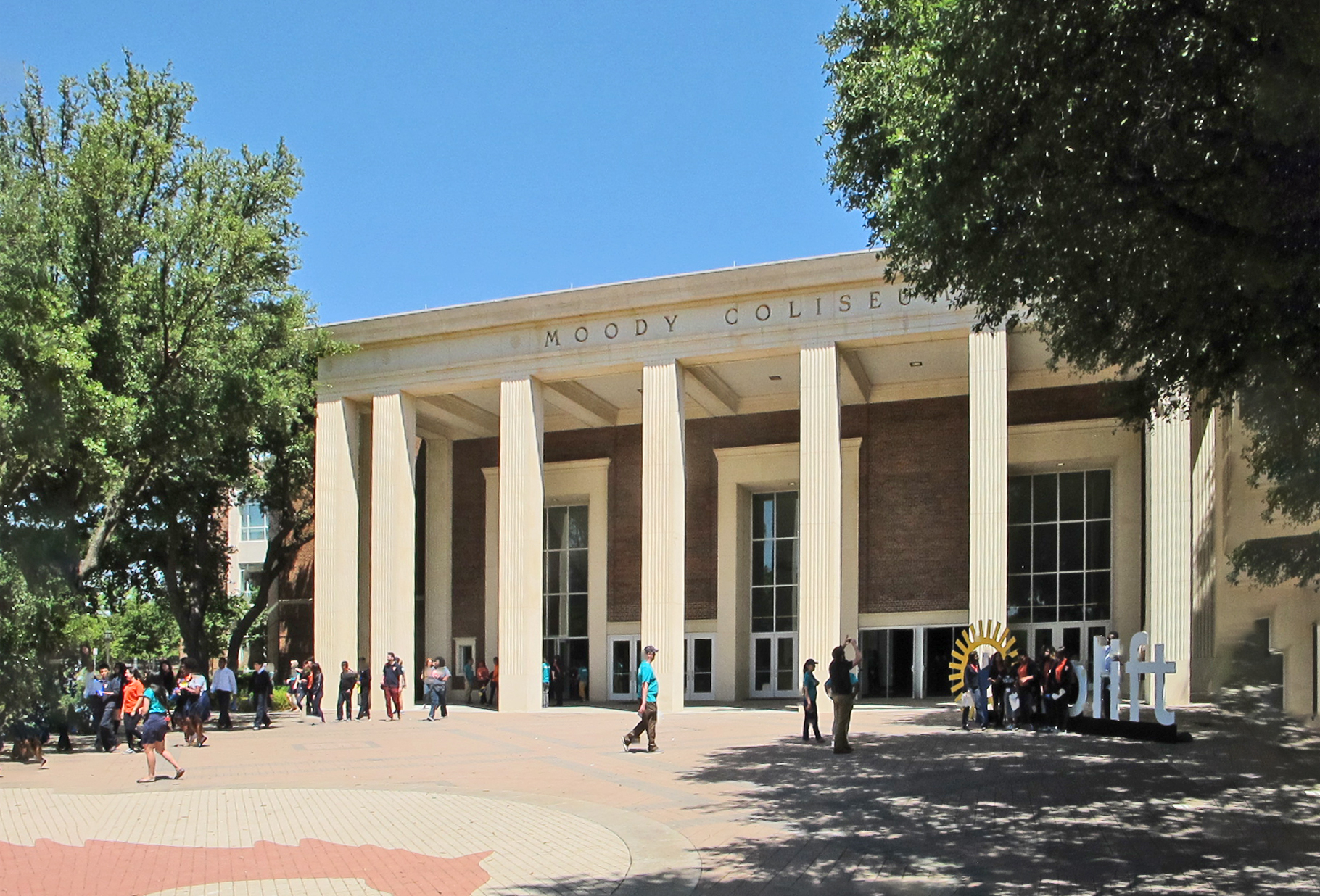
- Interactive map of Moody Coliseum
- Former names: SMU Coliseum (1956–1965)
- Location: 6024 Airline Road; University Park, Texas 75205 United States
- Coordinates: 32°50′25″N 96°46′50″W
- Owner: Southern Methodist University
- Operator: Southern Methodist University
- Capacity: 7,000 (2013–present); 8,998 (2000–2013); 9,007 (1983–2000); 8,900 (1972–1983); 9,305 (1956–1972)

Construction
- Groundbreaking: 1954
- Opened: December 3, 1956
- Renovated: 2014
- Cost: $2.5 million ($29.6 million in 2025 dollars) $40 million (renovations)
- Architect: HKS, Inc.

Tenants
- SMU Mustangs (NCAA) (1956–present); Dallas/Texas Chaparrals (ABA) (1967–1973); Dallas Diamonds (WBL) (1980–1981)

Moody Coliseum is a 7,000-seat multi-purpose arena in University Park, Texas (an inner suburb of Dallas). The arena opened in 1956. It is home to the Southern Methodist University Mustangs basketball teams and volleyball team. It was also home to the Dallas/Texas Chaparrals of the American Basketball Association before they moved to San Antonio, Texas, as the San Antonio Spurs. It was also later the home for the Dallas Diamonds of the Women's Professional Basketball League.

Moody Coliseum has been the home of SMU basketball since December 3, 1956, when the Mustangs defeated McMurry, 113–36. Moody has hosted Mustang Volleyball since the program's inception in 1996.

It was also home to the Dallas Mavericks on April 26, 1984, for Game 5 of their Western Conference quarterfinal series against the Seattle SuperSonics, locally referred to as "Moody Madness". The Mavericks won the game in overtime, 105–104. Less than 48 hours later, the Mavs lost Game 1 of the Western Conference semifinals to the Los Angeles Lakers by 43 points en route to a 4–1 series loss.

The Coliseum has undergone several changes in the past to modernize the facility. In 1980–81, the newly remodeled E. O. ("Doc") Hayes Memorial Dressing Room was opened. In 1984, a new scoreboard was installed over the center circle and new chairback seats were built at floor level on the north side. In 1985, more chairback seats were added, this time in the west end. The original wood floor of Moody Coliseum was replaced with a new wood surface and new lighting was installed in August 1986. In 1996, the court was redesigned to mark SMU's entry into one of the premier basketball leagues in America, the Western Athletic Conference.

In December 2006, a brand new $1 million video board was installed. In addition, in the summer of 2007, the hardwood court was redesigned, with a new color scheme and midcourt logo for the Mustangs. In 2013 major renovations were made for the upcoming 2014 season, their first in the newly formed American Conference and with their new coach, legend Larry Brown. Renovations included new concourses, lighting, seats, luxury boxes, Wi-Fi capability, floor color scheme, and a LED scoreboard with LED signage around the arena. Cost of renovations this time topped the $40 million range.

== History ==
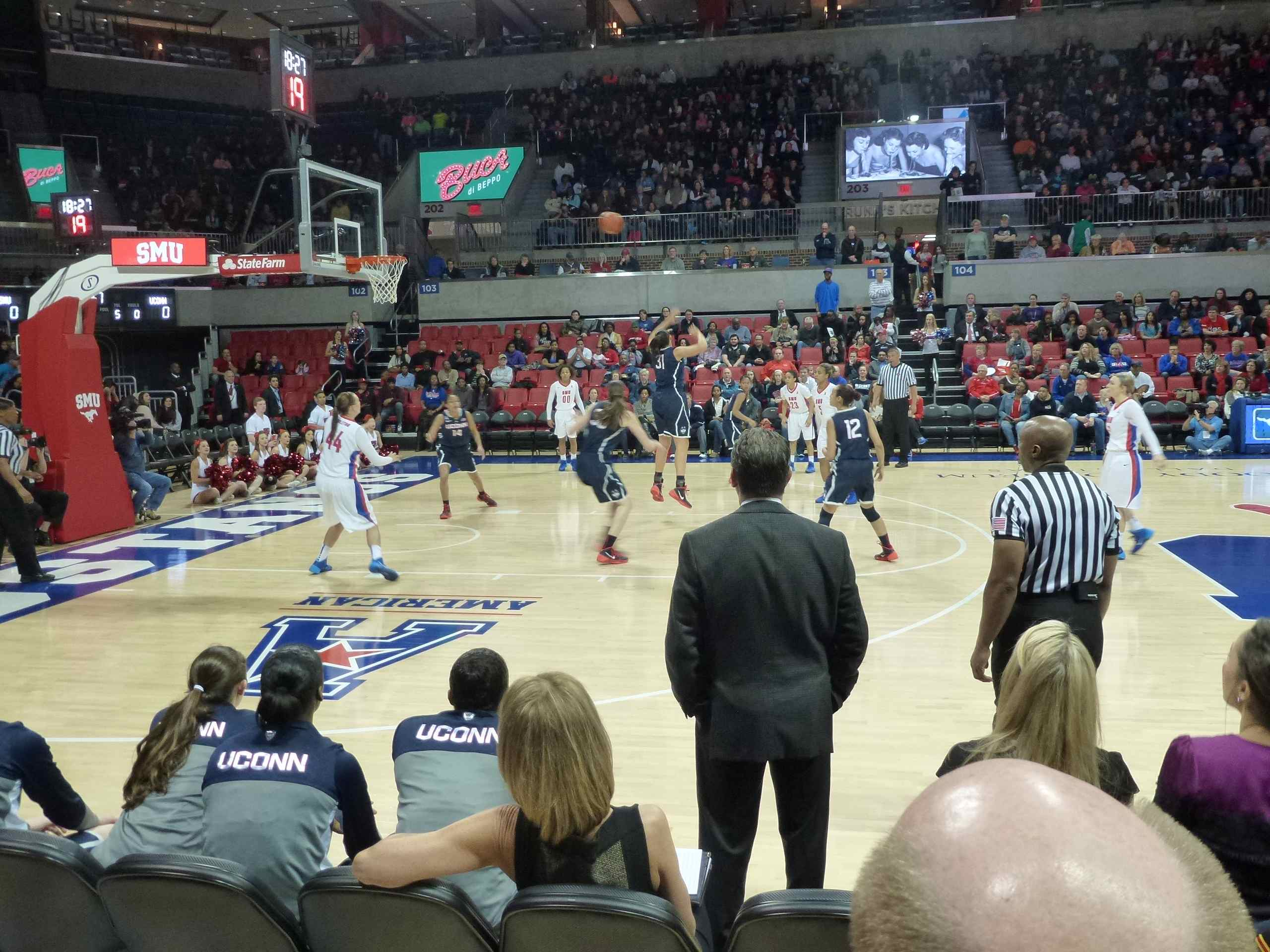
Moody Coliseum SMU versus UConn on February 25, 2014. The attendance was 4,091, a record for a women's basketball game.

- When the building was opened in 1956, it was known simply as the SMU Coliseum. In 1965, the arena was renamed Moody Coliseum in memory of William Lewis Moody Jr. of Galveston.
- The Coliseum is used for myriad events, including NCA Cheer & dance team, and basketball camps throughout the summer. Several concerts and other sporting events have been held at Moody Coliseum in recent years. In the spring of 1992, President George H. W. Bush addressed SMU's seniors during their graduation ceremony at Moody Coliseum.
- Bob Dylan performed at Moody Coliseum in September 1965. The performance was marked by Dylan first performing as an acoustic solo artist, followed by an intermission. When he returned to the stage following the intermission, he was backed by the Paul Butterfield Blues Band.
- The Rolling Stones played Moody Coliseum during their Fall 1969 tour of the United States.
- Moody Coliseum was the site of the Southwest Conference Post-Season Classic in 1976 and hosted NCAA Regional tournament games, the World Championship of Tennis Finals, the Virginia Slims of Dallas tennis championship, the Rolex National Indoor Intercollegiate Tennis Championships, the McDonald's High School All-American All-Star Game and the NABC College Basketball All-Star Game during the 1986 Final Four held in Dallas.
- The Grateful Dead performed at Moody Coliseum on October 15th, 1977.
- The largest crowds ever at Moody Coliseum have been 10,276 vs. Texas A&M and 10,091 vs. Texas, both in 1979. Changes in the seating arrangement in recent years have reduced the seating capacity to 9,007 and as of the 2000–2001 season, to 8,998.
- The largest crowd for a women's basketball game is 4,091, which occurred when top-ranked Connecticut played on February 25, 2014.

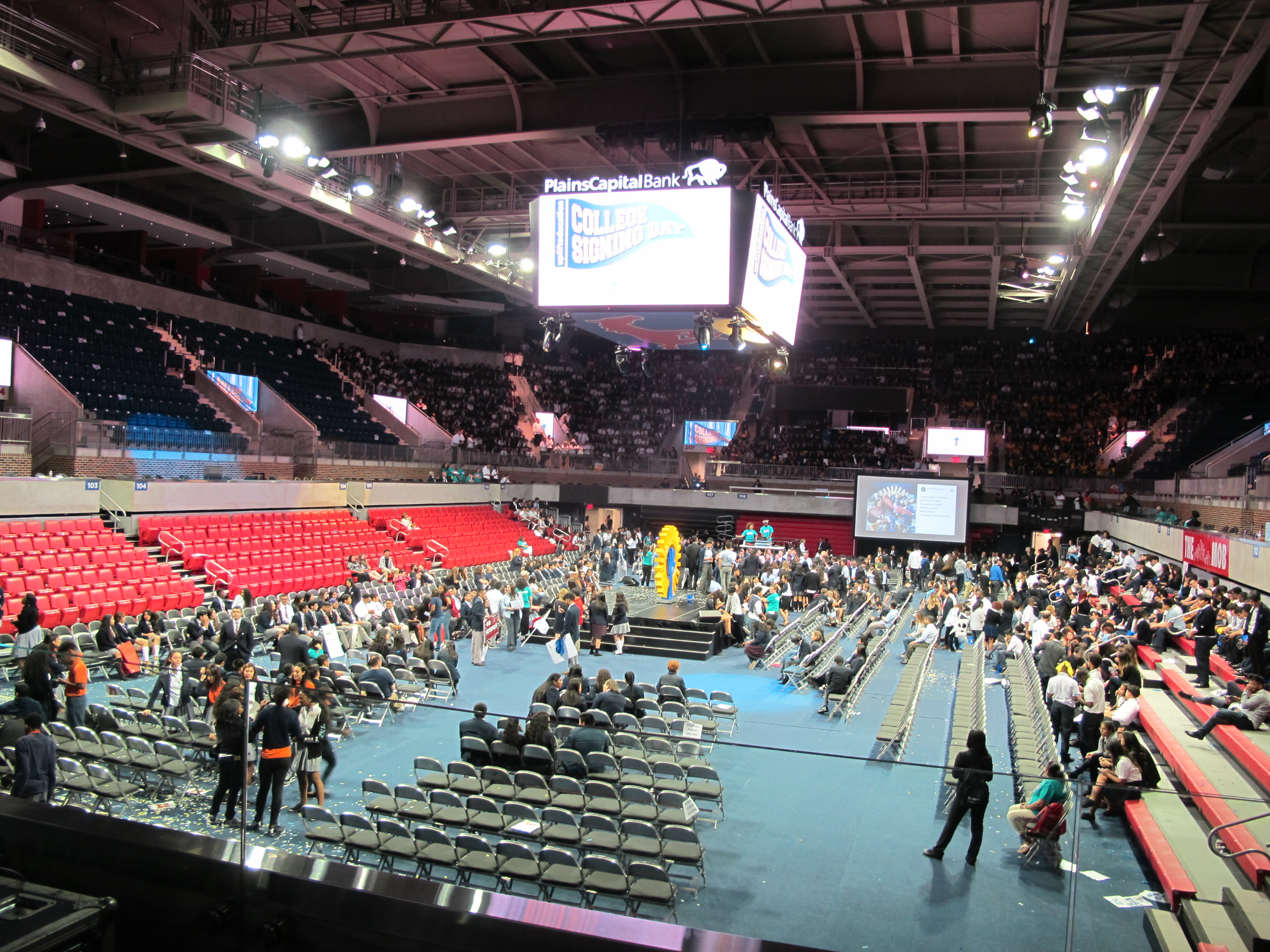
SMU's Moody Coliseum Interior, 2016

== See also ==
- List of NCAA Division I basketball arenas

Preceded by first arena	Home of the Dallas Chaparrals; 1967–1973	Succeeded by HemisFair Arena
