= Journal of Head Trauma Rehabilitation =

- Discipline: Neurology; Rehabilitation medicine Traumatology
- Language: English
- Edited by: John D. Corrigan

Publication details
- History: 1986–present
- Publisher: Wolters Kluwer
- Frequency: Bimonthly
- Impact factor: 3.406 (2017)

Standard abbreviations
- ISO 4: J. Head Trauma Rehabil.

Indexing
- CODEN: JHRHE
- ISSN: 0885-9701 (print); 1550-509X (web)
- LCCN: sf95095421
- OCLC no.: 803083154

Links
- Journal homepage; Online access; Online archive

The Journal of Head Trauma Rehabilitation is a bimonthly peer-reviewed medical journal covering rehabilitation medicine as it relates to head injuries. It was established in 1986 and is published by Wolters Kluwer. It the official journal of the Brain Injury Association of America. The editor-in-chief is John D. Corrigan (Ohio State University). According to the Journal Citation Reports, the journal has a 2017 impact factor of 3.406, ranking it 6th out of 65 journals in the category "Rehabilitation" and 61st out of 197 in the category "Clinical Neurology".
