= Moody Gardens =

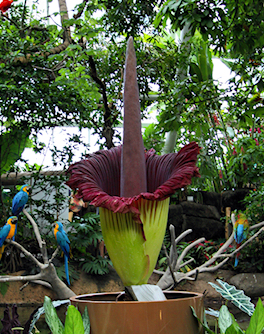
- A Titan arum at Moody Gardens
- Interactive map of Moody Gardens
- 29.2741°N 94.8513°W
- Date opened: 1986
- Location: Galveston, Texas, United States
- Land area: 242 acres (98 ha)
- No. of animals: over 9,000
- Annual visitors: 2 million per year (open 365 days)
- Memberships: Association of Zoos and Aquariums
- Owner: City of Galveston, run by Moody Foundation
- Website: www.moodygardens.com

Moody Gardens, established in 1986 by The Moody Foundation, is a non-profit attraction in Galveston, Texas.

Moody Gardens features three main pyramid attractions: the Aquarium Pyramid, the Rainforest Pyramid, and the Discovery Pyramid. Palm Beach, a seasonal summer attraction, features white sand imported from Florida and many common water-park activities.

In 2004, the site opened its expanded facilities which offer roughly 60,000 square feet of space for exhibition and business purposes.

The owners commissioned a landscape design from Geoffrey Jellicoe. It is described in Gardens of the Mind: the Genius of Geoffrey Jellicoe by Michael Spens (Antique Collectors Club, 1992).

== Aquarium Pyramid ==
This blue pyramid, opened in 1999, is approximately 12 stories high. The pools in the pyramid contain approximately 10,000 marine animals, including fish, sharks, seals, and penguins. The aquarium aims to highlight the importance of conservation of the world's oceans by representing animals from different regions of the sea, including the North Pacific, South Pacific, South Atlantic, and Caribbean.

The exhibit closed for a short period of time for renovations before reopening in 2017. Upon reopening, the Aquarium pyramid featured a 1.5 million gallon tank.

== Rainforest Pyramid ==
Rainforest Pyramid
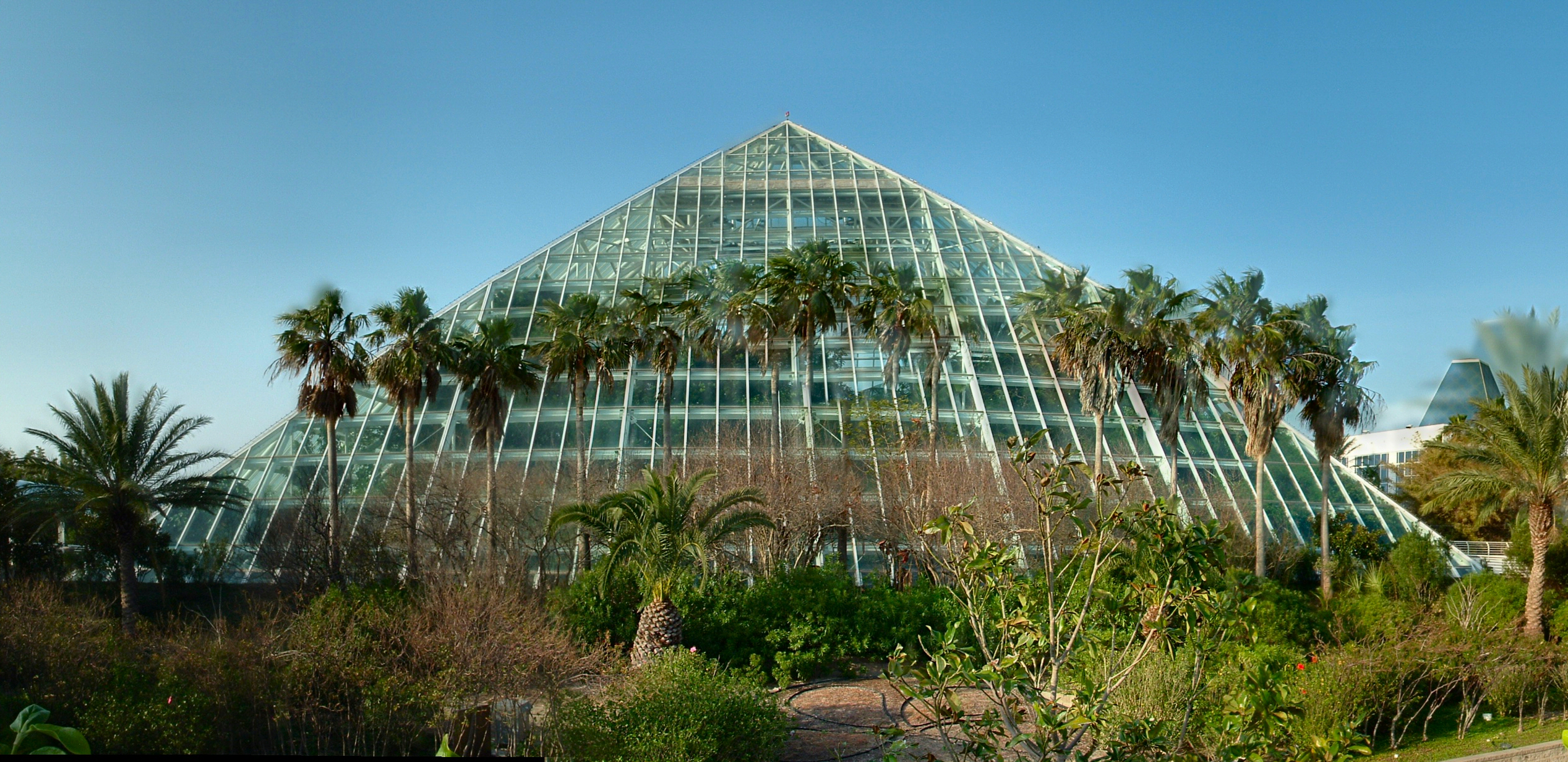
- Moody Gardens' Rainforest Pyramid
- Interactive map of Rainforest Pyramid
- Type: indoor rainforest
- Area: entire interior
- Operator: Moody Foundation
- Visitors: 2 million per year
- Status: open 365 days
- Plants: trees, bushes, flowers
- Species: 1,000 plant species plus animals
- Collections: exotic plants, plus otters, monkeys, alligators, bats, ocelots and birds

The Rainforest pyramid opened in 1993 and is 10 stories tall. The humid interior simulates a rainforest environment. The multi-level Rainforests of the World project focuses on conservation education. Animals featured in the exhibit include giant Amazon river otters, saki monkeys, two-toed sloths, ocelots, birds, and reptiles.

== Discovery Pyramid ==
The Discovery Pyramid opened in 1997 and features traveling exhibits and a motion-simulation film ride.

In May 2015, Moody Gardens added a semi-permanent exhibit to the bottom level of the Discovery Pyramid, the SpongeBob SubPants Adventure ride. The SpongeBob themed attraction was the recipient of an Award for Outstanding Achievement in 2016 by the Themed Entertainment Association.

In 2019, the SpongeBob SubPants Adventure was closed and replaced by "20,000 Leagues Under The Sea: An Interactive Adventure", an interactive 4D film.

In January 2021, the upper level of the Discovery Pyramid featured the exhibition Jam Remastered: The Science of Music, an experience that explores the connection between music, science, and mathematics.

== Palm Beach ==
Palm Beach was initially opened in 1988 as the first attraction of Moody Gardens. The white sand used in the construction of the Palm Beach attractions was imported from the coastal beaches of the Florida peninsula. The artificial beach is situated adjacent to, but not connected to, Galveston Bay.

Palm Beach was later expanded to a full-use water park.

== Zip line and ropes course ==
In May 2014, Moody Gardens opened a rope and zip-line attraction. Called the Sky Trail Ropes Course, the five-story structure is the tallest steel ropes course on the Gulf Coast. The Moody Gardens Zip Line is 500 feet (150 m) long and spans Palm Beach. Moody Gardens also features the Sky Tykes Ropes Course for children.

The ropes course and zip line was manufactured, installed, and is serviced by Ropes Courses Inc.

== Golf course ==
In 2007, the Moody Foundation signed an agreement with the City of Galveston to rebuild the city's municipal golf course. The new course was designed by Peter Jacobsen of Jacobsen Hardy Golf Course Design and was constructed to keep historical features while improving certain holes and course flow. The $17 million renovation included the addition of new turf grass, green complexes, elevations, cart paths, and a clubhouse renovation.

The course reopened in June 2008 under the moniker Moody Gardens Golf Course.
