= American National Insurance Company =

U.S. financial service company

Coordinates: 29.307°N 94.7899°W

- Type: Private
- Industry: Financial services; Insurance
- Founded: 1905; 121 years ago
- Headquarters: One Moody Plaza; Galveston, Texas, U.S.
- Key people: Tim Walsh (president & CEO)
- Products: Insurance, annuities, mutual funds, Financial products
- Revenue: US$4.391 billion (2021)
- Net income: US$467.5 million (2020)
- Total assets: US$29.5 billion (2020)
- Total equity: US$6.6 billion (2020)
- Owner: Brookfield Asset Management Reinsurance
- Number of employees: 2,700 (2025)
- Website: americannational.com

American National Insurance Company (ANICO) is a major American insurance corporation based in Galveston, Texas. The company and its subsidiaries operate in all 50 U.S. states and Puerto Rico. Brookfield Reinsurance acquired the American National Insurance Company on May 22, 2022.

== History ==
American National Insurance Company was founded in Texas in 1905. William Lewis Moody, Jr. became president of American National Insurance and Trust Company, relocating its headquarters to Galveston. The following year, he reincorporated the firm as American National Insurance Company. In less than a decade, the company amassed a workforce of 770 and was selling more than $22 million in policies.

During the 1920s, American National's assets grew by 400 percent to over $38 million in value, while it had acquired 27 other companies. The home office in Galveston employed over 500 people and were managing $600 million in policies.

Despite the Great Depression, American National avoided layoffs and maintained profitability, growing assets by 37% from 1930 to 1935. By 1939, its assets reached $82 million, with insurance in force totaling $777 million.

World War II brought rapid growth, and in 1942, American National became the first Texas insurer to surpass $100 million in assets. In 1950, it expanded into accident insurance by acquiring Commonwealth Life and Accident Insurance Company. By 1954, after nearly 50 years of leadership, Moody died, leaving the company to his daughter, Mary Moody Northen. By 1959, insurance in force reached $5 billion.

The late 1950s saw governance challenges, leading to state intervention in the Moody Foundation’s board structure. Leadership changes followed, with W.L. Volger taking the presidency in 1961, succeeded by R.A. Forbush in 1963. Under their guidance, American National diversified, acquiring Securities Management & Research, Inc. (SM&R) and entering financial services. By 1968, insurance in force hit $10 billion.

In 1969, Phil B. Noah became president, overseeing acquisitions including Equitable Insurance Company of Texas. By 1971, the company completed its 20-story headquarters in Galveston. In 1973, American National launched American National Property and Casualty Company (ANPAC), expanding into multiple insurance lines. Legal battles over Moody Foundation management ensued, ultimately returning control to the Moody family.

During the late 1970s and 1980s, American National continued expanding, acquiring Standard Life & Accident Insurance Company and selling Trans World Life. The Moody family regained leadership with Robert Moody as board chair in 1981. The company acquired American Health & Life’s operations in 1987 and purchased several Primerica insurance companies in 1988. By 1989, annual revenues exceeded $1 billion, and insurance in force surpassed $30 billion.

The early 1990s saw diversification efforts, including acquisitions and expanding distribution channels to banks and auto dealers. In 1992, American National bought Garden State Life Insurance Company, marking further growth. By 1993, the company had paid annual dividends for 82 consecutive years and earned an A-double-plus rating from A.M. Best Company.

By the late 1990s, life insurance remained the company’s core business, contributing over 70% of earnings. Though its workforce of field agents had halved since the late 1980s, insurance in force stood at $43.8 billion in 1997, with consolidated assets reaching $8.5 billion. Net income rose 15% from 1996 to $248 million.

As the company neared the year 2000, its stability and conservative management ensured continued prosperity. Founder William Moody’s heirs retained control, managing more than 61% of the company through the Moody Foundation and The Libbie S. Moody Trust.

In August 2021, Brookfield Asset Management announced that it had agreed to acquire American National for $5.1 billion. The acquisition was completed in May 2022.

In 2026, American National Insurance completed its move out of One Moody Plaza in Galveston.

== Affiliated companies ==
- American National Life Insurance Company of Texas
- American National Life Insurance Company of New York
- American National Property And Casualty Company
- Farm Family Casualty Insurance Company
- United Farm Family Insurance Company
- Garden State Life Insurance Company
