= Santiago del Valle =

Mexican politician

President of the Constituent Congress of Coahuila and Texas
- In office 15 February 1827 – 15 March 1827
- Preceded by: Francisco Antonio Gutiérrez
- Succeeded by: José María Viesca

Santiago del Valle was a Mexican hacendado and government official for Coahuila y Tejas (Coahuila and Texas) during the Texas Revolution. Del Valle obtained a land grant from the Mexican government, which led to the founding of Galveston, Texas and several towns in Travis County, including Del Valle, which is named in his honor. In 1825, he served as president of the Congreso Constituyente of the state of Coahuila y Tejas, counselor to governor Victor Blanco, and as the arbitrator in a feud between the Sánchez Navarro and Elizondo families.

== Land grant ==
The del Valle land grant was originally an empresario grant purchased by Benjamin Milam in 1825, in hopes of establishing a mining colony. In 1832, the Mexican government canceled Milam's grant due to an insufficient supply of new citizens for their colony in Texas, following a new law passed in 1830. In 1832, the 10 league grant was transferred to Del Valle, who lived and worked in Monclova at the time. In 1835, Samuel May Williams acquired ten leagues (about 44,000 acres (18,000 ha)) of the grant from Del Valle and sold the land to Michel Branamour Menard, who established the town that would become the present-day Galveston, Texas. Menard, in turn, sold nine leagues (about 40,000 acres (16,000 ha)) of land in Travis County, Texas to Thomas F. McKinney in 1839. Del Valle sold the remaining league of the grant, a swath of land south of Bastrop, Texas, to Bartlett Sims.

In the 1850s, McKinney settled the land and built a limestone homestead and grist mill along Onion Creek. McKinney sold all but approximately 2,800 acres of the land prior to his death; many of McKinney's land sales led to the present-day Pilot Knob, Creedmoor, Bluff Springs, and Del Valle. In Southeast Austin, much of McKinney's portion of the Del Valle grant was sold to plantation owners such as Albert Clinton Horton and Judge Sebron G. Sneed; both homesteads still remain. Some of the land grant was sold to the City of Austin, who leased 3,000 acres to the United States Army to create the Del Valle Army Air Base, later known as "Bergstrom Air Force Base" and currently the Austin-Bergstrom International Airport.

Following McKinney's death in 1873, his widow, Anna, sold the remaining land to James Woods Smith, whose family owned a farm on the land until 1973, when they donated it to the State of Texas in 1973 to create McKinney Falls State Park.
