= Samuel May Williams House =

Historic house in Texas, United States

- U.S. National Register of Historic Places
- Recorded Texas Historic Landmark
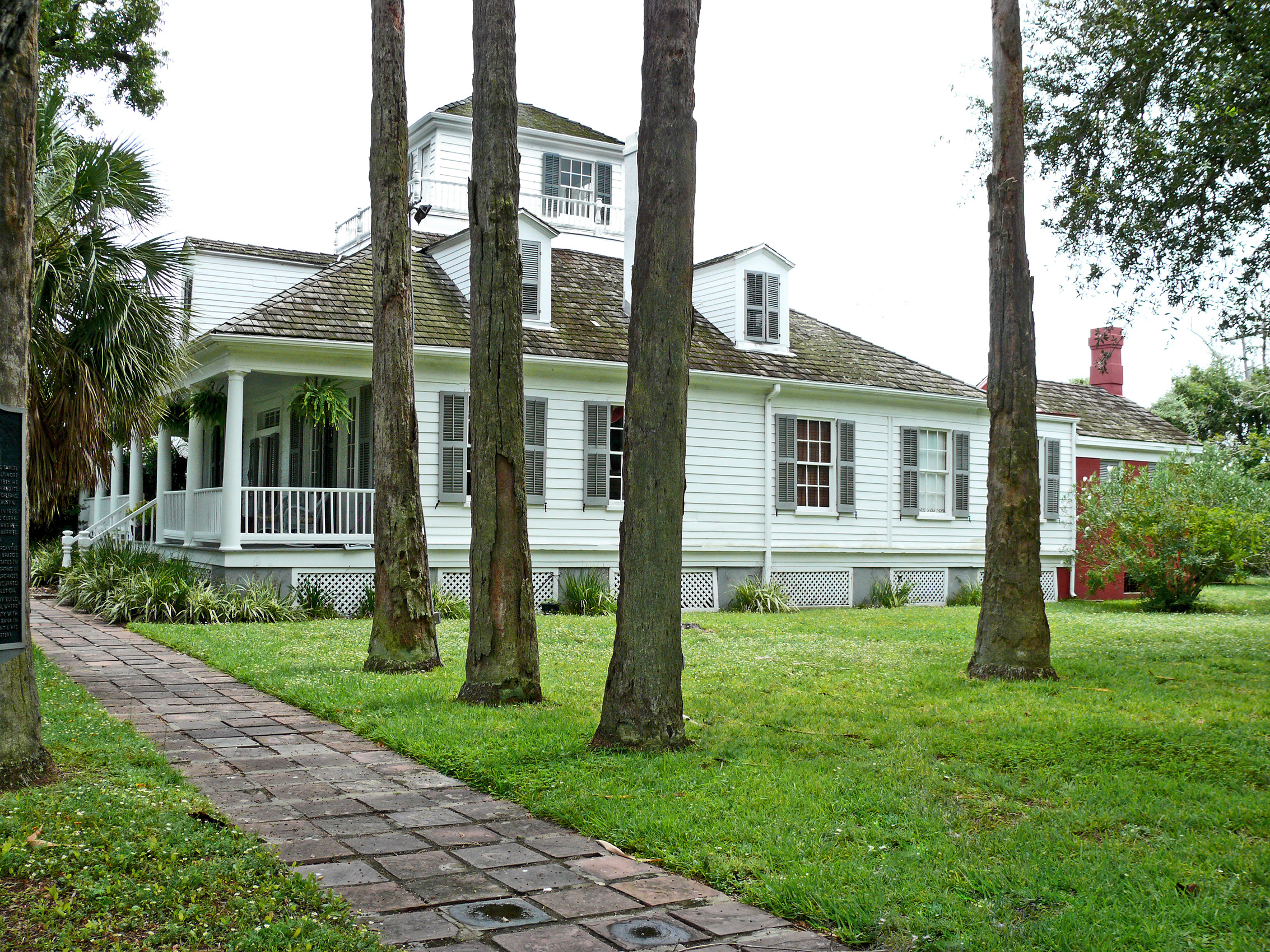
- Samuel May Williams House in 2012

- Location within Texas Location within the United States
- Location: 3601 Ave. P, Galveston, Texas
- Coordinates: 29°17′16″N 94°48′15″W
- Area: 0.7 acres (0.28 ha)
- Built: 1837
- Architectural style: Greek Revival
- NRHP reference No.: 71000934
- RTHL No.: 11596

Significant dates
- Added to NRHP: July 14, 1971
- Designated RTHL: 1964

The Samuel May Williams House is a former museum in Galveston, Texas. The second-oldest surviving residence in Galveston, it is now on the National Register of Historic Places. It was designated a Recorded Texas Historic Landmark in 1964.

The home was built in 1839 for Samuel May Williams, one of the founders of Galveston. The prefabricated house was shipped from Maine and constructed 7 feet (2.1 m) off the ground, supported by ten piers. The 1 1/2-story house was topped with a cupola, where Williams installed a telescope so that he could be one of the first to learn when interesting cargo arrived by ship. After Williams' death in 1858, the house was sold to his friend, Philip C. Tucker, Jr., and became known as the Tucker House. The Tucker family retained possession of the house until 1953.

The house was purchased by, and became the first project of, the newly organized Galveston Historical Foundation. Restoration was partially funded by a grant from the Moody Foundation. In 2007, the executive director of the GHF, stated "I can hardly overemphasize the importance of this house, not only to Galveston and Texas history, but to the history and affections of our organization." The house was opened to the public in 1959, restored to its original look in the late 1970s, and opened to regular tours in 1984. Attendance dropped from 25,000 to 1,000 visitors per year, and the museum was closed in 2007. The interiors were redesigned as part of an interior design showcase, and the house was offered for rent in 2008. It survived 2008's Hurricane Ike with minimal damage. The GHF sold the property in 2014.

== History ==
=== Background ===
Samuel May Williams moved to Mexican Texas in 1822 and soon began working as the secretary to Stephen F. Austin, the first empresario in Texas. During the Texas Revolution (1835–1836), Williams and his business partner Thomas F. McKinney used $99,000 of their own funds to purchase supplies for the Texian Army; Williams also purchased the first ship in the Texas Navy, the schooner Invincible.

The war concluded with a Texian victory over Mexico, and the province known as Texas became an independent nation, the Republic of Texas. Between 1836 and 1838, McKinney and Williams worked with Michel B. Menard to get federal permission for the Galveston City Company to create a community on the eastern end of Galveston Island. In April 1838, Williams was named one of five directors of the company, which had permission to sell shares that could be redeemed for land or resold. The new city of Galveston grew rapidly, with over 4,000 residents in 1840. The city was geographically isolated, with no fresh water. There was not a bridge to connect the island to the mainland, and water was delivered by steamer every day.

=== Construction ===
In late 1838, Williams won election to the Fourth Congress. He asked McKinney to supervise the building of a home for the Williams family. Like most of the wealthier residents in the city, Williams wished to live along the banks of McKinney's Bayou. His 22 acres (8.9 ha) lot was located near the bayou at 35th Street and Avenue A, about 2 miles (3.2 km) west of the town.

Williams had ordered a prefabricated house, which was shipped from Maine. It was built in the Greek Revival style, with some elements of classic Louisiana plantation architecture. To allow the house to better weather storms, it was elevated 7 feet (2.1 m) on ten brick piers. The bricks used for the piers were transported to Galveston as ballast on ships. The 1 1/2-story house was topped with a cupola and widow's walk. The first floor had long porches, and dormer windows adorned the attic. The cupola windows could be opened, allowing cool ocean breezes to enter the house. The house faces east, and had a large gallery on both the south and east sides.

The downstairs consisted of a parlor, dining room, central hallway, and two bedrooms. Both the parlor and the front bedroom had French doors that opened onto the porch. The upstairs had four small bedrooms, each with a dormer. Classical wood columns supported the porch roof, and a white picket fence surrounded the house. A detached brick kitchen was in the rear, and on either side of the house were 10 acres (4.0 ha) garden plots. Williams estimated that the house cost $7,472.

=== Williams family residence ===
For the next 20 years, Williams, his wife, and children lived in the house. Williams often lounged on the widow's walk. At this time, Galveston Island had few trees or tall buildings, and from the widow's walk Williams could see the Gulf. He could also watch the horse races at a nearby race track which he co-owned with McKinney. He installed a telescope on the widow's walk, pointed towards the harbor. It was customary for ships to flash signals as they approached land to inform the harbormaster of the types of cargo they carried. Williams used his telescope to examine approaching ships; if one flashed the signal of an interesting cargo, Williams would rush downtown to start trading. This gave him a competitive advantage over other merchants, who did not learn of the cargo until the ship was closer to shore. Partially as a result of this tactic, the McKinney & Williams commission house "was considered one of the wealthiest and most influential establishments in Texas".

As Williams' wealth grew, he made his home more comfortable. He ordered portraits painted of both himself and his wife; these were hung in the parlor of the house. In a stable behind the house he kept two horses, a carriage, and a barouche. The family had four slaves, who lived in outbuildings near the kitchen.

Williams died in the house on September 13, 1858, of what his doctor called "general debility". The funeral was held several days later at the house.

=== Tucker family residence ===
In 1859, Williams' children sold the house to a family friend, Philip C. Tucker, and it became known as the Tucker House. The same year, Galveston received train service to the mainland; three times a week people could travel via train to Houston.

A fire in the 1890s destroyed the cupola and damaged some of the second story floors. The house survived the 1900 Galveston Hurricane, which devastated the island. After the storm, it was the second-oldest surviving house on the island. (Note: The oldest surviving house is the Michel B. Menard House, built in 1837.) During the reconstruction of the city, the grade of the populated portion of the island was raised. Four feet (1.2 m) of sand was pumped under the house, giving it the appearance of having only 3 feet (0.91 m) piers.

=== Preservation ===
In the 1950s, the "Free State of Galveston" collapsed as law enforcement worked to eradicate corruption and illegal activity. As the city's gambling, prostitution, and illegal drinking establishments were closed, city leaders began to look for other means to attract tourists. This prompted an increased interest in historic structures. The Galveston Historical Foundation (GHF) was established in this decade, primarily to save the Williams house.

To assist in preserving the house, the GHF received a grant from the Moody Foundation. The foundation had been established by Galveston resident William Lewis Moody Jr. to support educational, scientific, religious, and health institutions in Texas. Its chairman, Mary Moody Northen, who was a member of the Texas Historical Commission advisory board, emphasized historic preservation. The GHF restored the house, and in 1959 it opened to the public. The site was added to the National Register of Historic Places in 1971.

After finishing the restoration, the GHF worked to restore other historical buildings in Galveston. The GHF absorbed the Galveston Historical Society shortly after, becoming one of the largest locally based groups focused on historic preservation in the United States. Author Susan Wiley Hardwick wrote that "The initial work of the GHF, preservation of the Williams home, set the stage for the preservation and redevelopment of the Strand commercial district, located one block from the harbor."

=== Museum ===
Initially, the house was furnished with donated items. The GHF conducted extensive research in 1978 to determine the house's appearance during Williams' lifetime. The house was subsequently restored to its 1854 appearance, with a reconstructed cupola. It was reopened to the public for regular tours in 1984. In the 1980s, it received up to 25,000 visitors each year. For a time, the museum used innovative interpretive technology. As technology changed, however, the museum fell behind. New audiovisual systems and technology are expensive and, as with most historic house museums, a limited budget made it difficult to adapt. Jessica Foy Donnelly wrote in Interpreting historic house museums that "changing technology for audiovisual systems contributed to the failure [of the Williams house museum] to continue an exciting interpretive technique."

In 2004, the house received new landscaping, donated from the Hotel Galvez. In preparation for adding a new outdoor pavilion, the Galvez uprooted hundreds of shrubs and perennials. Many of these, including oleanders, daylilies, hibiscus, plumbago, agapanthus, and bougainvillea, were relocated to the grounds around the Williams house.

Attendance slowly dwindled, and in the first nine months of 2007 the museum received only 1,000 visitors, each of whom paid about $3 per ticket. These funds were not enough to cover maintenance on the house. The museum closed permanently at the end of September 2007.

=== Post-museum ===
After closing its doors to the public, the house was used by the Texas Gulf Coast Chapter of the American Society of Interior Designers as a showcase. The home was redesigned at no cost to the GHF. Designers donated their time, and businesses and craftsmen donated an estimated $100,000 worth of materials and time. The redesigned house features wood floors, stenciling in the entryway, and faux crown molding in the dining room. The color palette is now blues, roses, soft yellow, and gold colors, and the furniture is a mix of period pieces – some originally owned by the Williams family – and contemporary furniture. The theater was converted to a kitchen, and the bathroom was upgraded with antique fixtures.

After the showcase concluded, the GHF offered the house for lease. Tenants would also serve as curators and would be required to interview for the opportunity to live there. Tenants are requested to open the house or grounds occasionally. This is the first time that a group has leased a historic building with a newly redesigned interior. The home suffered minimal damage during Hurricane Ike, which hit Galveston in September 2008.

In early 2016 the GHF sold the house to Leah and Mariano Garcia-Blanco, who moved to Galveston from North Carolina in 2014 and planned to restore the interior.

== Legacy ==
In 2007, Dwayne Jones, then executive director of the GHF, stated "I can hardly overemphasize the importance of this house, not only to Galveston and Texas history, but to the history and affections of our organization. The house inspired a generation of active, public-spirited Galvestonians to found what has grown into the largest local historic preservation group in the nation — an organization that has had a profound effect on our community."

The house is reputed to be haunted by Williams. Tourists have reported feeling a cold draft and a presence outside the bedrooms of the children.

A replica of the house was built in the Woodlands, a northern suburb of Houston, in the early 2000s. Homebuilder Insignia Homes chose six historic Texas houses, and built luxury replicas in a single neighborhood. (Note: Four of the other homes were the Col. Elijah Sterling Clack Robertson Plantation, the Oge Mansion of San Antonio, the Rose Mansion of Salada, and the Browning Plantation in Chappell Hill.) Although the exterior is almost identical to the original Williams house, the interiors were redesigned to be more modern.

== See also ==
- National Register of Historic Places listings in Galveston County, Texas
- Recorded Texas Historic Landmarks in Galveston County

== Sources ==
- Cartwright, Gary (1998). Galveston: A History of the Island. TCU Press. ISBN 978-0-87565-190-3.
- Donnelly, Jessica Foy (2002). Interpreting historic house museums. Rowman Altamira. ISBN 978-0-7591-0251-4.
- Hardwick, Susan Wiley (2002). Mythic Galveston: reinventing America's third coast. JHU Press. ISBN 978-0-8018-6887-0. - Read online
- Henson, Margaret Swett (1976). Samuel May Wililams, Early Entrepreneur. Texas A&M University Press. ISBN 978-0-89096-009-7.
- McComb, 1David G. (1986). Galveston: a history. University of Texas Press. ISBN 978-0-292-72053-4.
- Wiencek, Henry; Moody, Robert L. Sr.; McLeod, E. Douglas (May 21, 2010). The Moodys of Galveston and Their Mansion. Volume 13 of Sara and John Lindsey Series in the Arts and Humanities. Texas A&M University Press. ISBN 978-1-60344-182-7.
- Williams, Scott (2007). Haunted Texas: A Travel Guide. Globe Pequot. ISBN 978-0-7627-4495-4.
