= McKinney Homestead =

Historic house in Texas, United States

- U.S. National Register of Historic Places
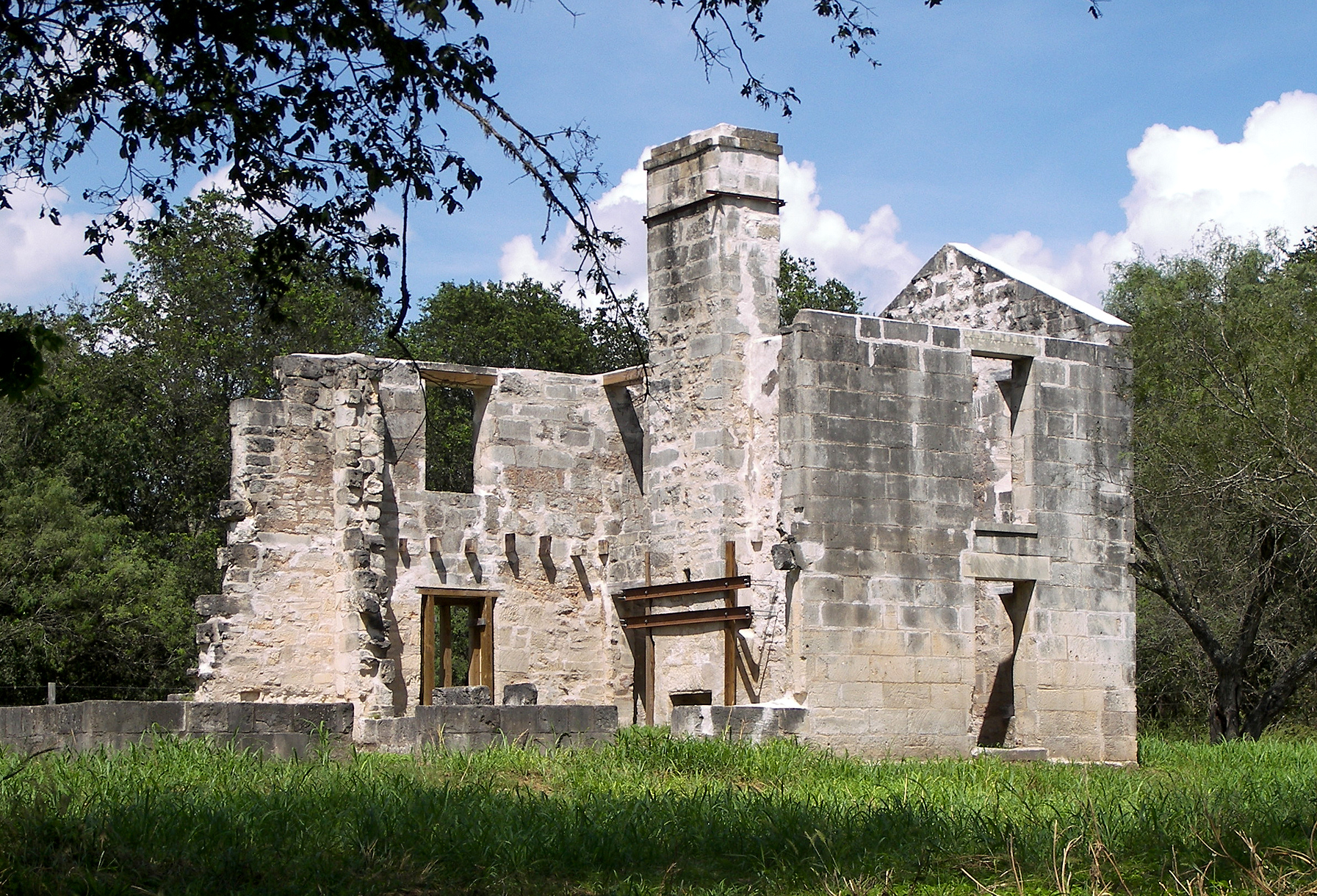
- The ruins of the McKinney Homestead in 2007.
- Location: SW of Austin between TX 71 and U.S. 183
- Nearest city: Austin, Texas, USA
- Coordinates: 30°11′23″N 97°43′14″W
- Built: 1850s
- NRHP reference No.: 74002093
- Added to NRHP: October 16, 1974

The McKinney Homestead is a former limestone home built between 1850 and 1852 by Thomas F. McKinney, owner of the surrounding land. The two-story homestead was continuously occupied until it burned in the 1940s.

Archaeological investigations in 1974 determined the house was built with limestone quarried from Onion Creek. The framing lumber was cypress and cedar, both abundant on McKinney's land. The same wood was used for the doors, window frames and roof shakes. The house was approximately twenty foot by forty foot and had two stories. There were three rooms on each floor and a covered porch both upstairs and downstairs.

Most of McKinney's land and the house were sold to James W. Smith in 1885, Smith's grandchildren granted 682 acres (2.76 km^{2}) to the state of Texas in 1974. It opened as McKinney Falls State Park in 1976. The former homestead was added to the National Register of Historic Places in 1974. It has since been stabilized to prevent further deterioration of the stone structure. The ruins can be accessed via the park's designated "Homestead Trail."
