= Michel B. Menard House =

Historic house in Galveston, Texas

- U.S. National Register of Historic Places
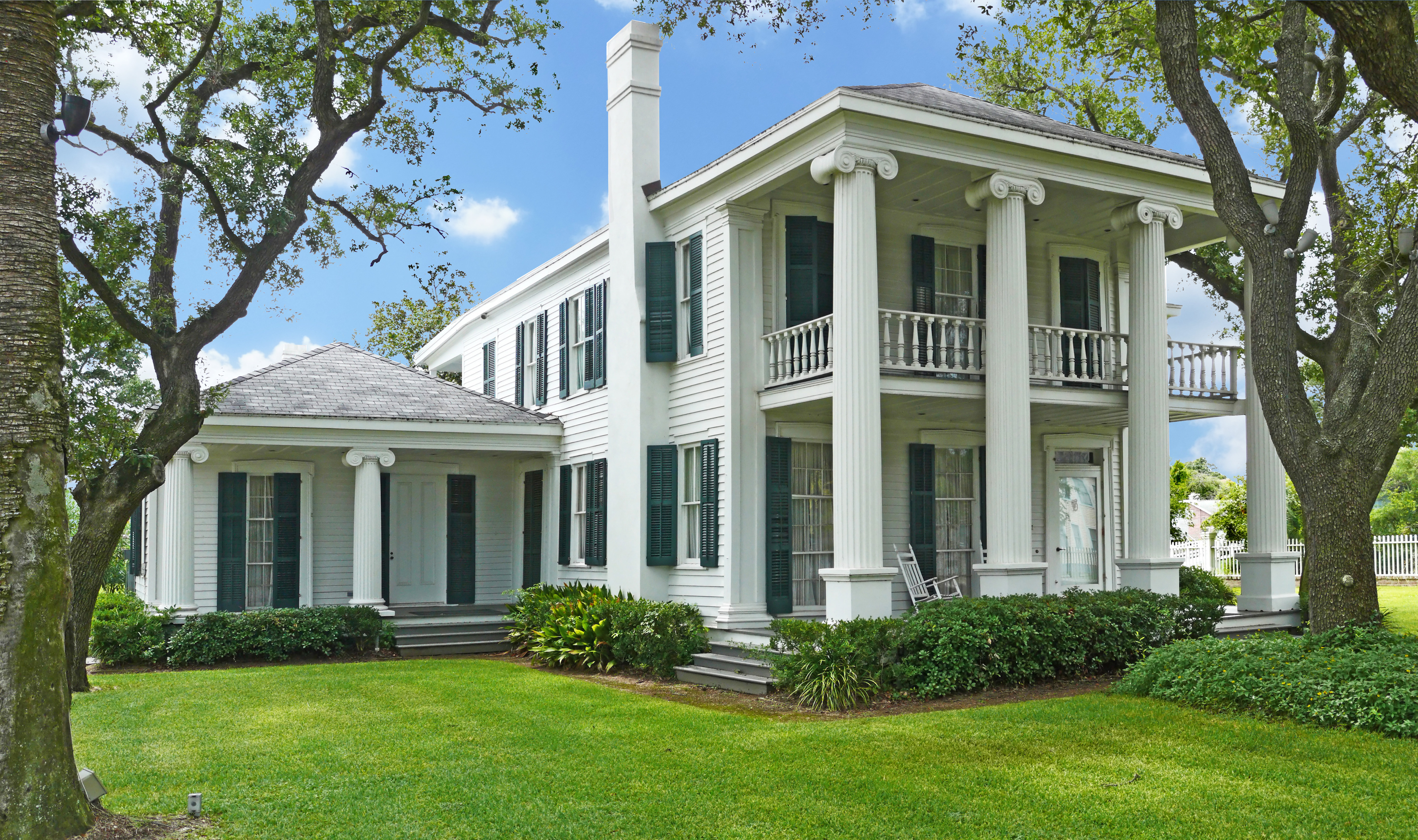
- Michel B. Menard House in 2012

- Location within Texas Location within the United States
- Location: 1605 33rd St., Galveston, Texas
- Coordinates: 29°17′27″N 94°48′6″W
- Area: 1 acre (0.40 ha)
- Built: 1838
- Architectural style: Greek Revival
- Website: 1838 Michel B. Menard House
- NRHP reference No.: 76002031
- Added to NRHP: December 12, 1976

The Menard House, also known as The Oaks, is a historic detached-home located at 1605 Thirty-Third Street in Galveston, Texas. Built in 1838, it is the oldest surviving structure in Galveston as recently as 2014 and is on the National Register of Historic Places.The address for the home is 1604 33rd St, Galveston TX.

== History ==
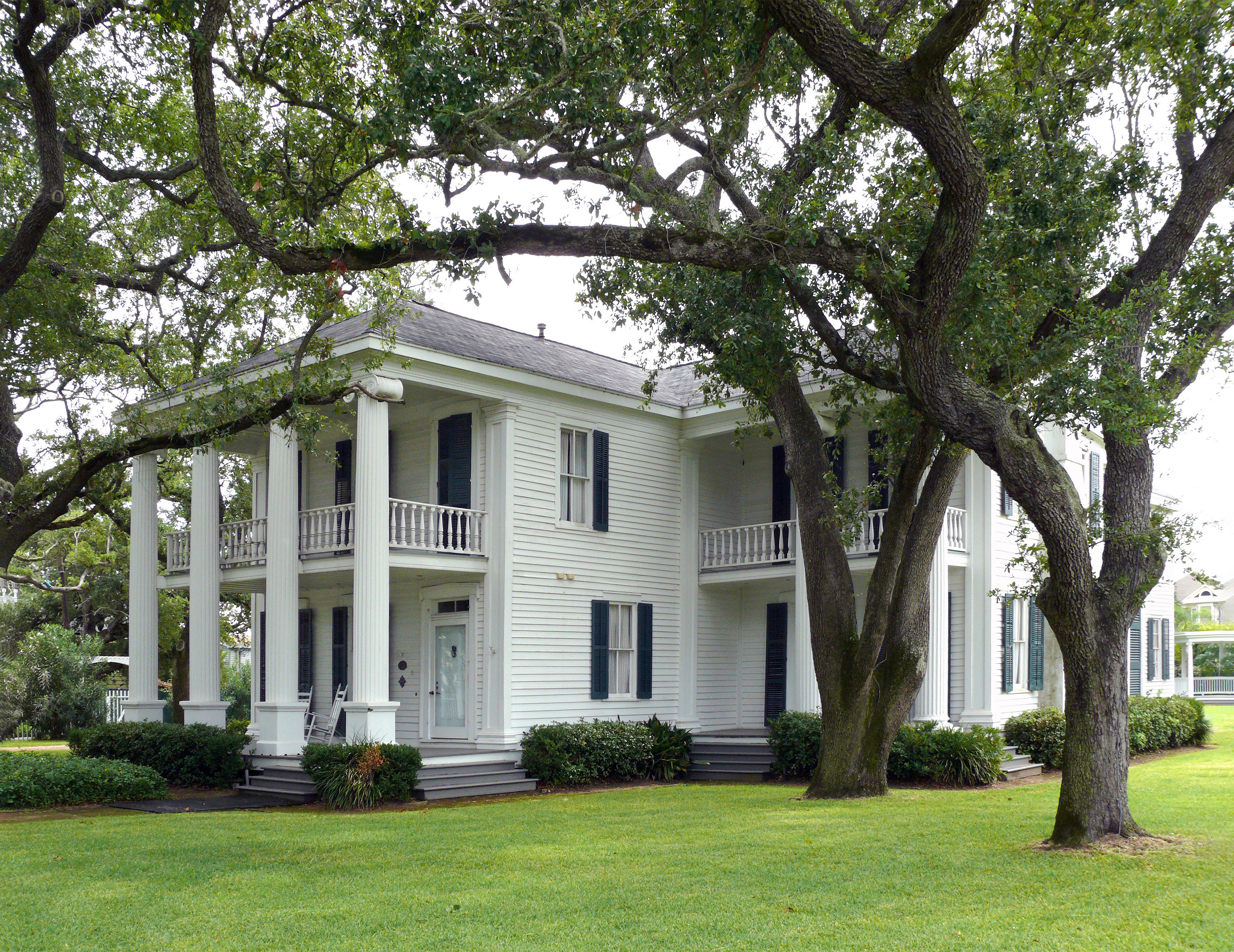
Home of Michael Branamour Menard (2012)

The Menard House is named for its first owner, Michel B. Menard, a Canadian-born trader, real estate investor, and a founder of Galveston. Menard built on outlot block 37, indicating a location outside of Galveston city limits. The Menard House was fabricated, then shipped from Maine in parts. The combination of a dearth of carpenters in 1830s Texas and excess cargo space in Texas-bound ships made prefabricated buildings economically viable. Menard probably started building the house in 1837 for his second wife, Catherine Maxwell. She died in the summer of 1838, the same year construction was completed. Houston co-founder and Galveston City Company investor John Kirby Allen purchased the property in 1838, but died that July.

By 1843, a cousin had deeded the property to Menard's third wife, Mary Jane (Clemens) Riddle Menard. She lived in the house until her death in December 1843. Michel Menard married Rebecca Mary Bass and adopted her two children. In 1850, they had a child, Doswell Menard. Around this time, Menard added two wings to the house, which later became the venue for Galveston's first Mardi Gras ball in 1853.

Four years after Michel Menard died in 1856, Rebecca Menard married Colonel J.S. Thrasher, former United States Consul at Havana, Cuba. Edwin Ketchum purchased the house from the Menard family in 1880 and the Ketchum family kept the house well-maintained until 1977.

== Restoration ==
The Galveston Historical Foundation and the National Trust for Historic Preservation bought the Menard House in June 1992. In 1994, Pat and Fred Burns of Houston acquired the deteriorating building, then completed its restoration in 1995. The Menard House opened for the 1995 Historic Homes Tour, hosting 6,500 visitors for the event.

The Menard House suffered no serious damage during Hurricane Ike.

== See also ==
- National Register of Historic Places listings in Galveston County, Texas

== Bibliography ==
- Beasley, Ellen; Fox, Stephen (1996). Galveston Architectural Guidebook. Houston: Rice University Press. ISBN 0-89263-345-X.
- Schmidt, Sally Anne (2009). "Saving Galveston: A History of the Galveston Historical Foundation". Rice University. PhD Dissertation.
