= Strand Historic District =

Historic district in Texas, United States

- The Strand Historic District
- U.S. National Register of Historic Places
- U.S. National Historic Landmark District
- U.S. Historic district
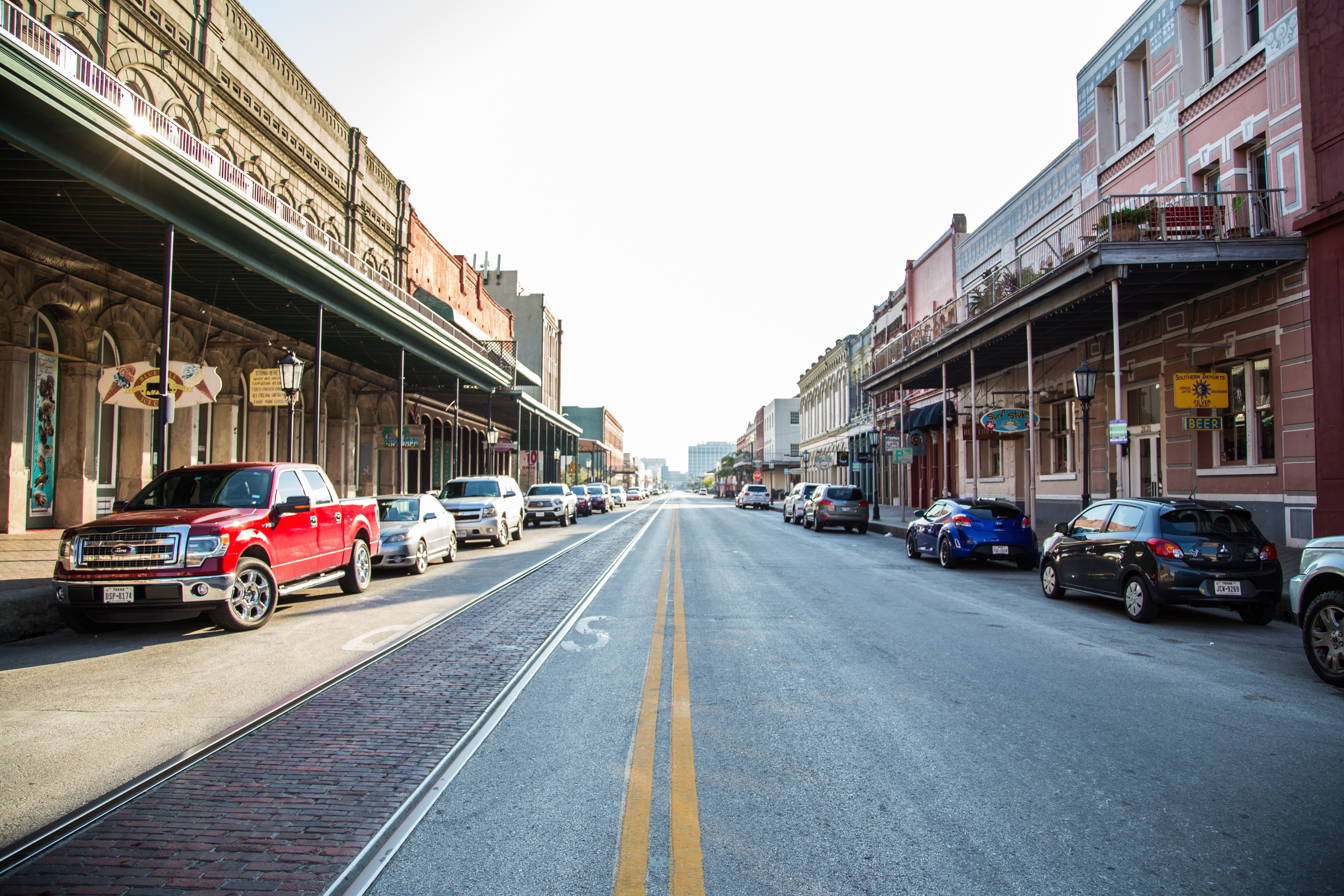
- The Strand

- Location within Texas Location within the United States
- Location: Roughly bounded by Ave. A, 20th St., alley between Aves. C and D, and railroad depot, Galveston, Texas
- Area: 45 acres (18 ha)
- Built: 1850
- Architect: Multiple
- Architectural style: Greek Revival, Late Victorian, Beaux-Arts
- NRHP reference No.: 70000748

Significant dates
- Designated NHLD: May 11, 1976
- Designated HD: January 26, 1970

The Strand Historic District, also known as the Strand District, in downtown Galveston, Texas (USA), is a National Historic Landmark District of mainly Victorian era buildings that now house restaurants, antique stores, and curio shops. The area is a major tourist attraction for the island city and also plays host to two very popular seasonal festivals. It is widely considered the island's shopping and entertainment center. The district includes properties along the south side of Harborside Drive (Avenue A) and both sides of The Strand (Avenue B) and Mechanic Street (Avenue C) from 20th Street westward to 26th Street.

The street labeled "The Strand" is actually named Avenue B, which runs parallel to Galveston Bay.

The district was listed on the National Register of Historic Places in 1970, and was declared a National Historic Landmark in 1976 for its unparalleled collection of commercial Victorian architecture in Texas, and its role as the state's major port in the 19th century.

Today "the Strand" is generally used to refer to the entire five-block business district between 20th and 25th streets in downtown Galveston, very close to the city's wharf.

== History ==
The original plat of Galveston, drawn in the late 1830s, includes Avenue B. The name 'strand' for Ave. B was coined by a German immigrant named Michael William Shaw who opened a jewelry store on the corner of 23rd and Ave. B. Shaw, not liking the name "Ave. B", changed the name of the street on his stationery to "Strand", thinking that the name (named after a street in London) would have higher-class connotations for his jewelry store. He later convinced other owners on the street to change the names they used for the street as well, and the name stuck. (The word strand comes from the Old English word for "shore" or "river bank"; in German, Swedish and Dutch, the word means "beach".)

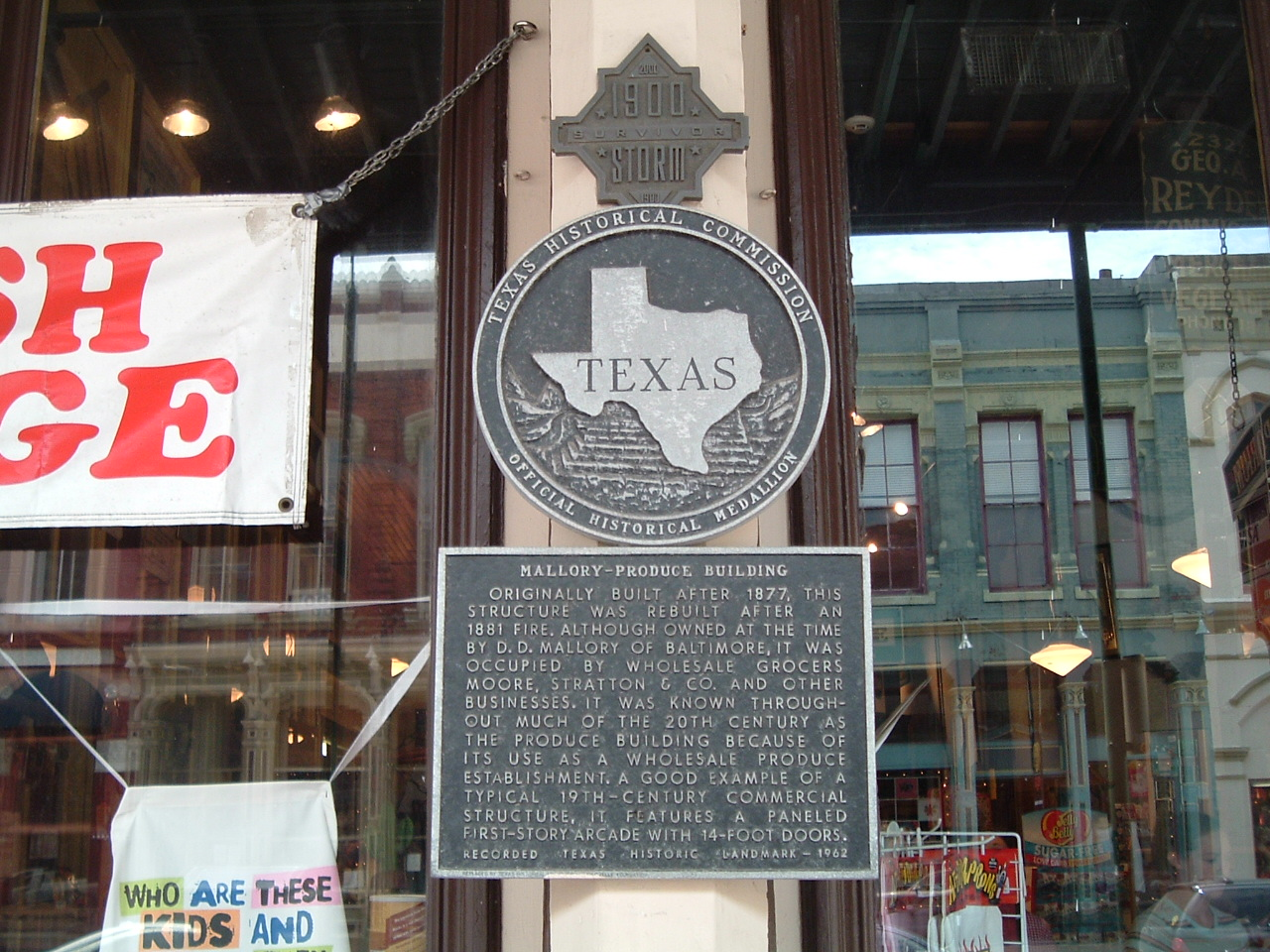
A historical marker on the Strand's old Mallory Produce building (now a curio shop), including a medallion above indicating the building survived the 1900 hurricane.

The Strand's very earliest buildings were typically wooden and vulnerable to fires and storms that hit the island frequently throughout the 19th century. Eventually those structures were replaced with iron-fronted brick buildings. The two oldest buildings still standing on the Strand date to 1855 and 1858; other historic buildings date back typically to the 1870s and 1880s.

Throughout the 19th century, the port city of Galveston boomed; and the Strand, which is very close to the harbor, grew into the region's main business center. For a time, it was known as the "Wall Street of the South".

Because of the Port of Galveston's enormous vessel traffic (between 700 and 1,400 vessels annually), the Strand became a popular place for major businesses to locate, including the state's five largest banks at the time, wholesalers, commission merchants, cotton brokers, attorneys and slave auctioneers. In 1881, businesses in the Strand district sold about US$38 million worth of merchandise and services. Between 1838 and 1842, 18 newspapers were started; The Galveston News, founded in 1842, is the lone survivor.

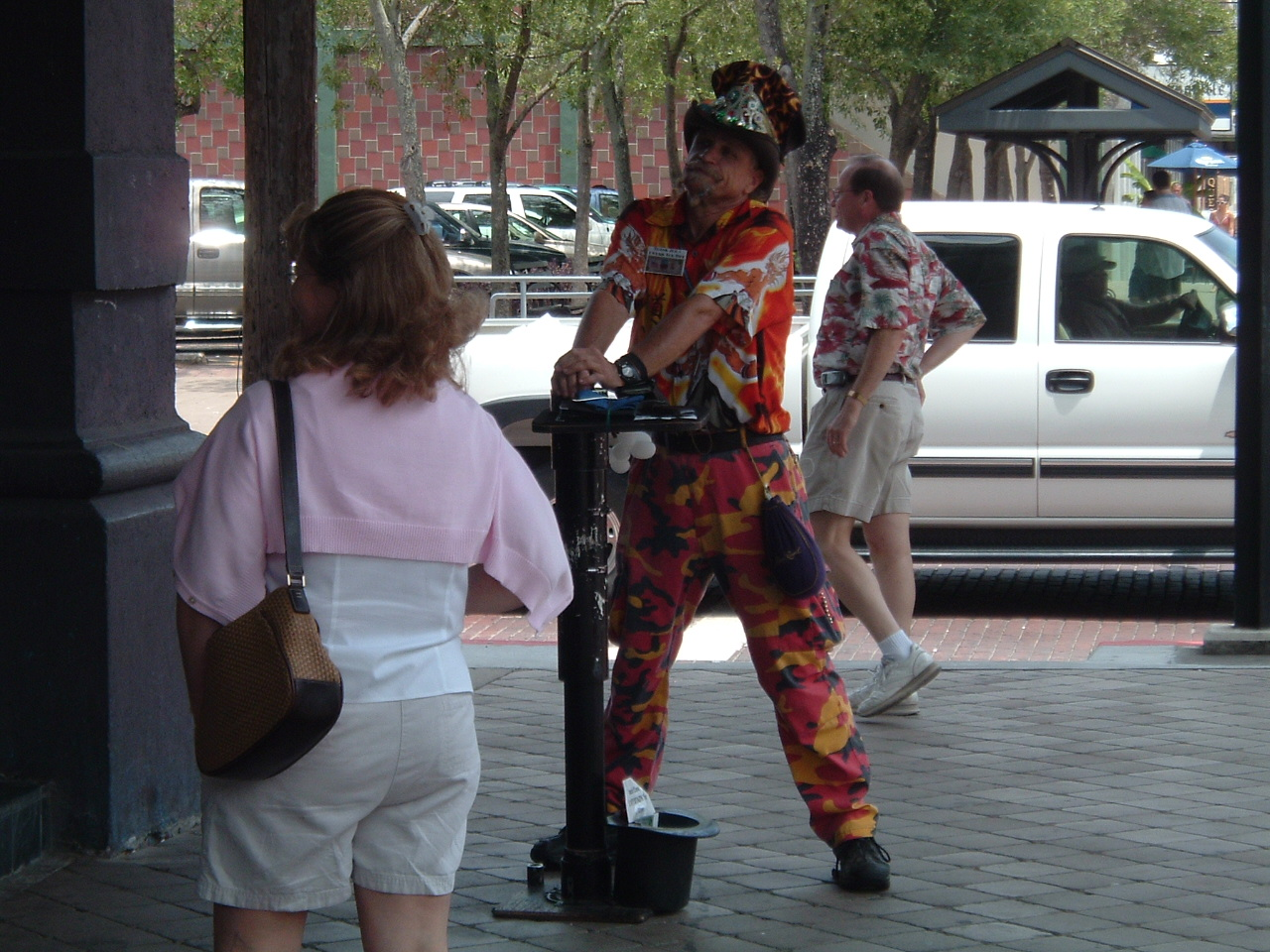
A street performer on the Strand

Because of the Strand's close proximity to Galveston's harbor, the area suffered some damage during several battles during the Civil War, particularly when Union forces barricaded the city. During the Battle of Galveston, Confederate forces fought from every corner of the area; several buildings suffered damage from shots and shelling. The battles forced many businesses to close and move to nearby Houston until the war's end. But most moved back into their regular quarters and enjoyed prosperity until the turn of the next century.

The Galveston hurricane of 1900 was devastating to much of the city, and the Strand district was no exception. Many of its buildings suffered catastrophic damage — some buildings lost entire floors, others lost elaborate cornices and flourishes. Many businesses elected to move away from the wharf and, by extension, away from the Strand. The area became a warehouse district, and was not revived until the 1960s when the Junior League of Galveston County restored two buildings.

That restoration effort sparked a revitalization project that is still ongoing. In 1973 the Galveston Historical Foundation followed suit, creating a trust fund for dramatic restorations of the Strand district that has sparked significant private investment as well.

== Present day ==
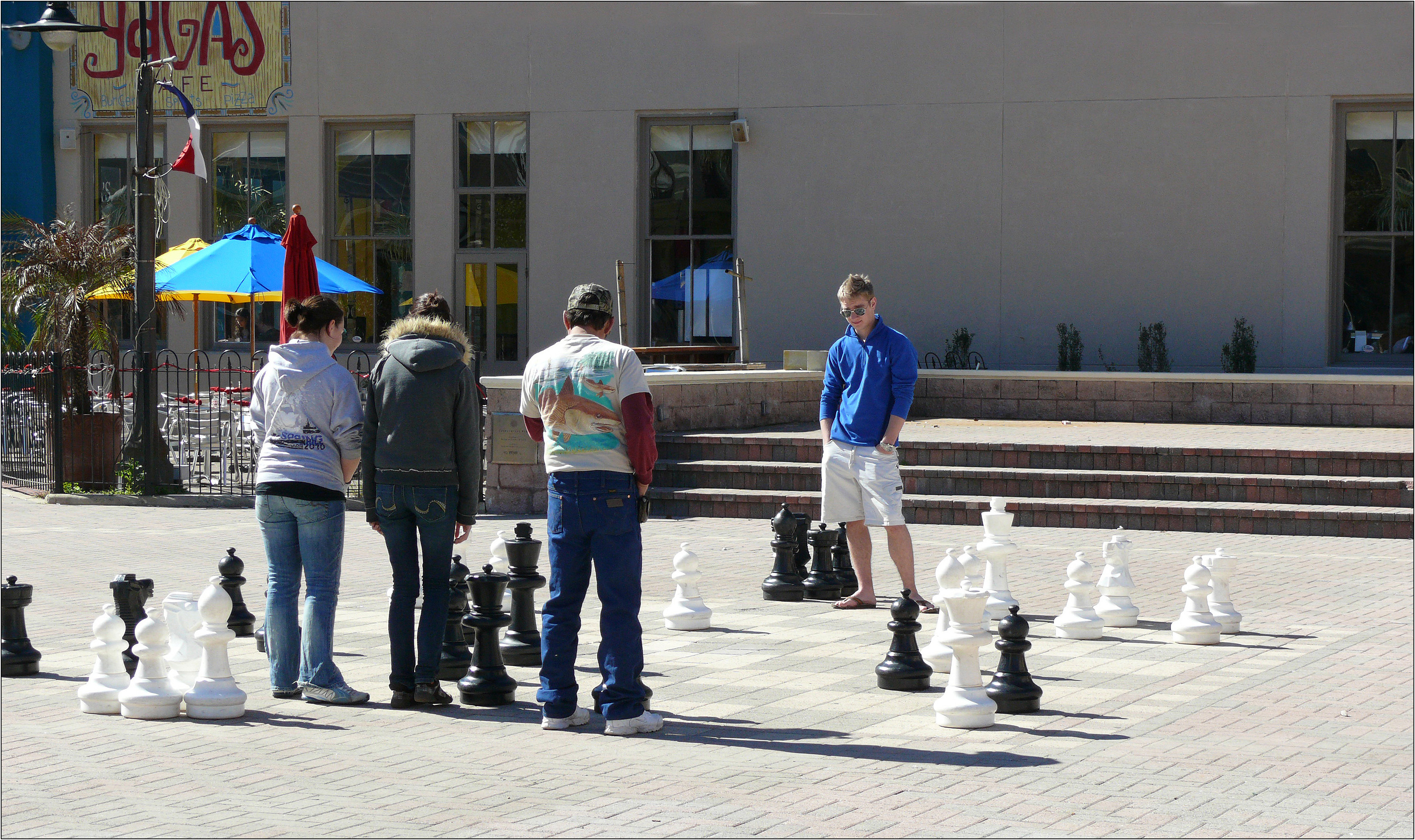
Chess at Saengerfest Park on the Strand

Today, the Strand features shops, historical exhibits, museums, art galleries and many restaurants and night clubs. It is also the location of a very popular annual Mardi Gras celebration, as well as a Christmas festival known as Dickens on the Strand, which celebrates the city's Victorian heritage with participants roaming the Strand in period dress.

Attractions within the area include The Galveston County Museum, the Galveston Railroad Museum, Victorian architecture, horse-drawn carriage rides, historical markers, an old fashioned trolley for transportation, and a giant chess set in Saengerfest Park, a small square park located on the corner of Tremont St (23rd St) and Strand St (Avenue B). It was created in the early 1990s by George and Cynthia Mitchell.

The historic district also contains a variety of retailers, including clothing, factory outlets, souvenir shops, art galleries, antique galleries.

On the outer edges of the Strand is the Post Office district, known for its antique galleries, art galleries, the Old Quarter Acoustic Cafe, and the Grand 1894 Opera House. Closer to the water is Pier 21, which has daily showings of the movies The Great Storm of 1900 and The Pirate Island of Jean Lafitte, the Ocean Star Offshore Drilling Rig & Museum, and the Texas Seaport Museum with tall ship Elissa.

The Strand sustained significant and catastrophic damage from the storm surge of Hurricane Ike on September 13, 2008, prompting the National Trust for Historic Preservation to add the district to the 2009 list of America's Most Endangered Places.

== See also ==
- List of National Historic Landmarks in Texas
- National Register of Historic Places listings in Galveston County, Texas
- Recorded Texas Historic Landmarks in Galveston County
