= McKinney Falls State Park =

State park in Texas, United States

McKinney Falls
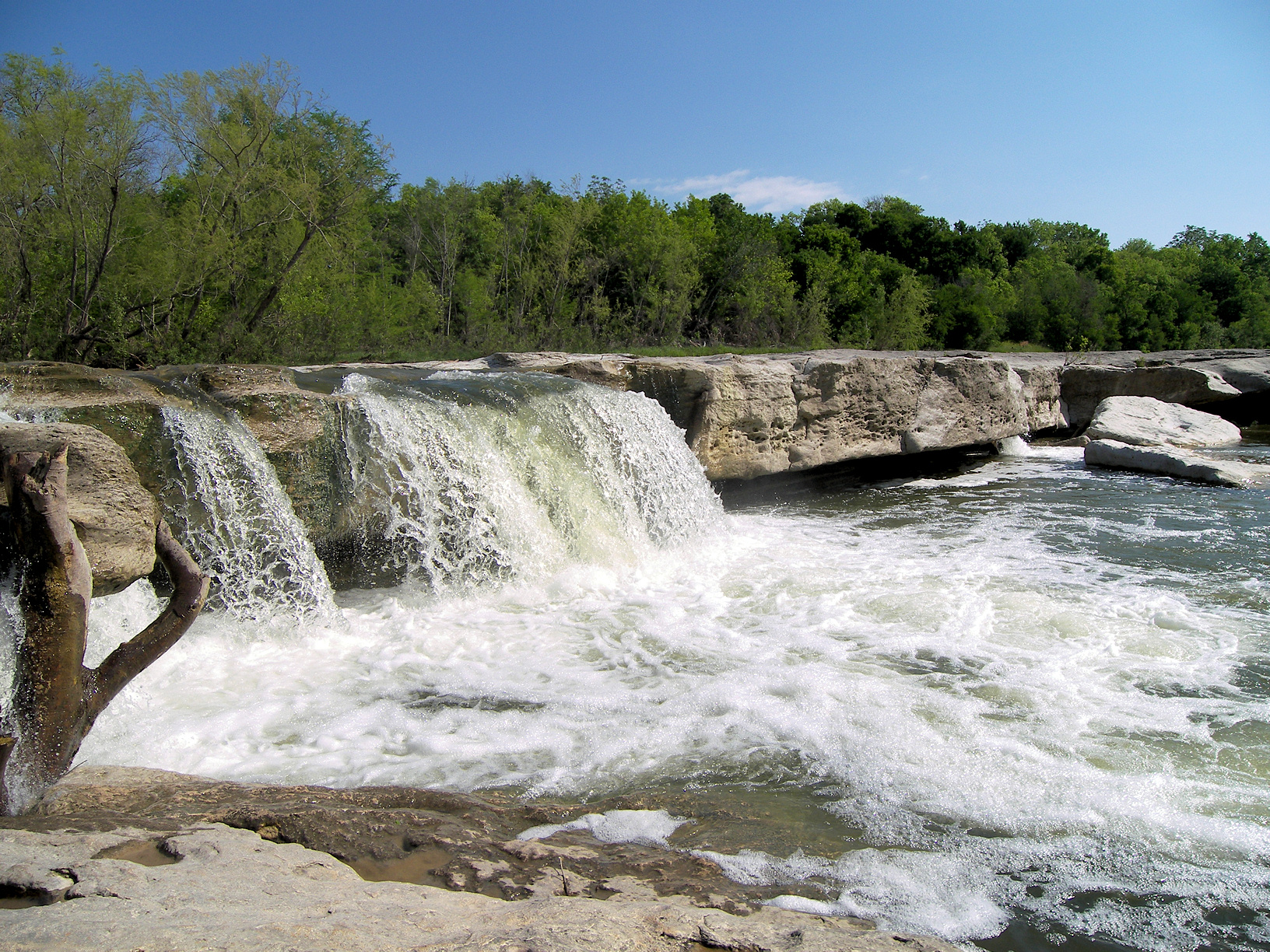
- Lower McKinney Falls
- Location: Travis County, Texas
- Nearest city: Austin
- Coordinates: 30°10′51″N 97°43′19″W
- Area: 744.4 acres (301 ha)
- Established: 1970
- Named for: Thomas F. McKinney
- Visitors: 283,523 (in 2025)
- Governing body: Texas Parks and Wildlife Department
- Website: Official site

McKinney Falls State Park is a 744.4-acre (301.2 ha) state park in Austin, Texas, United States at the confluence of Onion Creek and Williamson Creek. It is administered by the Texas Parks and Wildlife Department. The park opened on April 15, 1976 and is named after Thomas F. McKinney, a businessman, race horse breeder and rancher, who owned and lived on the land in the mid-to-late 19th century. The namesake features of the park are the scenic upper and lower falls along Onion Creek. The park is on the El Camino Real de los Tejas National Historic Trail.

== Pre-history ==
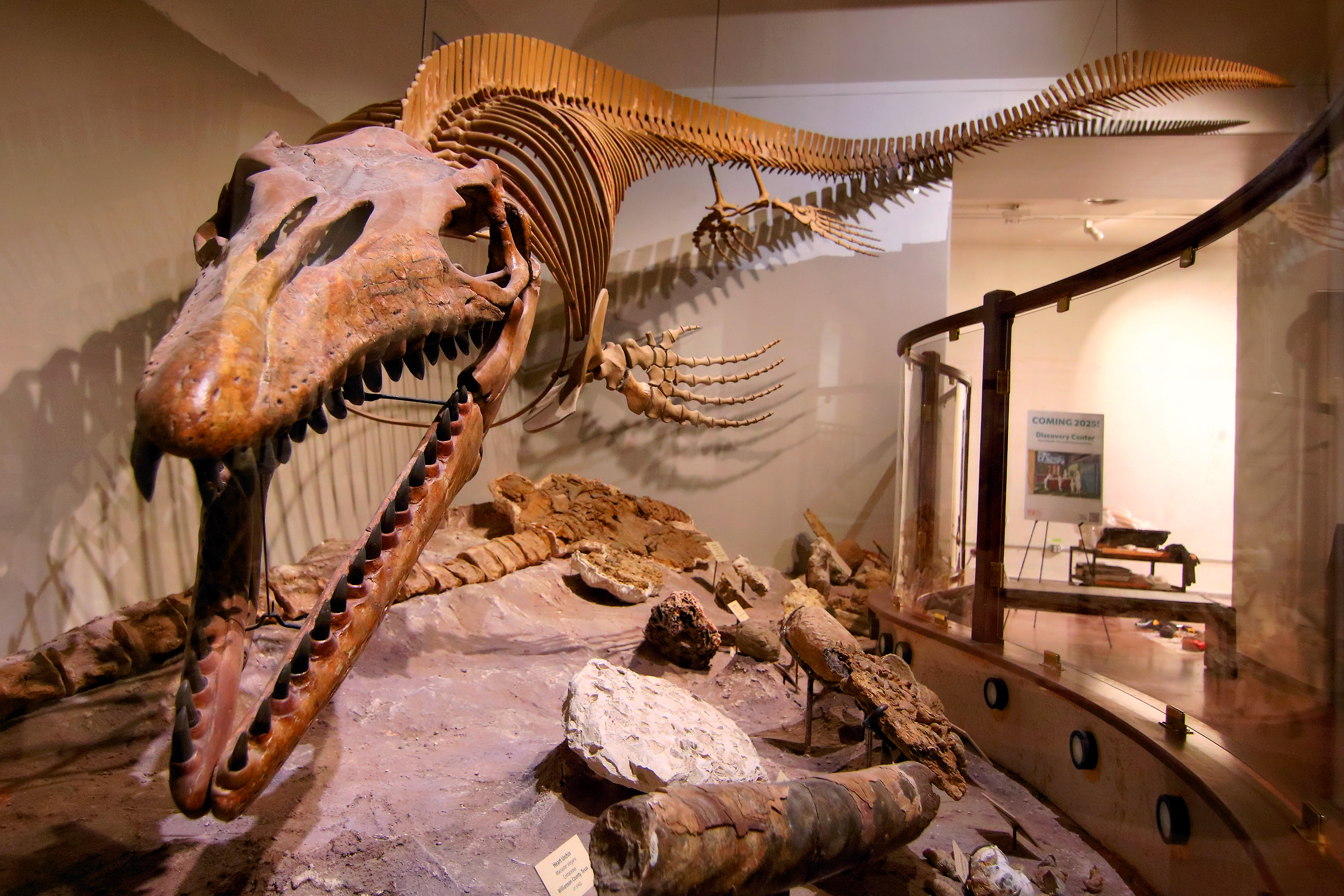
The Onion Creek Mosasaur skeleton at the Texas Science and Natural History Museum in Austin.

During the Cretaceous Period through the early Paleogene Period, much of Texas was covered by a shallow subtropical sea - the Western Interior Seaway. Aquatic reptiles swam in the sea as evidenced by a complete skeleton of a mosasaur found in the rocks of Onion Creek not far from the park. The calcium carbonate remains of the sea creatures accumulated during the millions of years of this period lithified into the limestone rock underneath the park's soil. In the park, shells of extinct sea animals such as species of Inoceramus and Exogyra are preserved in the limestone.

A once submarine volcano, now long extinct, called "Pilot Knob," spewed ash into the surrounding sea. The streams of soft volcanic debris eroded faster than the hard limestone. The removal of the softer layers and undercutting of the limestone by the Onion Creek led the falls to be formed over millions of years.

There is evidence that hunter-gatherers occupied the land that is now McKinney Falls State Park at least 8,750 years ago, maybe more. The tribes found water in the creek and protection among the rock shelters created by the same undercutting action that formed the falls.

== History ==
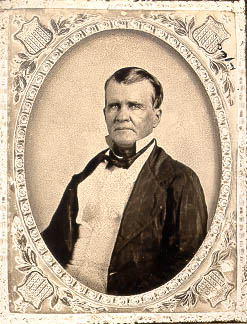
Thomas Freeman McKinney, the park's namesake.

In Spanish Texas, McKinney Falls State Park was traversed as part of the El Camino Real de Los Tejas. In 1716 the expedition of Domingo Ramón followed the left bank of Onion Creek along the western edge of the park to its junction with Williamson Creek. Indentations in the rock resulted from extensive use of the area.

The land that the park occupies was originally part of an eleven league (about 49,000 acres (20,000 ha)) grant that Mexican land speculator Santiago Del Valle purchased from the government of Mexico. Samuel May Williams acquired ten leagues (about 44,000 acres (18,000 ha)) of the grant from del Valle and sold the land to Michel Branamour Menard who in turn sold nine leagues (about 40,000 acres (16,000 ha)) to Thomas F. McKinney in 1839. McKinney did not move to his land until 1850 and took two years to build a stone house and barns. He also built a water-powered flour gristmill in 1852. The mill was destroyed by a flood in 1869 and the house by a fire in the late 1940s. McKinney lived on the land ranching and raising thoroughbred horses until his death on October 5, 1873. McKinney's wife, Anna, sold small parcels of land to relatives, and in 1885 she sold most of the land to James W. Smith.

In 1971, J.E. "Pete" Smith, the grandson of James Smith, donated 682 acres (276 ha) of the ranch to the State of Texas for a park. The land was appraised at $731,300 and the state received a matching federal grant to develop the park. After archaeological digs and surveys were completed, the park was developed. The park was dedicated on April 14, 1976 by Texas Governor Dolph Briscoe and opened to the public on April 15.

The Texas Legislature also approved funds for the Texas Parks and Wildlife Department to construct new state offices on a bluff on the northern edge of the donated land. The offices are outside the park boundaries and only accessible by a separate road.

Heavy rains that started on October 30, 2013, pushed the water of Onion Creek to its highest level since the park opened. Water flooded the Smith Visitor Center and damaged bathrooms, picnic sites and the Rockshelter Trail. The park was evacuated and temporarily closed while park staff cleaned up and repaired the damage. The Smith Visitor Center and part of the Rockshelter Trail officially reopened in 2022.

=== Historical Sites ===
The park also features the Smith Rock Shelter, a limestone overhang used for shelter by Native Americans for hundreds of years, along with the ruins of McKinney's stone house, gristmill and his horse trainer's cabin. The Smith Rock Shelter and the McKinney homestead have each been added to the National Register of Historic Places.

== Nature ==
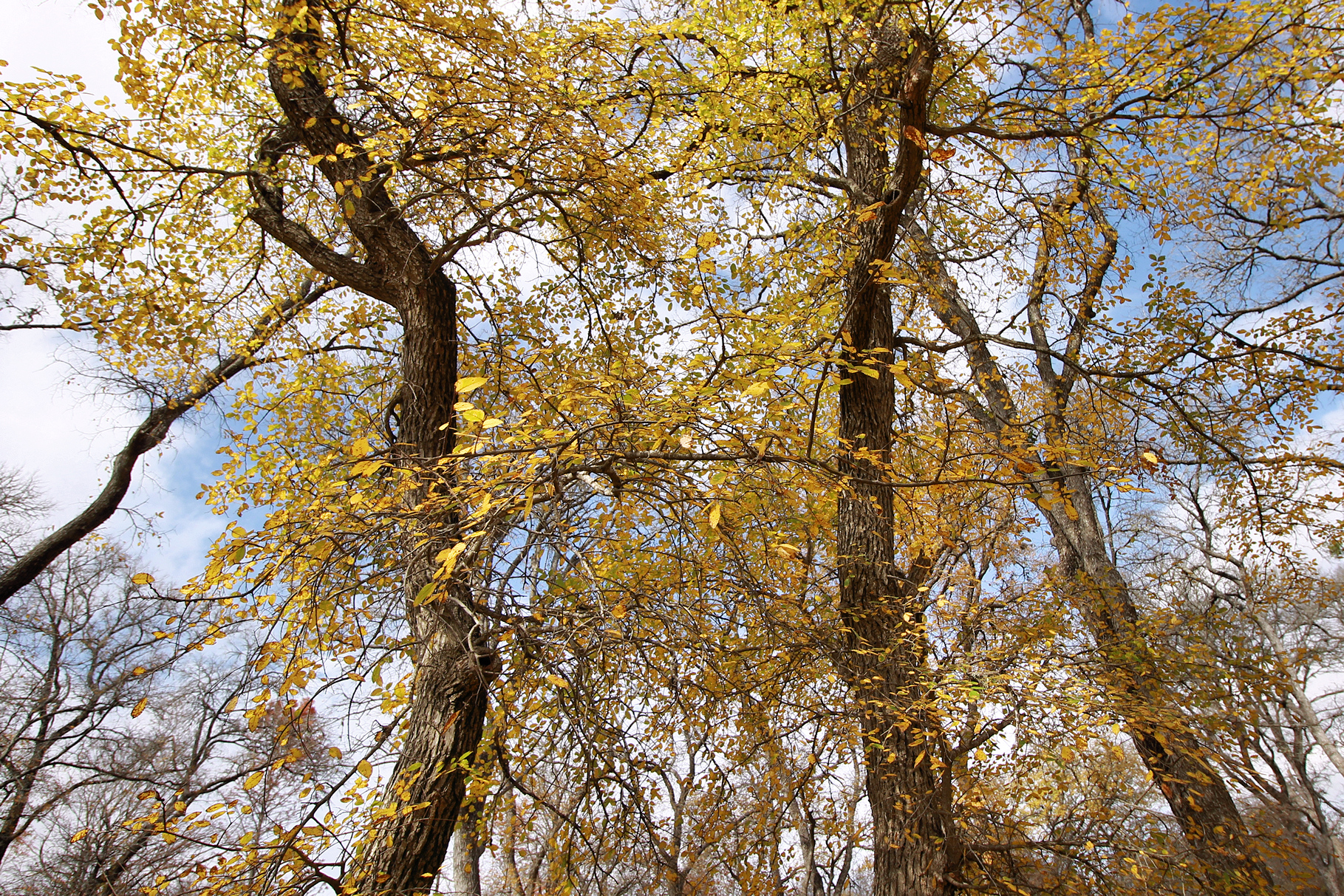
Cedar elm trees showing their fall color.

=== Animals ===
White-tailed deer are common throughout the park, as well as common raccoon, Mexican long-nosed armadillo, coyote, eastern cottontail and eastern fox squirrel. Many bird species are found in the park such as the northern mockingbird, northern cardinal, greater roadrunner, Carolina wren, scissor-tailed flycatcher, painted bunting, Carolina chickadee, blue jay, killdeer, mourning dove and wild turkey. Snowy Egret and Yellow-crowned night heron have also been spotted in the park. Areas in and around the creeks are inhabited by the Guadalupe spiny softshell turtle, red-eared slider, alligator snapping turtle and Blanchard's cricket frog. Many species of snakes such as the Diamondback watersnake, plain-bellied watersnake, Texas blind snake, Texas coral snake and western diamondback rattlesnake are also found.

=== Plants ===
Bald Cypress, American sycamore and pecan trees line the banks of Onion Creek and Texas live oak, Buckley's oak, ashe juniper, cedar elm and honey mesquite can be found on the drier uplands. Other trees found in the park include common hoptree, Texas persimmon, chinaberry sugar hackberry and Mexican Plum. In spring, the roads are lined with flowers, dominated by the Texas bluebonnet. Texas paintbrush, Agarita, Firewheel and Wild Petunia are a few of the other flowering plants in the park. Cacti can also be found such as the Prickly Pear and Christmas cholla.

== Activities ==
Some things to do in the park are camping, hiking, cycling, geocaching, bouldering, picnicking, fishing and swimming. In spring, it is a popular pastime in Texas to take photographs with bluebonnets. McKinney Falls has a bluebonnet meadow with a dedicated mowed path for observation and photography. The path is to avoid both trampling of the flowers and rattlesnakes, which like to hide among the blooms.

== Pollution ==
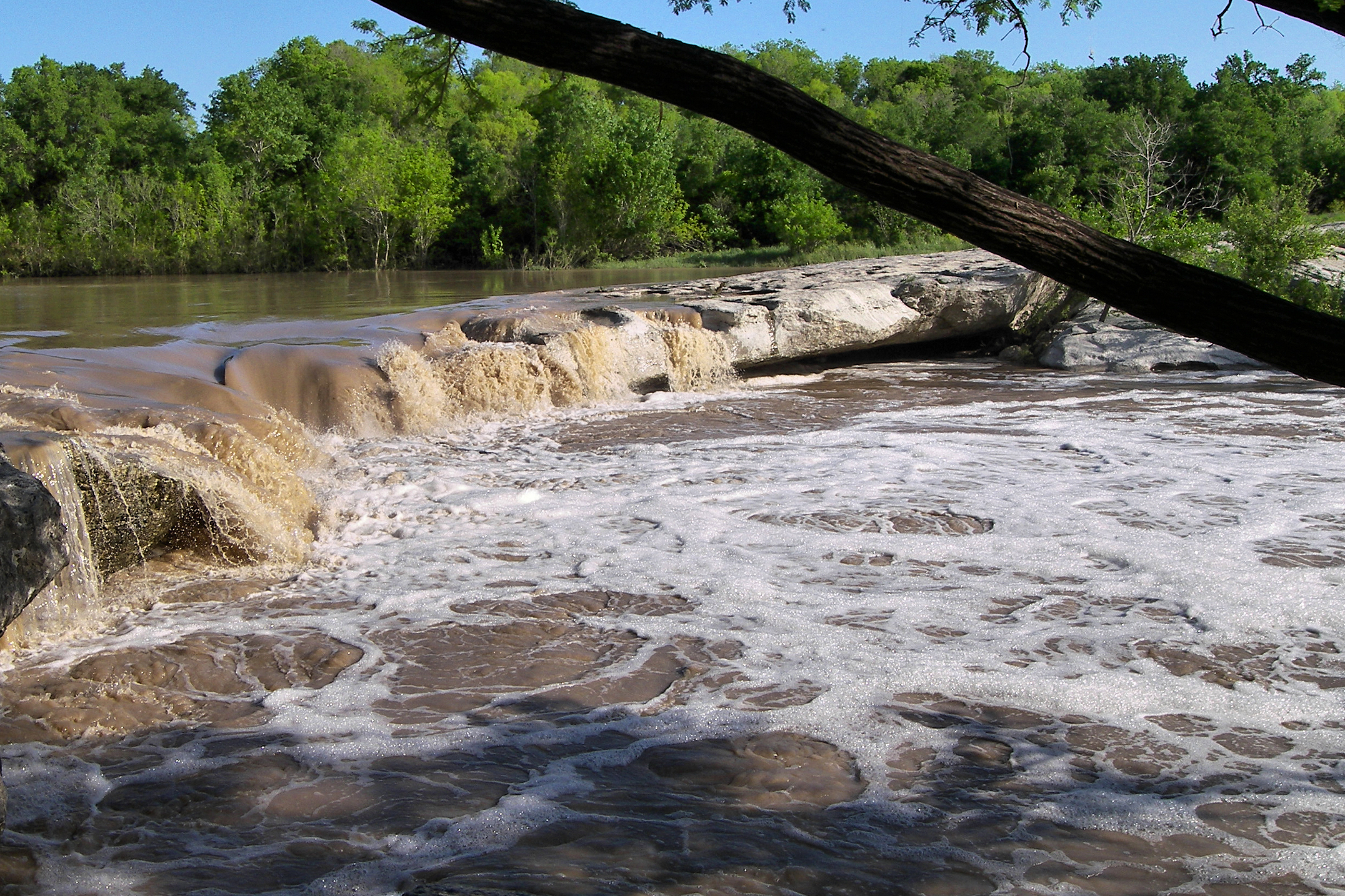
Heavy rains bring runoff from the urban area upstream into the park.

The park was a popular spot for swimming from the day it opened. In April 1981, swimming in the park was banned when several elementary school children complained of cramps and nausea after swimming in Onion Creek. Testing indicated the fecal coliform count in the water was 2600 per 100 milliliters of water, well above the 200 count maximum deemed safe for swimming.

The problem was blamed on rain water runoff from the mostly urban area located upstream on Onion and Williamson Creeks. The run off dumped animal waste, oils, dirt and debris into the creeks. Another contributor was the Williamson Creek Wastewater Treatment Plant. The plant would occasionally dump effluent in various stages of treatment into Williamson Creek if there was equipment failure. By 1982, the plant was overloaded by the rapid growth of the city and regularly discharged effluent into the creek, not all of which met state standards for discharge.

Twelve years later in June 1993, the park ban on swimming was finally lifted. This was due to the closure of the Williamson Creek Wastewater Treatment Plant in 1986, Austin's enactment of a comprehensive watershed ordinance and starting a citywide hazardous chemicals collection program. Swimming is still often restricted because of high fecal coliform counts, usually after heavy rains.

== See also ==
- List of Texas state parks
