= Thomas McKinney =

Thomas McKinney may refer to:

- Tom McKinney (1926–1999), Northern Irish rugby union and rugby league player
- Thomas F. McKinney (1801–1873), trader, merchant, and a co-founder of Galveston, Texas
