= Pilot Knob (Austin, Texas) =

Extinct volcano in Texas, United States

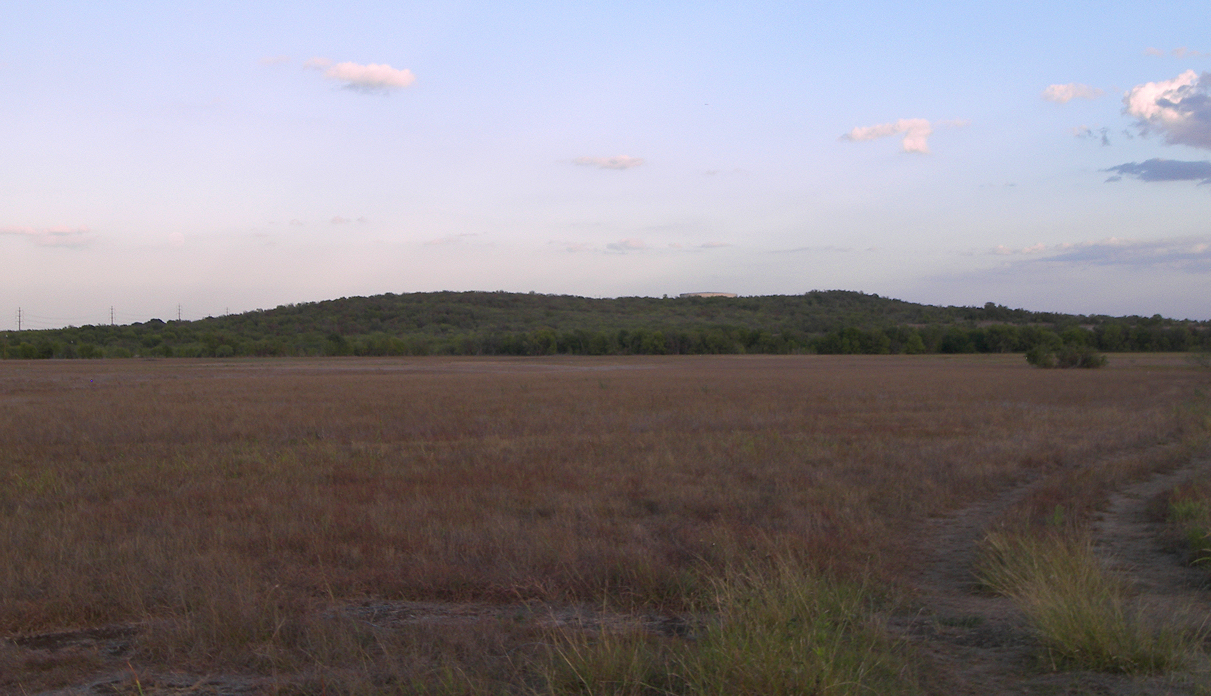
- Pilot Knob rises out of the lowlands west of Cottonmouth Creek

Highest point
- Coordinates: 30°9′44″N 97°42′22″W

Geography
- Location within Texas
- Location: Austin, Texas, United States
- Topo map: USGS

Geology
- Rock age: Late Cretaceous
- Last eruption: 79–83 million years ago

Pilot Knob is the eroded core of an extinct volcano located in Austin, Texas, United States. It is near Austin–Bergstrom International Airport and McKinney Falls State Park.

== Introduction ==
Pilot Knob is one of around 75 late-Cretaceous Period volcanoes scattered around Central Texas from Waco to Austin, San Antonio, and Del Rio. All of these volcanoes have been extinct for millions of years.

The Pilot Knob volcanic complex consists of four small, rounded hills (including Pilot Knob proper) forming the volcano's core area in an area two miles in diameter. The hills are composed of trap rock which is an erosion-resistant, fine-grained mafic volcanic rock. The complex rises above a circular lowland drained by Cottonmouth Creek and is underlain chiefly by volcanic ash and other pyroclastic debris. Several smaller bodies of trap rock occur in the volcanic ash. A topographic rim surrounding the Cottonmouth Creek lowland to the north is formed by sedimentary rock, mainly lithified beach sediments composed of shell fragments and reworked volcanic ash that accumulated in the shallow waters around the volcano.

== History of the volcano ==
In late Cretaceous time, Central Texas was part of a vast marine shelf on which carbonate rocks were deposited with the entire area gradually subsiding as sediments were laid down. The volcano formed when magma worked its way to the surface and encountered water-laden, unconsolidated sediments with the existing water rapidly vaporizing into steam resulting in an enormous explosion that formed an explosion crater. Explosive eruptions continued at Pilot Knob as new magma encountered more water in the volcanic ash. Gradually, an ash cone was built up over the explosion crater. Eruptions of ash continued until the mound grew above the level of the shallow sea. Ash beds, now altered to clay, occur interbedded with limestone and marl of the Austin Group around Pilot Knob; these ash beds provide evidence for subaerial eruptions at Pilot Knob. The Pilot Knob ash cone eventually built an unstable slope on the sea bottom, resulting in mud flows of ash and carbonate mud which tore up the underlying carbonate mud in places and injected itself into the carbonate mud at other places. The subaerial Pilot Knob ash cone allowed the intrusion of magma into the mound without contact with sea water, resulting in quieter lava eruptions. Such magma cooled and solidified to form the core and satellite areas of the trap rock. Some of the trap rock bodies are the erosional remnants of lava flows, due to their apparent dip away from the central core area. Cooling joints exposed on a hill about 1,500 feet (460 m) west of Pilot Knob suggest a dip of that trap rock body towards the center of the core area, possibly indicating that it is the erosional remnant of a cone sheet injected outwards from a central, discordant intrusive body of magma. Exposures at other bodies of trap rock are not generally good enough to determine their exact emplacement, but some, at least, are probably plugs of solidified intrusive magma. Magnetic anomalies on the northeast flank of the core area suggest a buried trap rock body within the ash mound, possibly a cone sheet or lava flow.

As volcanic activity diminished, beaches developed around the volcano. One such beach deposit, now lithified and resistant to erosion, extends several miles to the north of the volcano. It appears along Onion Creek, where it is responsible for both Upper and Lower McKinney Falls. The entire shelf continued to subside after volcanic activity ceased, and muds of the Taylor Group gradually covered the entire volcano. During the Tertiary era, the central Texas area was uplifted, exposing the volcano as younger sedimentary rocks were eroded from the Cretaceous volcanic rocks. Today the terrain at Pilot Knob reflects the relative resistance to erosion of the different rock types that appear around the volcanic complex.

== Dating the volcanic activity ==
Two different approaches have been used by geologists to date the volcanism at Pilot Knob. The first approach was through the stratigraphy of the rocks at and around Pilot Knob and the fossils they contain. The second approach was by isotopic age dating of the igneous rocks. The two means are very different, but supplement each other nicely.

=== Stratigraphy ===
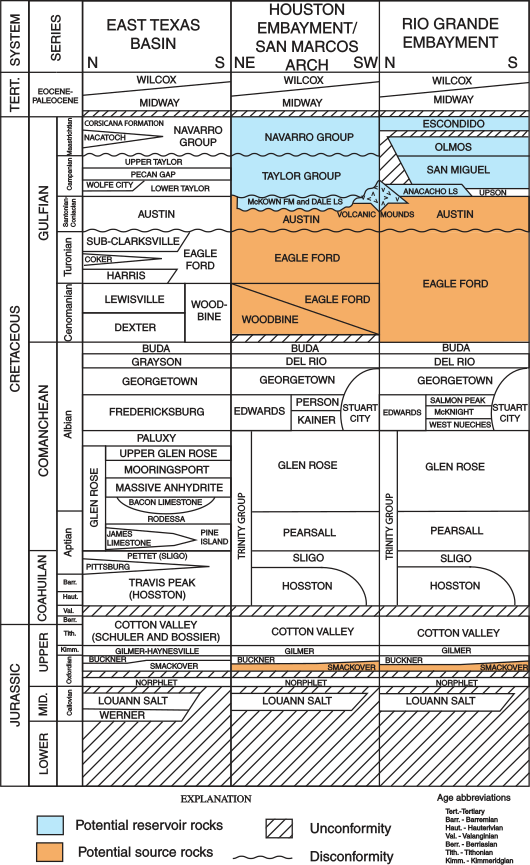
Austin Chalk, volcanic mounds, and McKown Formation stratigraphic column in Texas

The volcano at Pilot Knob exerted a profound influence on the stratigraphy of the Upper Cretaceous sedimentary rocks of the Austin area. The volcanism occurred during the deposition of the upper part of the Dessau and the Burditt formations of the Austin Chalk. These strata are only about one-third as thick near Pilot Knob as they are in other localities around Austin. The faunal zones of the two formations, that is zones within the formations where certain fossils are particularly abundant, are also telescoped in the vicinity of Pilot Knob. Two beds of altered ash occur within the Dessau Formation on Rinard Creek near Pilot Knob. The exact relationship of the beach rock of the northern flank of Pilot Knob with the normal Austin Chalk has been demonstrated to be part of the Exponderosa erraticosta zone, although it may extend down to an age equivalent to the upper part of the Dessau in some areas along Onion Creek. The beach rock is now known as the McKown Formation of the Austin Chalk. Because the volcanism at Pilot Knob occurred during the deposition of the Dessau and Burditt Formations, an age of Lower Campanian (83 to 79 million years BP) can be interpreted for the volcanism according to the ages of the formations in the Austin Chalk, correlated to radiometric dated sections in the Rocky Mountain Region.

=== Isotopic age ===
The potassium-argon method was utilized to determine the age of volcanism at Pilot Knob. This method is based upon the decay of the radioactive isotope of potassium (potassium 40) to argon 40, an isotope of argon, an inert gas. By knowing the concentration of potassium in a rock mineral and the amount of argon gas produced by radioactive decay trapped within the minerals, an age can be assigned to the rock because the decay rate of potassium 40 to argon 40 is known from experimental work. The age of Pilot Knob volcanism dated through the potassium-argon method is 79.5 +/- 3 million years, and agrees with the age derived by correlation with fossils to other radiometrically dated deposits.

== Source of the magma ==
The igneous rocks of the Pilot Knob volcano have not, as yet, undergone rigorous petrological study, although such studies are in progress. Similar rocks near Uvalde, Texas, of about the same age, have been studied. The Uvalde rocks are of the same igneous province as the Pilot Knob rocks; both are centers in a chain of volcanic and intrusive complexes that parallel the buried Ouachita structural belt in central and south Texas. The Ouachita belt may have provided a zone of crustal weakness where magma could rise from great depths through the crust to the surface.

Two types of magma have been determined to have generated in the Earth's upper mantle by partial melting of mantle rocks. One of these magma types is basaltic in composition, composed of plagioclase, titanium-rich pyroxene, and olivine. The other magma type crystallized to nepheline, melilite, pyroxene, and, in some of the rocks, plagioclase. Some nepheline-bearing igneous rocks contain rounded inclusions of spinel peridotite, an ultramafic rock that may represent fragments of the upper mantle incorporated into the magma during its ascent to the surface. Most of the igneous rocks on the surface probably are not representative of the original magmas formed in the mantle; certain processes, such as separation of phenocrysts from the liquid from which they crystallized have altered their original chemical compositions at depths shallower than the mantle.

By inference, the rocks at Pilot Knob crystallized from partial melts of the upper mantle. Only rocks of the second series have been discovered at Pilot Knob; no basaltic rocks have been located. No mantle fragments have been located in Pilot Knob igneous rocks, but their presence is suspected, and some of the olivine phenocrysts in the rocks may be fragments derived from the upper mantle.

== Location ==
Pilot Knob can be reached by driving south of Austin on Highway 183 past Austin-Bergstrom International Airport. The hill is visible on the right after crossing Onion Creek. A circuit of the volcanic complex can be made by turning right off Highway 183 onto Dee Gabriel Collins Road and heading west to the intersection with McKinney Falls Parkway. Turn left and follow the Parkway to the intersection with Colton Bluff Springs Road, where a left turn leads back to Highway 183. Dee Gabriel Collins closely follows the northern topographic rim of the volcano formed by the escarpment of the Cretaceous beach rock. The lowland is drained by Cottonmouth Creek and underlain by soft, easily eroded volcanic ash and other pyroclastic deposits, and the central core area formed by the resistant trap rock are easily visible to the south of Dee Gabriel Collins. About 2/3 of a mile east of the intersection of Bluff Springs Road with McKinney Falls Parkway, the trap rock of south Pilot Knob crops out along the road. This rock is very similar to that which forms the center of the volcano, and may represent the eroded remnant of a lava flow erupted along the flanks of the volcano or having flowed down the south side from the apex.

Except for the road margins, Pilot Knob volcano lies entirely on private land.

== In popular culture ==
The second season of the American procedural drama television series 9-1-1: Lone Star featured a scenario where Pilot Knob reactivated, and the characters' attempts at saving lives as a result of the eruption.
