= Dickens on the Strand =

Dickens on the Strand is an annual Christmas festival organized by the Galveston Historical Foundation in Galveston, Texas occurring the first weekend in December.

Established in 1974 and set against the historical backdrop of Galveston's Strand, participants come to witness and relive the Charles Dickens era. Saturday features a parade featuring Queen Victoria and there is a costume contest on Sunday. Participants dressed in Victorian fashion are admitted for half price. Admission also includes access to the Elissa, a merchant vessel built in 1877.
