= Galveston Historical Foundation =

American historical association

- Legal status: Non-profit
- Purpose: Promoting and preserving the history of Galveston, Texas
- Origins: 1871
- Website: www.galvestonhistory.org
- Formerly called: Galveston Historical Society

The Galveston Historical Foundation is a historical society based in Galveston, Texas.

== History ==
The organization was formed in 1871 as the Galveston Historical Society by a group of 12 men who wanted to preserve the written documents and printed items of the city and region. The group oversaw a collection that was stored at the Rosenberg Library beginning in 1906, becoming library property in 1931.

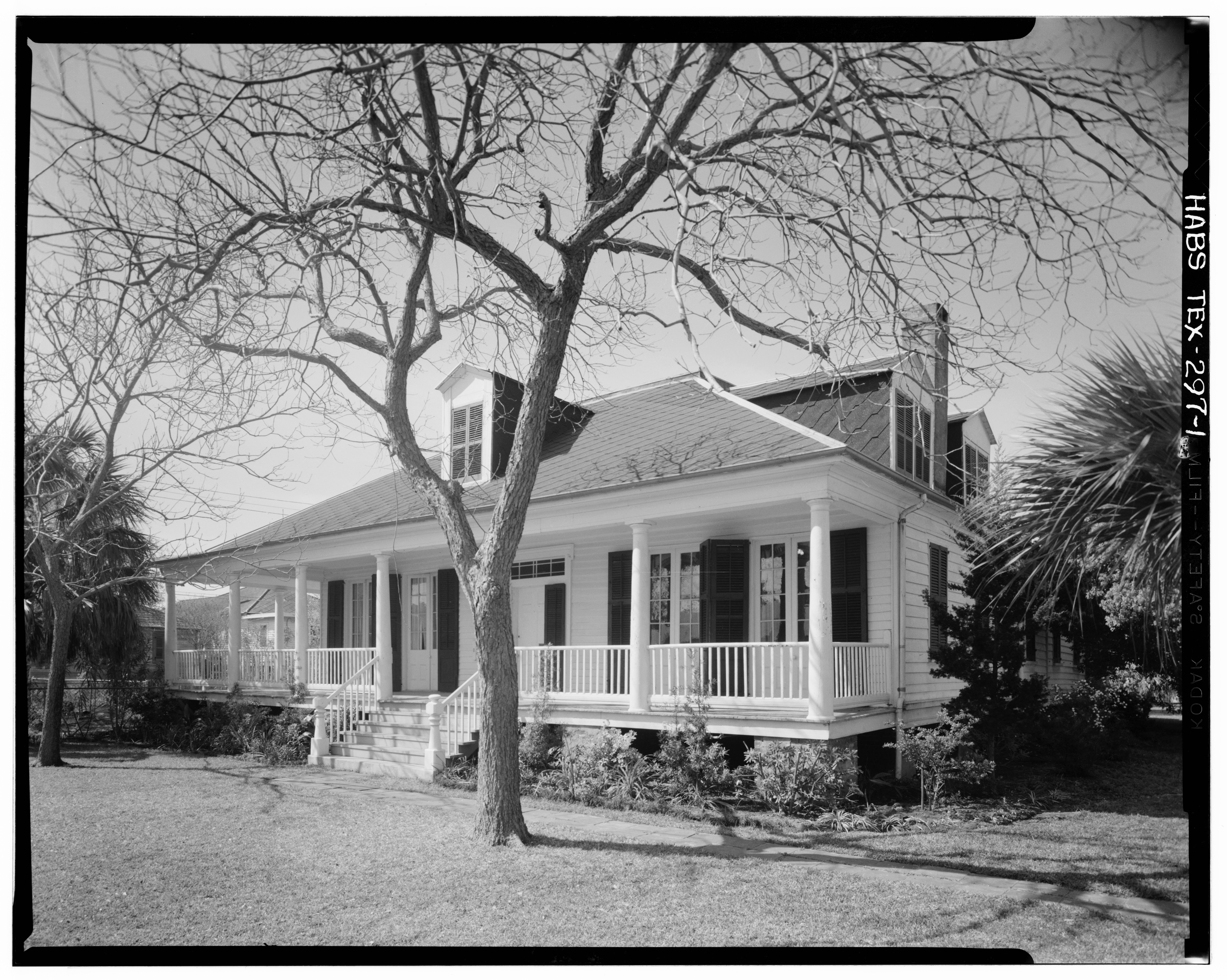
The Samuel May Williams House, which was the Galveston Historical Foundation's first preservation effort

The historical society was revived in 1942, when they began working on a booklet of Galveston's historic houses, which was published in 1951. A few years after that, the historic Samuel May Williams House was threatened with demolition, which prompted the group to buy it. They formed the Galveston Historical Foundation, which purchased and restored the house, and later merged with the society in 1961.

With help from the Moody Foundation and others, the Historic American Buildings Survey hired John C. Garner to begin a survey of the island's structures in 1966. Garner and his team documented the city's eastern third and identified a large number of significant structures still standing that he considered worth preserving. Following that, the society launched a grassroots campaign to promote local history and increase support for area preservation.

After the completion of the historic survey and the signing of the National Historic Preservation Act, the Galveston Historical Foundation took on the role of a coordinator for historic preservation in Galveston. After the sudden announcement that Ashton Villa was to be sold or demolished in 1968, the foundation rallied to raise support for purchasing it from the Shriners and preserve the building. After a contentious bidding process, the foundation convinced the city of Galveston to institute zoning requirements that protected the structure until the two sides could reach a deal to sell the structure to the historical foundation in 1971.

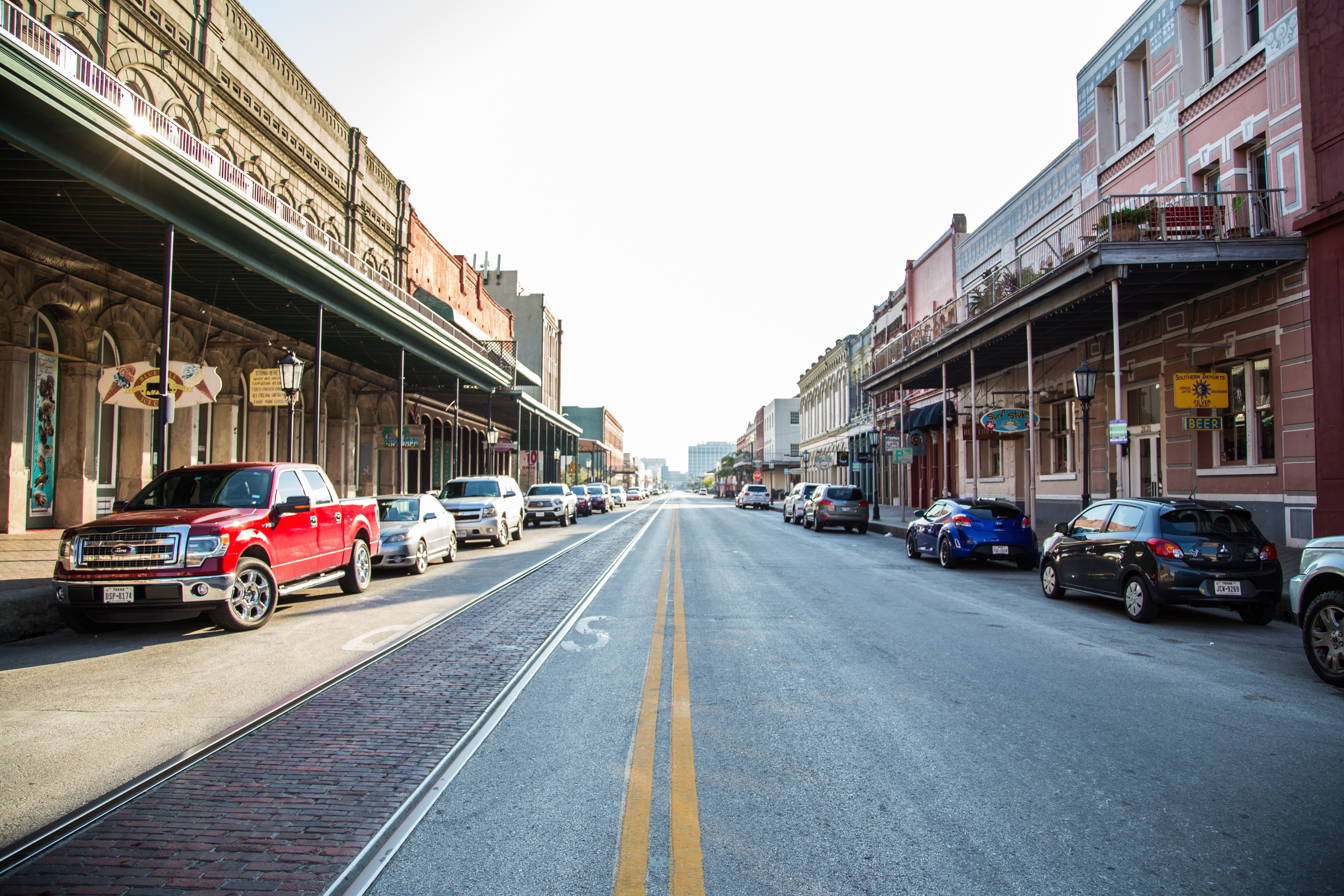
Galveston's Strand district, seen in 2017

The foundation developed a historic district plan, which would eventually create the East End Historic District and the Strand Historic District in the early 1970s. Around the same time, the group gained full ownership of the Strand's Hendley Building, which was later converted into the foundation's offices. Peter Brink was named the group's first executive director in 1973 and oversaw multiple projects such as Bicentennial commemoration events, Strand revitalization work, and the foundation of Dickens on the Strand. This event, which was held for the first time in 1974, was a Victorian Christmas-themed day with games, poetry readings, and music.

Starting in the mid-1970s the foundation had been working to purchase and restore the 1877 sailing ship Elissa, which had sailed to Galveston twice in the 1880s and was considered representative of the vessels that had frequented the city's port in the past. As restoration progressed, it became clear that the scope of work required was significantly more extensive than had been believed earlier. After being towed to Galveston in 1979, the ship underwent further repairs before opening to the public in 1982.

Another event that began around that time was the foundation's Historic Homes Tour, which was first held in 1975 and grew in scope over the following years. By 1984 the tour had grown to a two-weekend event, and was considered one of the foundation's top fundraisers. Additionally, the tours helped to highlight Galveston's neighborhoods and the significant architectural features within them.

The foundation offered resources such as a free paint program and recommendations for city preservation loans to help encourage homeowners to preserve and protect their own buildings and neighborhood character. These residential programs included things like a salvage warehouse and restoration demonstration house.

After years of declining visitation, the Samuel May Williams House was closed as a museum in 2007, later to be sold as a private residence. Also in 2007, the Historical Foundation finalized an agreement to take over stewardship of Bishop's Palace from the Archdiocese of Galveston-Houston. The foundation purchased the mansion from the Archdiocese in 2013 and launched an extensive restoration project to improve the building's roof and interiors.
