= Thomas F. McKinney =

Texas entrepreneur and politician

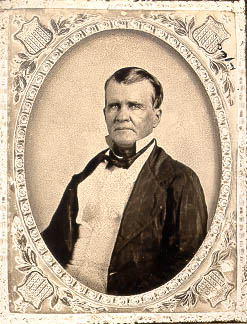
- Born: Thomas Freeman McKinney; November 1, 1801; Lincoln County, Kentucky, U.S.
- Died: October 2, 1873 (aged 71); Travis County, Texas, U.S.
- Citizenship: American, Mexican, Texan
- Occupations: Trader, merchant, rancher
- Spouse(s): Nancy Watts (divorced in 1843), Anna Gibbs (from 1843)

Thomas Freeman McKinney (November 1, 1801 – October 2, 1873) was an American trader, merchant, and a co-founder of Galveston, Texas. Living with his family in the western states of Kentucky, Illinois, and Missouri, he started trading in Mexico in 1823. The next year he settled in Stephen F. Austin's Colony, claiming a headright to Texas land while continuing his trading activities. He established a partnership with Samuel May Williams in 1834, and they operated a warehouse at the mouth of the Brazos River. The McKinney & Williams partnership loaned money and vessels to the cause of Texas independence. After Texas gained independence from Mexico, McKinney co-founded Galveston, Texas, and the McKinney & Williams company set up a warehouse and dock in the new town. McKinney later sold his share of the McKinney & Williams partnership and retired to Travis County, Texas.

== Early life ==
Thomas Freeman McKinney was born on November 1, 1801, in Lincoln County, Kentucky, to Abraham and Eleanor Prather McKinney. His family lived in Christian County, Kentucky from 1811 to 1818. Around 1822, he moved with his family first to southern Illinois, then to Randolph County, Missouri.

== Mexican Texas ==
In 1823, McKinney struck out on his own to Mexico, including stops at Chihuahua City, Durango City, Saltillo, and San Antonio. He received a land grant of a league on the Brazos River in the Austin Colony in 1824. However, he left this area to follow his uncle, Stephen Prather, who operated a trading post near Nacogdoches, Texas. In 1827, McKinney married Nancy Watts, settling in Nacogdoches and operating a store through 1830. She moved to San Felipe de Austin that year while McKinney continued dispatching loads of cotton overland and by water.

McKinney started a mercantile partnership with Samuel May Williams perhaps as early as 1833, acquiring the warehouse of Walter C. White in Brazoria. McKinney was the managing partner of the mercantile business in the spring of 1834 while Williams was still engaged in San Felipe de Austin. A few months later McKinney moved down to the mouth of the Brazos to build a new warehouse near the coast. The partnership formalized as McKinney and Williams operated as commission merchants: they advanced notes or supplies to farmers in exchange for future cotton produce. Starting by moving goods over Texas rivers by flatboard, by 1835, they had acquired three steamships and ran packets between their warehouse at Quintana and New Orleans. McKinney again was the sole manager of the partnership when Williams traveled to Monclova to serve in the provincial legislature.

== Texas independence and the Republic ==
The McKinney & Williams partnership lent $99,000 to the cause for Texas independence. In September 1835, McKinney used his own schooner San Felipe to capture the Correo de Mexico. He borrowed against the credit of the partnership to buy the schooner Liberty in support of the rebellion.

McKinney, with Williams and Michel Menard, were among the original investors in the Galveston City Company. McKinney secured a fifty percent stake in the development on behalf of McKinney and Williams in 1835, and he was one of its incorporators in 1836. McKinney acquired real estate in the new town of Houston. The McKinney and Williams partnership were gifted three city lots on Milam Street at Buffalo Bayou. McKinney invested in Houston outside of the partnership, accumulating city lots and buying a minority share in the Allen brothers' Texas capitol building project.

Acting for the McKinney & Williams partnership, McKinney supervised construction of the new facilities at Galveston in 1838. They established a warehouse in the new city at the northwest corner of 24th Street and the Strand. Their wharf stood at the foot of 24th Street. McKinney and Williams financed the construction of the original Tremont Hotel building at the corner of Post Office and Tremont Streets. In 1839, McKinney supervised the construction of a house for his family, and an identical house for the Samuel May Williams family a few blocks away.

McKinney led a posse in an armed confrontation in 1840 against the mayor of Galveston called the "Charter War." Mayor John M. Allen, a career soldier, absconded with the municipal archives and stored them at his residence, which he guarded with two cannons. Samuel May Williams and other political adversaries of Allen challenged his authority based on the passage of a new city charter. Allen maintained that the previous charter stipulated that his term would continue through 1841. McKinney and his men raided Allen's house and captured the archives, bringing an end to the conflict.

In 1842, McKinney started divesting of his assets in Galveston, starting with the McKinney and Williams partnership. Thomas and Nancy Watts McKinney had separated prior to 1840 and divorced in 1843. He married twenty-one-year-old Anna Gibbs three weeks after his divorce from Nancy Watts. Before he died, McKinney had no kids.

== After Texas annexation ==
Immediately after the formation of the Republic of Texas, McKinney lobbied the government for several years to acknowledge the debt owed to him and his partner. Eventually, in 1844, the firm received a land scrip for more than 108,000 acres. However, he later continued to claim he and Williams had "never been paid by the Government any portion of their advances," with the State of Texas disagreeing.

McKinney served in the Texas House of Representatives in 1849, and was appointed to chair a special committee. That committee's investigations of the state's accounts concluded that the Texas auditor, the comptroller, and the attorney all failed to report under-reporting revenue by private companies. Based on this information, the legislature changed the office of the attorney general from an appointed position to an elected one. McKinney campaigned for Ebenezer Allen's bid to become the first elected attorney general of Texas.

In 1850, McKinney established a ranch on 40,000 acres (16,000 ha) in Travis County that he purchased from Michel Branamour Menard, originally part of the Santiago Del Valle Land Grant, in 1839. He raised livestock and set up a horse track on the property, which later became McKinney Falls State Park. Before the Civil War, McKinney had been an avowed Union supporter while maintaining membership in the Democratic Party. However, he supported the Confederacy when Texas seceded from the United States. The Confederate government appointed him as a cotton agent, and he incurred personal debts while performing this duty, leaving him with an estate diminished to $5,000.

== Death and legacy ==
McKinney died October 2, 1873, of kidney disease. He is buried at Oakwood Cemetery in Austin, Texas. He received a state funeral at the Texas capitol building.

McKinney Falls State Park is named in his honor, although the park itself was donated by the Smith family. Several artifacts from his homestead remain on the park grounds: the ruins of his masonry house, stone walls, a cabin, and a mill.

As much as a successful and important figure, McKinney was a slave owner who owned 30 people by 1863. These slaves built his house on the ranch and farmed for him. Most may have stayed as tenant farmers afterwards. One notable exception was Cary, who served as a messenger for the Texas Army during the Revolution and saved enough money to purchase his freedom in 1839.

McKinney and Williams advanced cash, equipment, and supplies to the cause of Texas Independence. Williams died in 1858, and these debts were still outstanding when McKinney died in 1873. That year, the State of Texas recognized a debt of $17,000 to McKinney, but did not authorize any disbursement. Some of his heirs appealed for payment in 1929 to the Texas legislature, which passed a bill in favor of this claim. However, the bill was vetoed by Governor Dan Moody, and Texas did not approve payment of the debt until 1935.

== Gallery ==
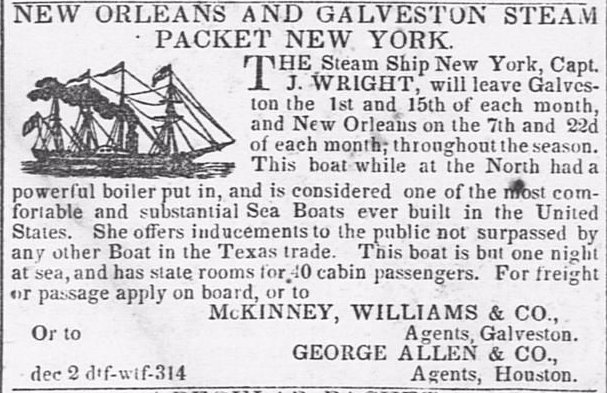
Advertisement for SB New York (via Portal to Texas History)

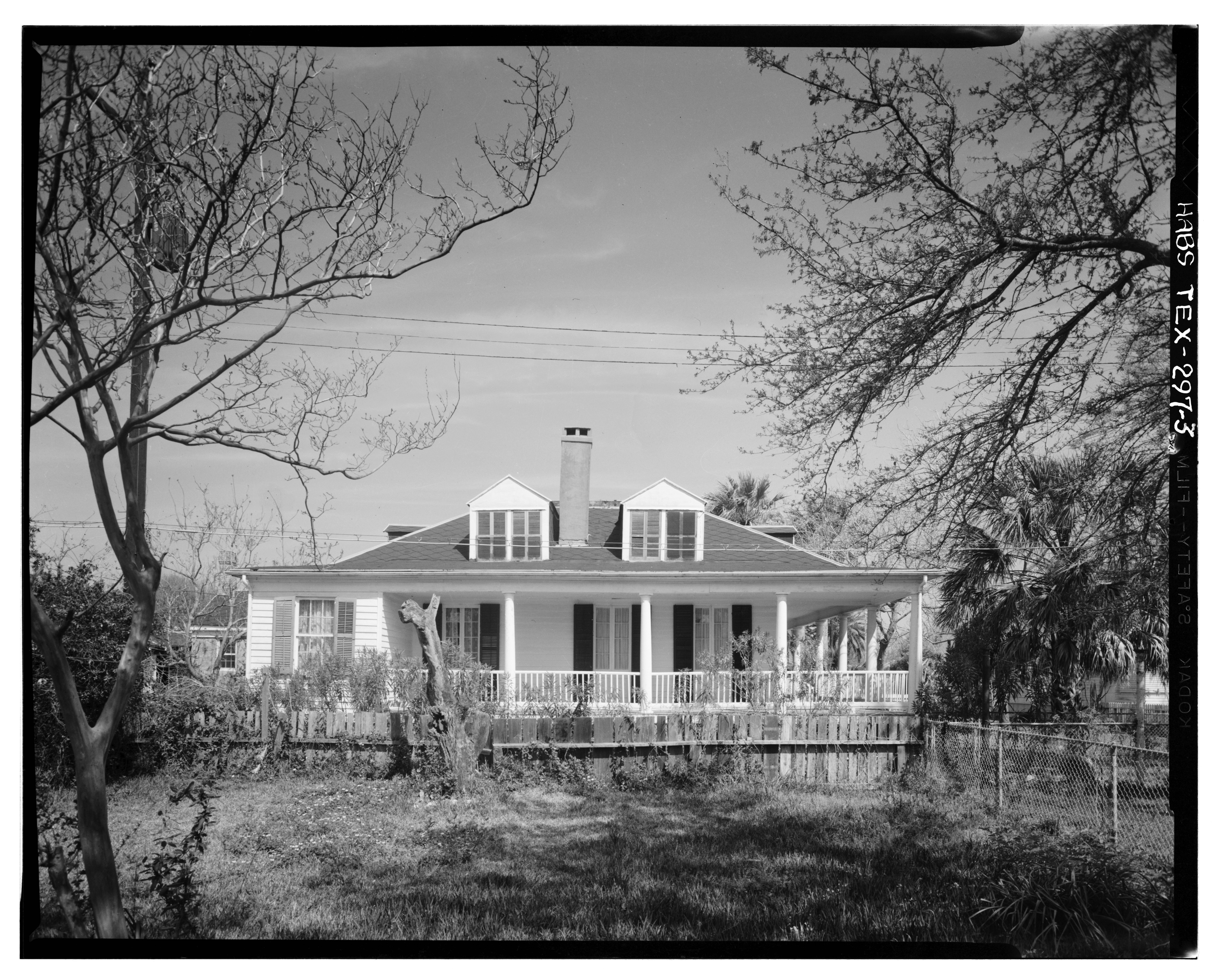
Samuel May Williams House: built by McKinney and identical to his own neighboring house outside of Galveston (not extant)

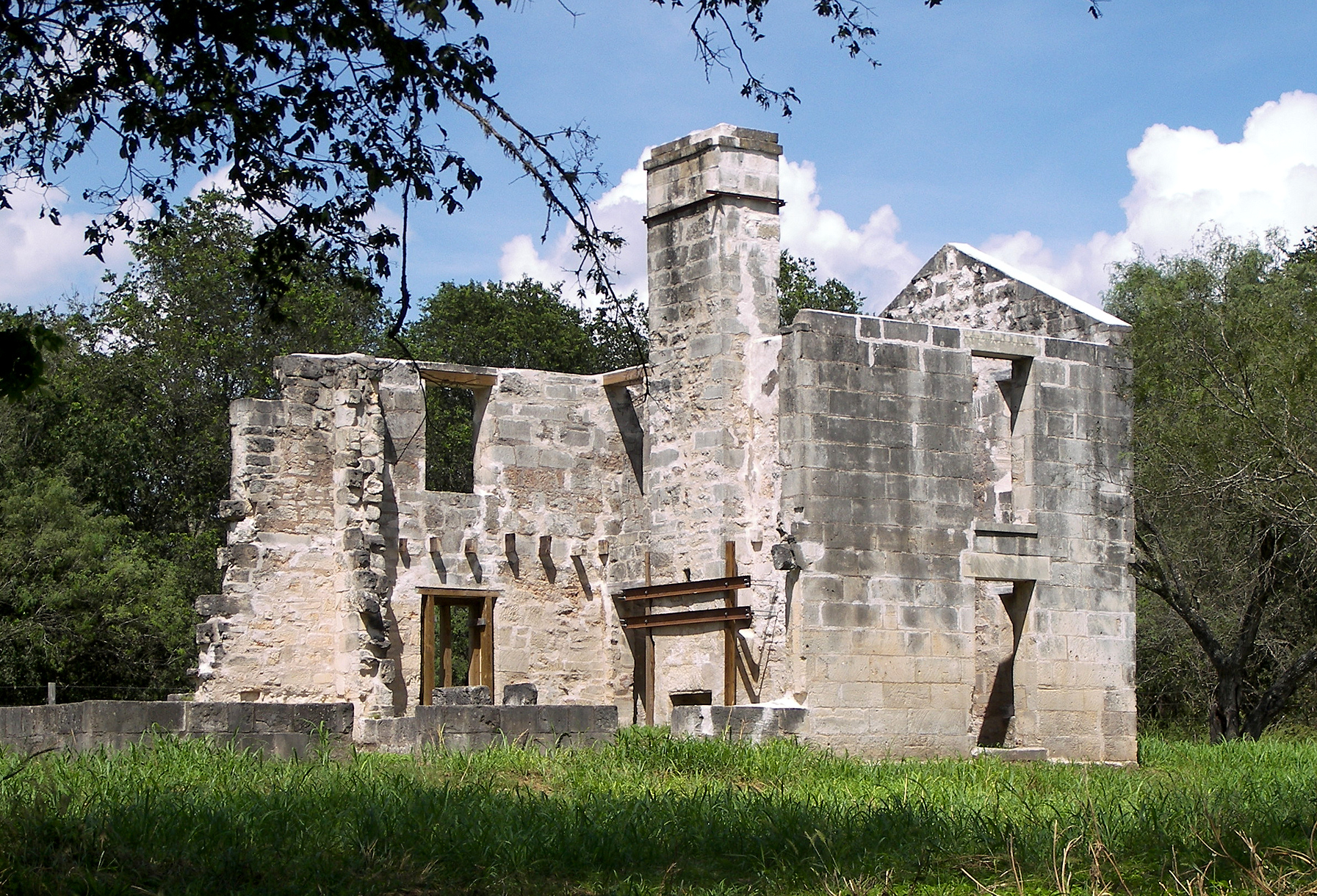
The ruins of the McKinney homestead at McKinney Falls State Park, Texas

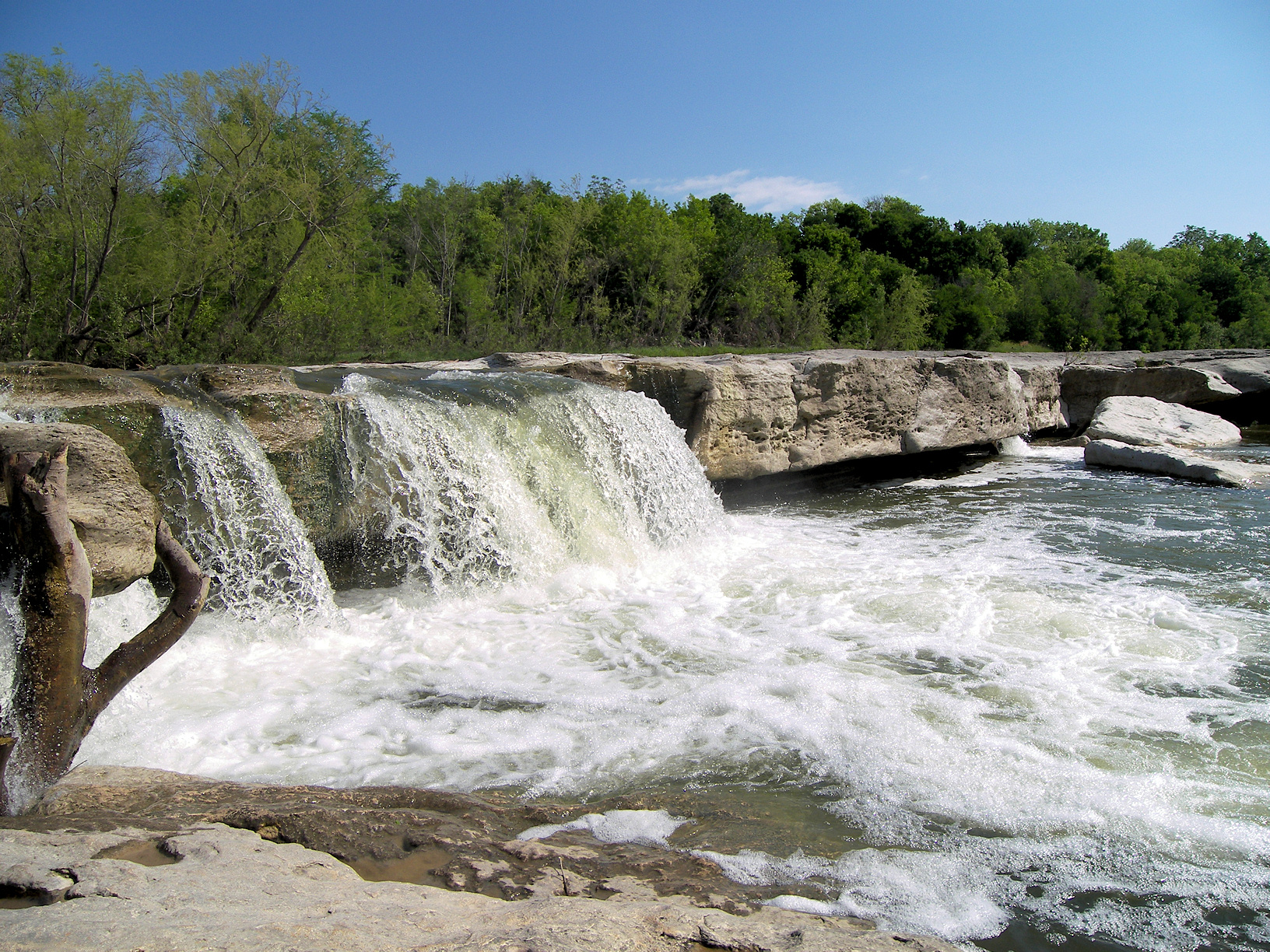
Falls of Onion Creek at McKinney Falls State Park, Texas
