= Elissa (ship) =

Museum ship in Galveston, Galveston County, Texas

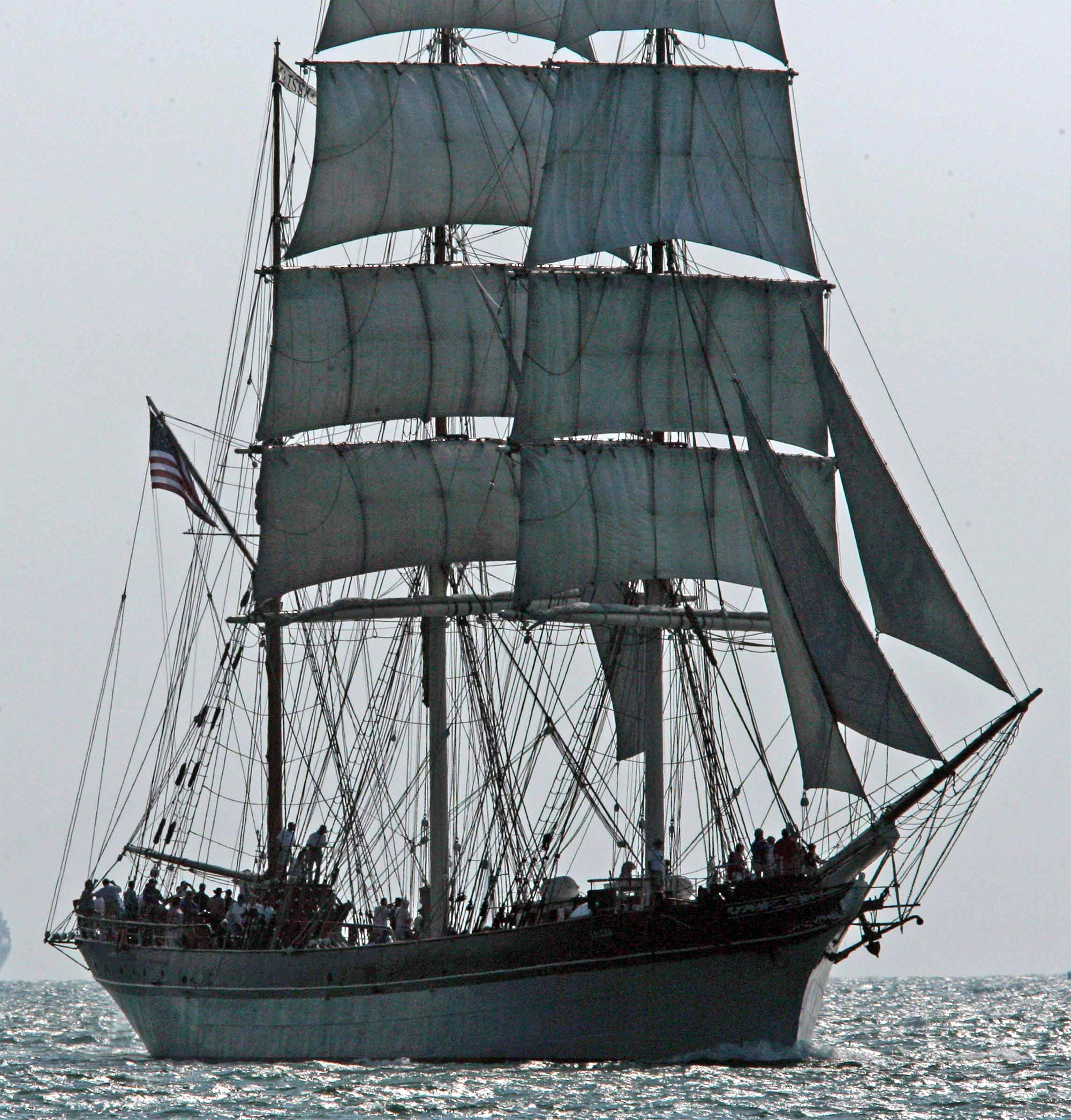
- Elissa

History

United States
- Name: Elissa
- Operator: Galveston Historical Foundation
- Builder: Alexander Hall & Co.; Aberdeen, Scotland
- Launched: 27 October 1877
- Identification: IMO number: 5072060; MMSI number: 367066790; Callsign: WSD3050
- Fate: Training ship

General characteristics
- Tonnage: 431 GRT 409 NRT
- Length: 141 ft (43 m)
- Beam: 28 ft (8.5 m)
- Draft: 10 ft 6 in (3.20 m) .
- Sail plan: three-masted barque, 19 sails
- Capacity: 430 tons cargo
- Elissa
- U.S. National Register of Historic Places
- U.S. National Historic Landmark
- Location within Texas Location within the United States
- Location: Galveston Historic Seaport, Galveston, Texas
- Coordinates: 29°18′34″N 94°47′37″W
- Built: 1877
- Architect: Alexander Hall & Sons
- Architectural style: Three-masted Barque
- Website: 1877 Tall Ship Elissa
- NRHP reference No.: 78002930

Significant dates
- Added to NRHP: 21 March 1978
- Designated NHL: 14 December 1990

The tall ship Elissa is a three-masted barque. Based in Galveston, Texas, she is one of the oldest ships sailing today. Launched in 1877, she is now a museum ship at the Galveston Historic Seaport and was designated a National Historic Landmark in 1990. The Texas Legislature designated Elissa the official tall ship of Texas in 2005.

== History ==
=== Early history ===
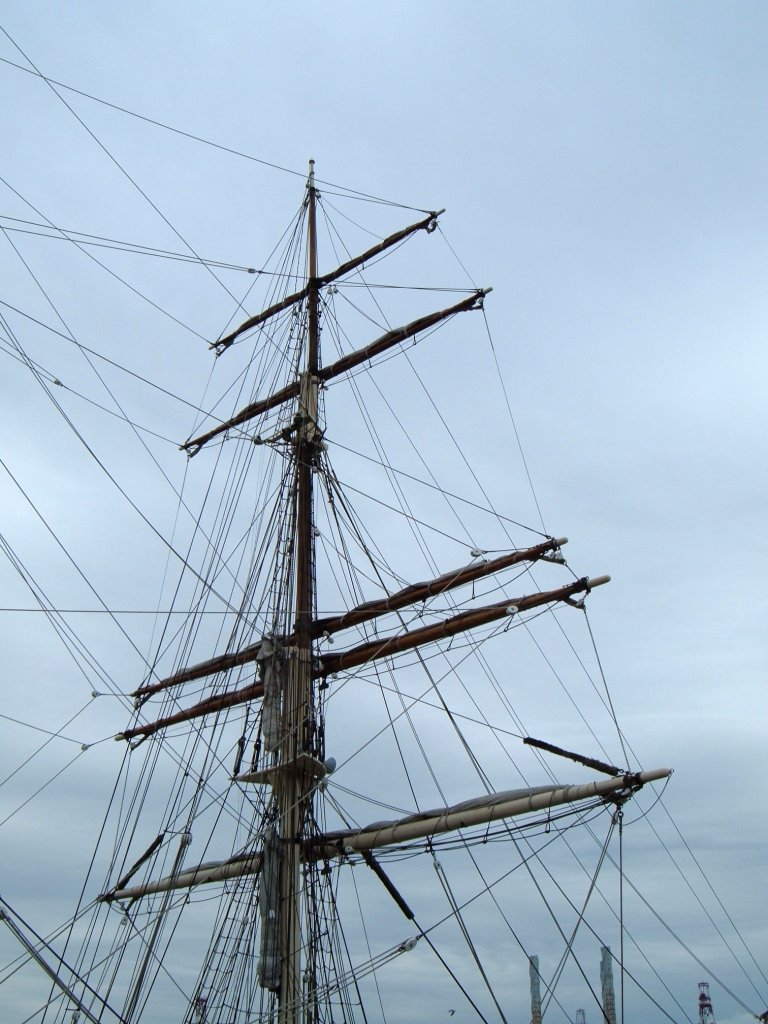
The foremast of the Elissa

Elissa was built in Aberdeen, Scotland, as a merchant vessel in a time when steamships were overtaking sailing ships. She was launched on 27 October 1877. The vessel was named for the niece of Henry Fowler Watt, Elissa's first owner, though according to his descendants, the ship was named for the Queen of Carthage, Elissa (more commonly called Dido), Aeneas' tragic lover in the epic poem The Aeneid.

Elissa also sailed under Norwegian and Swedish flags. In Norway, she was known as the Fjeld of Tønsberg and her master was Captain Herman Andersen. In Sweden, her name was Gustav of Gothenburg. In 1918, she was converted into a two-masted brigantine and an engine was installed. She was sold to Finland in 1930 (owned by Gustaf Erikson to 1942) and reconverted into a schooner. In 1959, she was sold to Greece and successively sailed under the names Christophoros, in 1967 as Achaeos, and in 1969 as Pioneer.

=== Restoration ===
In 1970, she was rescued from destruction in Piraeus after being purchased for the San Francisco Maritime Museum. However, she languished in a salvage yard in Piraeus until she was purchased for $40,000 in 1975 by the Galveston Historical Foundation, her current owners. In 1979, after a year in Greece having repairs done to her hull, Elissa was first towed to Gibraltar. There, she was prepared for an ocean tow by Captain Jim Currie of the New Orleans surveyors J.K. Tynan International. The restoration process continued until she was ready for tow on 7 June 1979.

Elissa has an iron hull, and the pin rail and bright work is made of teak. Her masts are Douglas fir from Oregon, and her 19 sails were made in Maine. She has survived numerous modifications, including installation of an engine, and the incremental removal of all her rigging and masts.

Elissa made her first voyage as a restored sailing ship in 1985, traveling to Corpus Christi, Texas. In Freeport, the crew was joined by seventh-grader Jerry Diegel and Betty Rusk, his history and English teacher, after Diegel won an essay contest on the history of Elissa. A year later, she sailed to New York City to take part in the Statue of Liberty's centennial celebrations. When she is not sailing, Elissa is moored at the Galveston Historic Seaport in Galveston. Public tours are available year-round, provided she is not out sailing. The ship is sailed and maintained by qualified volunteers from around the nation.

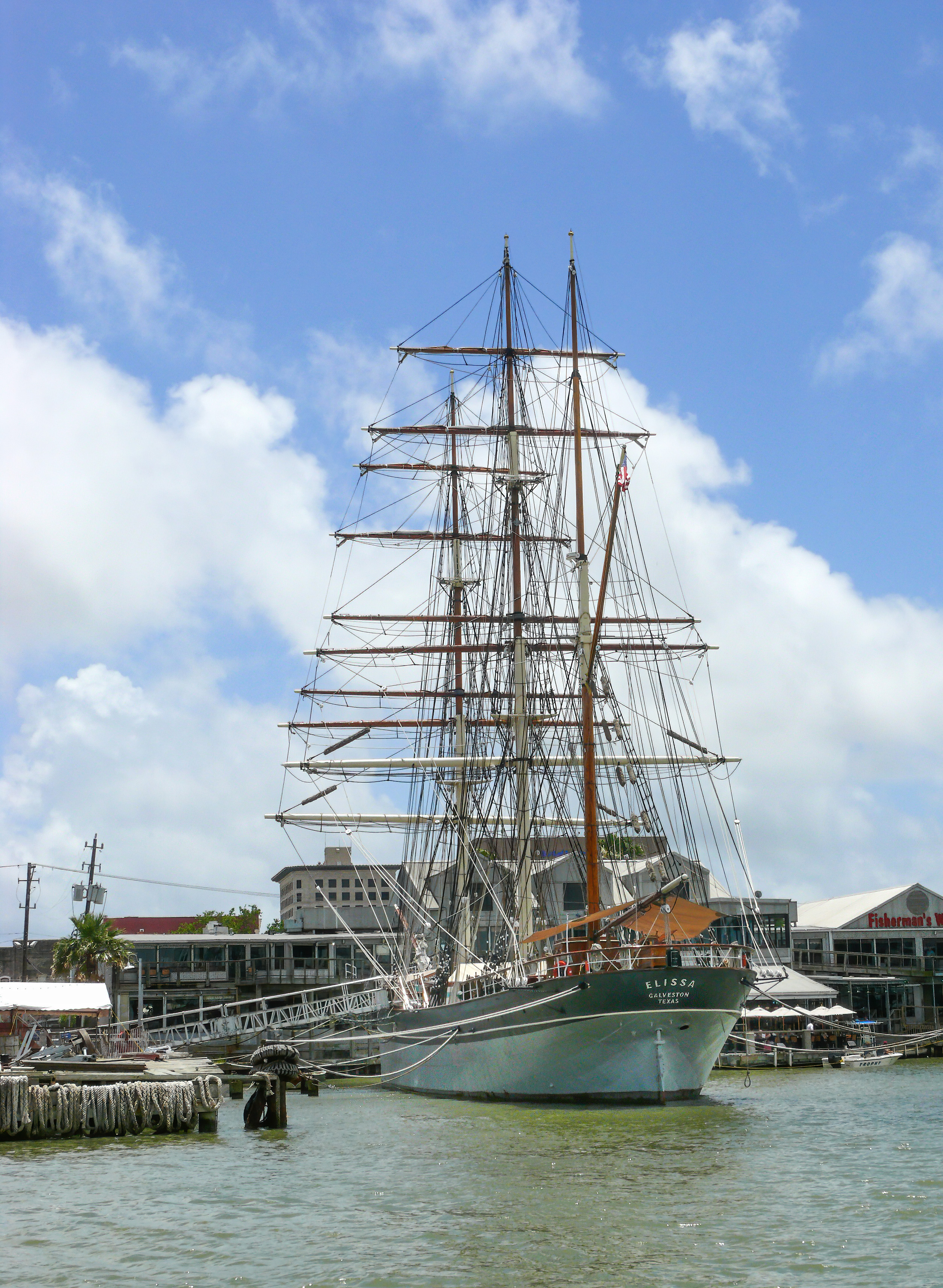
The tall ship Elissa

In July 2011, the U.S. Coast Guard declared Elissa to be "not seaworthy". The Coast Guard inspection in 2011 revealed a corroded hull. The tall ship is inspected twice every five years, said John Schaumburg, museum assistant director. The 2011 inspection uncovered the worst corrosion since the tall ship was rebuilt in 1982, he said. Texas Seaport Museum raised the $3 million that paid for hull replacement and other long-overdue maintenance projects, finishing in January 2013. The museum also replaced the 22,000 board feet of Douglas fir decking and built new quarterdeck furniture out of high-quality teak. Elissa returned to sailing once again in March 2014. She runs a series of daily sails for a period of two to three weeks out of her home port of Galveston each spring.

Elissa remains one of the world's oldest sailing hulls still in operation. The oldest is the coasting schooner Lewis R. French, launched in 1871 in Christmas Cove, Maine.

== Honors ==
- National Register of Historic Places - first object granted this status while outside United States territory
- National Historic Landmark
- Named Texas' state tall ship by act of legislature in 2005

== See also ==
- List of National Historic Landmarks in Texas
- National Register of Historic Places listings in Galveston County, Texas
