= Michel Branamour Menard =

Canadian-born trader and founder of Galveston, Texas

Michel Branamour Ménard
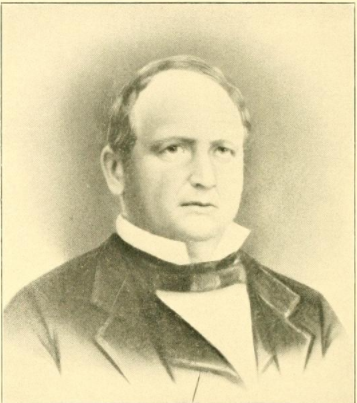
- Michel Branamour Ménard

Member of the Lower House, Congress of the Republic of Texas, Galveston County
- In office 1840–1841

Personal details
- Born: Michel Brindamour dit Ménard; December 5, 1804 La Prairie, Quebec, Canada
- Died: September 2, 1856 (aged 51) Galveston, Texas, U.S.
- Spouses: Marie Diane Leclerc (m. c.–1833); Adeline Catherine Maxwell m. 1837–1838); Mary Jane Riddle (m. 1843–1847); Rebecca Mary Bass
- Occupation: Trader, merchant, real estate developer

Michel Branamour Menard (1805–1856) was a Canadian-born trader and merchant, first active on the upper Mississippi River and later in Texas. He co-founded Galveston, Texas and represented Galveston County in the Congress of the Republic of Texas.

His Galveston home is listed on the National Register of Historic Places.

== Early life ==
Michel Brindamour dit Ménard was born on December 5, 1804, at La Prairie, Quebec, Canada, to Michel Brindamour dit Ménard and Marguerite Desnoyers dit Desmarais. He was already working at a young age as an engagé at the Detroit post of the American Fur Trading Company. He spent most of two years conducting business in Minnesota. An uncle, Pierre Ménard, recruited him to trade furs at Kaskaskia starting in 1822. The young Ménard received a francophone education. Later he learned English, but spoke with his native French accent throughout his life. Still working for his uncle, he moved to the Ste. Genevieve area, where he traded and lived with a local band of Shawnee. He followed the Shawnee south to the White River, and in 1828, crossed with them into Mexican Texas along the Red River.

== Career ==
=== Trading in Mexican Texas ===
Menard applied for Mexican citizenship on December 1, 1829, at Nacogdoches, where he established a base for his fur trading operations. He opened a sawmill in 1833, and by 1834, he had accumulated various tracts of land along the Trinity and Red Rivers amounting to about 40,000 acres (16,000 ha). His trading reached as far south as Saltillo, Mexico, and he continued to send goods north on the rivers to the American Fur Company.

=== Founding of Galveston ===
Menard founded the city of Galveston, Texas, after a series of events between 1833 and 1838. In 1833, Ménard represented Juan Seguín, securing for him a Mexican headright. Seguín received a grant from the Monclova government amounting to about 4,605 acres of land at the east end of Galveston Island. On October 3, 1836, after Texas Independence, Ménard sold the land to Thomas F. McKinney on behalf of Seguín. Then, in order to settle the legality of Seguín's original ownership of the land, Ménard led a group of ten men who were petitioning the Texas government to recognize the 1833 conveyance of the Galveston Island land from Mexico to Seguín. On December 9, 1836, the Republic of Texas agreed to confirm the conveyance in exchange for $50,000 in cash or merchandise. The next day, McKinney sold the land to Ménard. David White acted as an agent to receive payments from Ménard on behalf of the Republic of Texas. White claimed that Ménard made the payments, but it is not clear about the form of the payments and how much, if any, was forwarded to the Republic of Texas.

John D. Groesbeck completed his orthogonal plan for Galveston in 1838. He named the east–west streets according to letters from the alphabet, and used ordinal numbers for north–south streets, though many of these streets were renamed. Ménard helped to organize the Galveston City Company, which began selling lots on April 20, 1838. Seven hundred lots sold in the first year, populated by over one hundred buildings and sixty families.

=== Politics ===
Ménard was a delegate to the Texas Convention of 1836 and signed the Texas Declaration of Independence from Mexico. In 1840, he served Galveston County in the lower house of the legislature of the Republic of Texas.

== Personal life ==
Ménard was married briefly after 1832 to Marie Diana Leclerc of Ste Genevieve, who died of cholera on May 14, 1833. Late in 1837 he married again, this time to Adeline Catherine Maxwell. She died in Galveston in July 1838, probably of yellow fever. He wedded two more times, first to Mary Jane Riddle in 1843, and she died in 1847. His fourth and final marriage was to Rebecca Mary Bass. They had one son, and he also adopted her two children from a previous union.

== Death and legacy ==
Ménard died at his home in Galveston on September 2, 1856. He is buried at the Old Catholic Cemetery in Galveston. He is the namesake of Menard County, Texas.

== 1838 Michel B. Ménard House ==
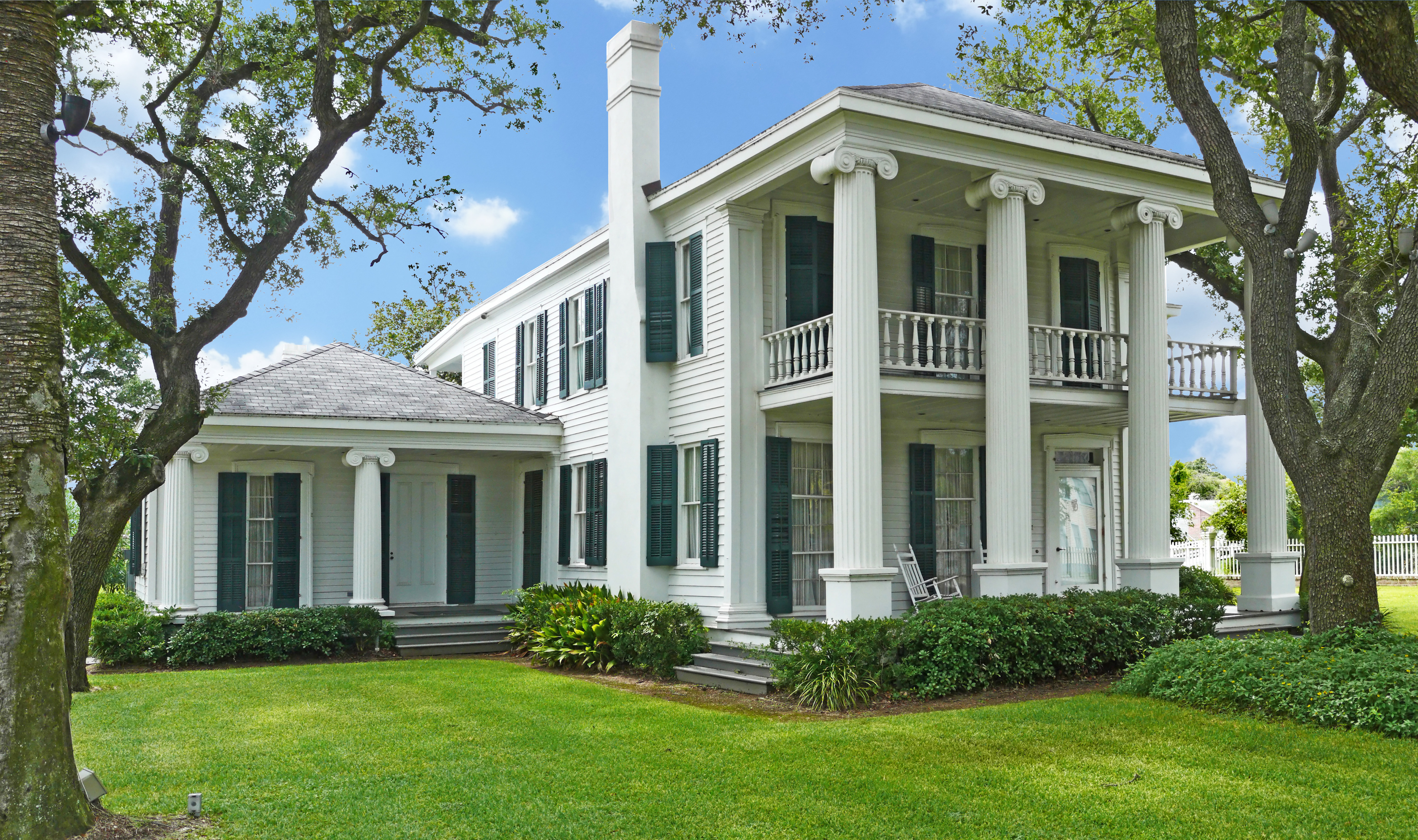
Home of Michel Branamour Menard in Galveston

Ménard commissioned the construction of a two-story, Greek Revival house, then broken down and shipped as parts from Maine. The Michel B. Menard House still stands at 1605 Thirty-Third Street in Galveston. The building is on the National Register of Historic Places. As of 2018, this is the oldest house still standing in Galveston.

== See also ==
- National Register of Historic Places listings in Galveston County, Texas
