= Onion Creek (Texas) =

Coordinates: 30.1403°N 97.7811°W

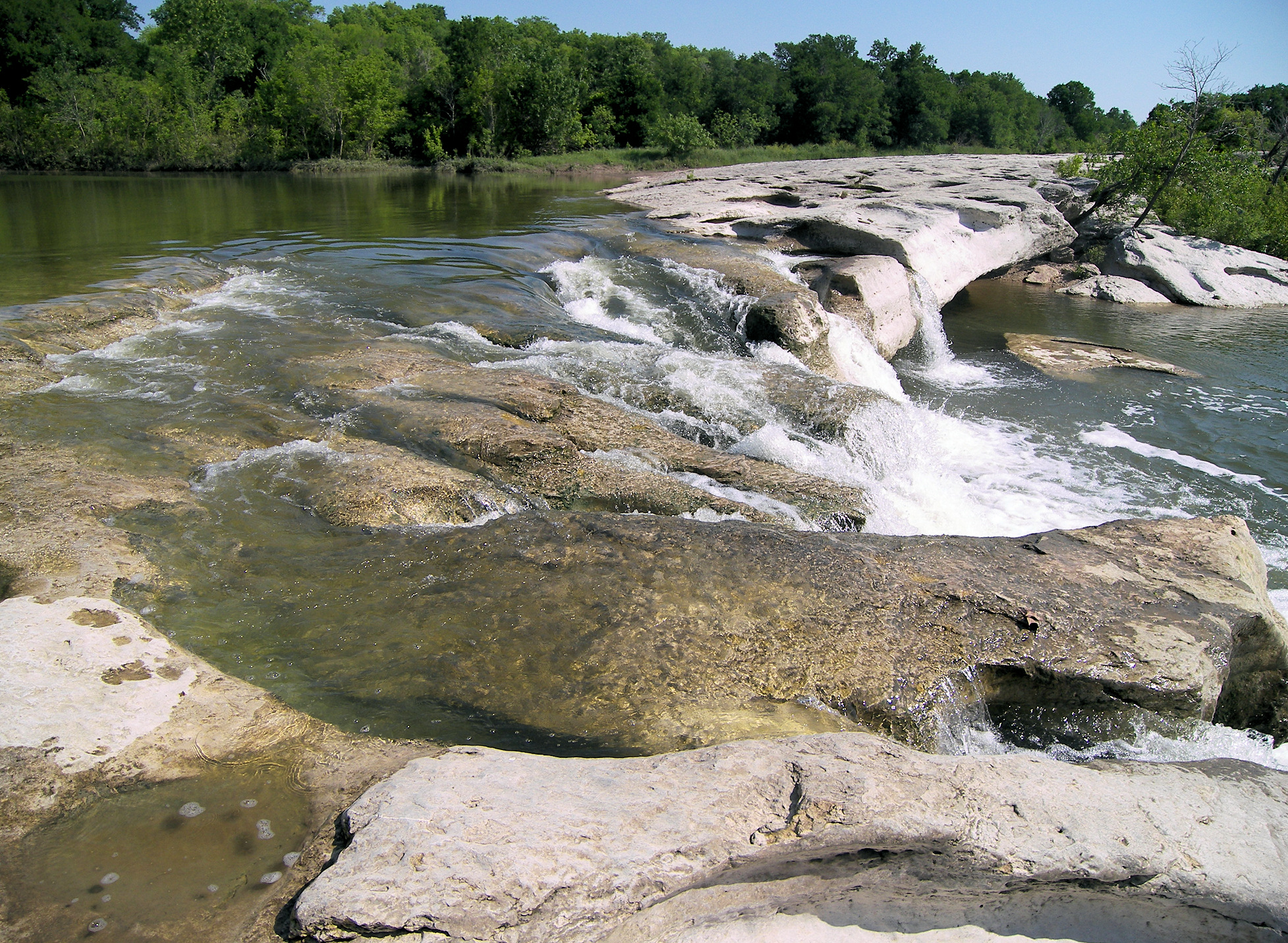
- Onion Creek in McKinney Falls State Park

Location
- Country: United States

Physical characteristics
- Source
  - location: Dripping Springs, Texas
- Mouth
  - location: Colorado River
  - elevation: 374 feet (114 m)
- Length: 79 miles (127 km)
- Basin size: Onion Creek Watershed

Onion Creek is a small tributary stream of the Colorado River in Texas. It begins 12 mi (19 km) southeast of Johnson City, Blanco County, Texas, and flows approximately 79 mi (127 km) eastward into the Colorado River, 2 mi (3.2 km) northwest of Garfield in Travis County, Texas. While areas surrounding the creek's origin in Blanco County are primarily rural, areas closer to its mouth in Travis County run through Austin and are urban and industrial. Passing near Dripping Springs, Driftwood, and Onion Creek, Onion Creek is the source of the waterfalls in McKinney Falls State Park. Onion Creek's watershed spans an area of 211 mi^{2} (550 km^{2}).

== Recreation ==
Austin Parks and Recreation, Travis County and Texas Parks and Wildlife Department manage areas along Onion Creek for public use. These include Onion Creek Metropolitan Park, Onion Creek Greenbelt, Onion Creek Soccer Complex, McKinney Falls State Park, Richard Moya Park, Barkley Meadows Park and Southeast Metropolitan Park.

== 2013 Flood ==
On October 31, 2013, Onion Creek experienced historic levels of flooding, cresting at 40.15 ft, a level not seen since 1921. Over the course of 4h 9-10in of rain fell in the Onion Creek watershed. The flood had a flow rate of over 120,000 cubic feet per second, more than twice that of Niagara Falls.

In the end, five people died and more than 500 homes were damaged by flood waters. As a result of the flood the City of Austin purchased hundreds of homes in the floodplain in 2015. These properties have formed the northern section of the Onion Creek Metropolitan Park since 2019.

The Smith Visitor Center in McKinney Falls State Park was heavily damaged by this flood and again by flooding in 2015. The visitor center did not reopen until 2021.

== See also ==
- List of rivers of Texas
