= Maceo Organization =

Criminal organization

- Founded: c. 1927
- Founders: Sam and Rosario Maceo
- Founding location: Galveston, Texas
- Years active: c. 1920s-1980s
- Territory: Southeast Texas
- Criminal activities: Racketeering, illegal gambling, prostitution, bootlegging, numbers game, bribery, political corruption, electoral fraud, extortion, money laundering, smuggling, and drug trafficking
- Allies: Beach Gang
- Rivals: Downtown Gang

The Maceo Organization, also known as the Maceo Syndicate, was a criminal organization, that ran Galveston, Texas politically and criminally throughout most of Galveston's open era. The organization's bosses, Sam and Rosario Maceo, operated illegal gambling, prostitution, bootlegging and racketeering activities.

== Early years ==
The Maceo brothers got their start by being associated with the Beach Gang, which was under the control of Irish American Ollie Quinn and German American Dutch Voight. They mostly controlled the Beach area of Galveston during the 1910s and 1920s. Their gang was a rival of Johnny Jack Nounes and George Musey's Downtown Gang. However, Dutch and most notably Quinn remained very powerful figures on the island due to the many political connections that reached the Texas State Senate.

== New Regime ==
Soon, Quinn began mentoring Sam and Rosario Maceo. By the late 1920s, as they climbed up the ranks, the two brothers took control and transitioned the Beach Gang into their own personal organization, with Voight and Quinn acting more like partners than bosses. By the 1930s, the brothers eventually ran the Downtown Gang away from operating on the city, and now had complete control over it.

=== The Maceos' empire ===
Sam Maceo expanded the extortion system Quinn had established. He further developed the organization's political connections, establishing ties to prominent political figures, such as Texas Governor James V. Allred, William Lewis Moody Jr. and onetime Galveston Mayor, Herbert Y. Cartwright, eventually emerging as a prominent figure in politics and entrepreneurship himself. After the repeal of Prohibition, Sam capitalized the popularity of gambling in Texas and started building an illegal gambling empire in Galveston City and Galveston County, teaming up with notorious gangsters, such as Moe Dalitz, Frank Nitti and Albert Anastasia, although those figures never operated rackets in the city or county. Maceo was known to be a very well dressed and nice man, whose charisma and ability to influence people were legendary. On the other hand, Rose was the more quiet enforcer type in the family. Their annual income was reported to exceed beyond one million dollars. In the early 1930s, the Maceos backed Frank L. Biaggne for the position of Galveston County sheriff and supported Walter Johnston as city police commissioner. Through his control of many politicians and other elected officials in Galveston County, as well as some in Austin and Washington, Sam Maceo was able to make several improvements to the city and transform it not only into a leading resort city, but also into a major cultural and economical center as well. The brothers also established many clubs and casinos, including the Turf Club, the Maison Rouge, the Balinese Room and the Hollywood Dinner Club, which was just a small part of the Maceo empire.

== Fertitta Organization ==
After Sam and Rose's deaths in the early 1950s, the brothers were succeeded by the Fertitta Group, who moved the organization to Las Vegas, Nevada, where gambling has been legalized in 1931, and worked in the casino industry. These casino properties included the Stardust, the Tropicana, Circus Circus, the Sahara, and the Fremont, which Frank Fertitta Jr. managed. Frank Jr. also founded Palace Station and Station Casinos which is today one of the largest local casino operators in Las Vegas.

== Known members ==
Bosses

- c. 1927-1951 - Salvatore "Sam" Maceo, (his death)
- c. 1927-1954 - Rosario "Rose" Maceo, (his death)
- c. 1954-1980s - Anthony, Vincent, and Frank Fertitta

== See also ==
- Free State of Galveston
