= Maceo-Dickinson line =

Informal name for county line in Texas

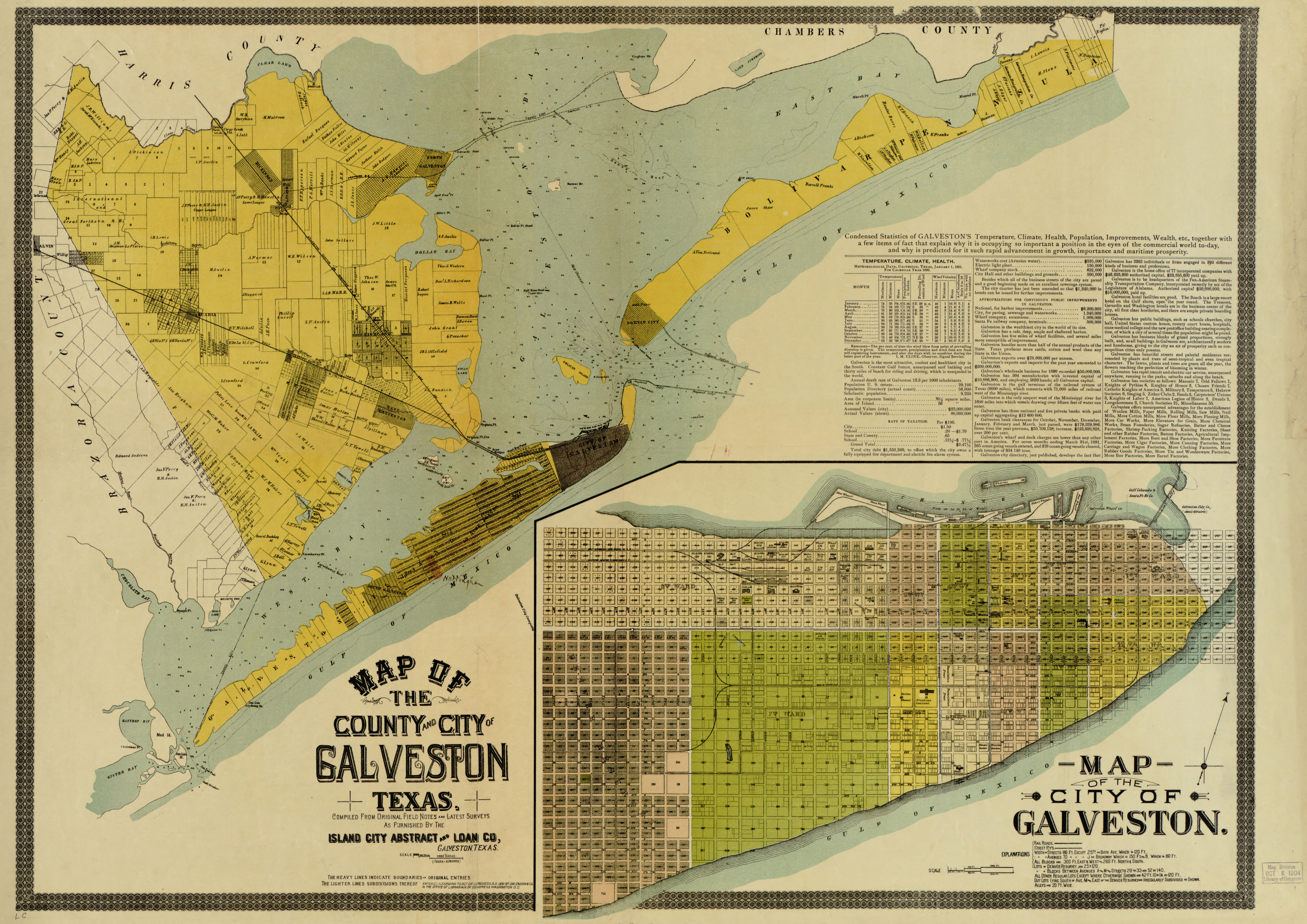
Map of the county and city of Galveston from 1891

The term Maceo–Dickinson line was an informal expression used in Texas during the early to mid-20th century to refer to the Galveston County line where it met Harris County.

The phrase was a pun on the Mason–Dixon line. From the 1920s through the 1950s, the Maceo crime syndicate controlled Galveston, Texas, operating a large gambling empire that extended across much of Galveston County, including casinos in Dickinson, Texas. The county was known for its lax law enforcement, which sharply contrasted with neighboring jurisdictions, particularly in later years.

== See also ==
- Free State of Galveston
- Sam Maceo and Rosario Maceo

== Bibliography ==
- Boatman, Tabitha Nicole (2014). Island Empire: The Influence of the Maceo Family in Galveston (PDF). University of North Texas.
