= Downtown Gang =

- Founded by: Johnny Jack Nounes
- Founding location: Galveston, Texas
- Years active: c. 1920 – 1935
- Territory: Downtown Galveston, Texas
- Ethnicity: Men of various ethnicities
- Membership: Around 20 to 30 members
- Criminal activities: bootlegging, illegal gambling, prostitution, hijacking, conspiracy, assault, robbery, bribery, contract killing, and murder
- Rivals: Beach Gang and Maceo Syndicate

The Downtown Gang was one of the two gangs that dominated the organized crime world in Galveston, Texas, United States, mainly during prohibition. The gang was founded by Johnny Jack Nounes around 1920. The gang became a large profiteer and leader in the Galveston's crime syndicate while fighting for control of the island. The gang operated many night clubs, gambling establishments, and speakeasies along the island.

== Origins and Pre-Prohibition ==
Johnny Jack formed the Downtown Gang around 1920 after prohibition came into effect. They were the rival gang of Ollie Quinn and Dutch Voight's Beach Gang. Before prohibition, Dutch and Ollie usually controlled gambling on the island. The two gangs decided to use Broadway to set the boundaries of their territories. As prohibition was approaching Johnny Jack looked for a partner to get in with him, and so he found a Houston boy by the name of George Musey. Musey, a Syrian who was not even old enough to take drink, was also, like Nounes, from family of immigrants. As the roaring 20s boomed, the gang began to rake in a profit with bootlegging as their main source of income.

== Prohibition ==
Among the gang's suppliers were schooners from Cuba, Jamaica, and the Bahamas. They had money overflowing the cash registers from speakeasies owned up and down Downtown Galveston. The gang was making more money than ever, encouraging them to buy fancy clothing, cars, houses, and food. Some of the gang's popular business partners were the Chicago Outfit's Frank Nitti and allegedly New York Jewish mob boss Arnold Rothstein. Therefore, Nitti became a good business partner of Johnny Jack which created a good connection with the Downtown Gang and the Chicago Outfit. Gangland shootouts was something that came around every once in a while since the gain of the island led to more business. The Downtown Gang sold bootleg hooch and had connections from New Orleans, Louisiana, all the way up to Montreal, Quebec, Canada.

Furthermore, Johnny Jack wouldn't take any nonsense from anybody, he wasn't afraid of a fight. He would even lead the gang into hijacking the Beach Gang's liquor trucks and so gang shootouts were common. Also, George Musey became the gang's top enforcer. He was also a person you didn't want to cross paths with, apparently somebody crossed him and found themselves with their head buried in the ground covered with quick lime. Every now and then for business purposes the gangs would negotiate like the majority of the mob does with their counterparts. Dutch Voight would bring some guys and go on rum-runs with George Musey. However, if business was shady or unreal, they would be back to fighting and war would be declared.

== Decline of the Downtown Gang ==
However, as Nounes served his time in federal prison and Musey was on the run from the law in Canada, the gang was headed at the moment by Big Jim Clark. However Big Jim betrayed the gang by giving the Beach Gang shipments Musey had scheduled. It is assumed that there was a woman involved between the two men which is likely to have caused the tension. However, after Big Jim's betrayal, Fatty Owens took control of the gang and a few weeks later a shootout occurred between the Downtown and Beach Gangs. Members of each gang died in the shootout on Tremont Street. Furthermore, not long after, Fatty Owens would go on to 23rd Street with his assistant Jimmie Crabb to kill Kye Gregory and Mitch Frankovitch, also betrayers of the gang, however Frankovitch survived the shootout with Gregory dying from gunshot wounds. With Nounes in prison, Musey in Canada, Big Jim's betrayal, and Fatty Owens' court trial, there was nobody to lead the Downtown Gang. With all these chaotic incidents happening, it's most likely George's younger brother, Fred Musey, stepped up to the plate as acting boss.

== Post-Prohibition and Defunction ==
After prohibition ended, the long-running organized crime gang eventually fell apart. They operated some night clubs, and continued with gambling, but it eventually came to an end around the mid-1930s. George Musey was assassinated through orders by the Beach Gang's successors, the Maceo Syndicate, which took over much of the island and wielded much more power than the Nounes-Musey mob. The Downtown Gang did not wield the strength like they did back in the old days, and so it eventually deceased. However, Johnny Jack Nounes would go on to make a living operating different clubs and restaurants.

== Historical Leadership ==
Bosses

- c. 1920 – 1930s – Johnny Jack Nounes
- 1920s - 1935 - George Musey, (his death)
  - Acting 1930 - 1931 – Marvin "Big Jim" Clark
  - Acting 1931 - Theodore "Fatty" Owens
  - Acting 1931 - Fred Musey

Lieutenants

- 1920s - 1931 - Marvin "Big Jim" Clark
- 1920s - 1930s - Theodore "Fatty" Owens
- 1920s - 1930s - Harry Giddy
- 1920s - 1930 - Mitch Frankovitch
- 1920s - 1930 - Kye Gregory

Associates

- Francis Nonus
- Fred Musey
- Sam Musey
- J.J. Davis
- H.J. Kriger
- Joe Marrero
- Chris Paul
- Robe Owen
- Lawrence “King Coal” Balkey
- Tom Lera
- Joe Varnell
- Morris "Kid" Ross
- Otis Skains
- Jimmie Crabb
- Harry G.
- T.R. Davis
- George Etie
- Douglas Etie
- Tony Vadello
- Asia Stein
- R.R. Owen
- Charlie Mushmach
- Joe Rees
- Marshall Ballard
- Marion Ballard
- Sam Alena
- Harry Evelt

== See also ==
- Johnny Jack Nounes
- George Musey
- Sam Maceo
- Dutch Voight
- Ollie Quinn
- Frank Nitti
- Free State of Galveston
- Chicago Outfit
