= George Musey =

Crime boss

George S. Musey
- Born: July 17, 1900; Lake Charles, Louisiana, U.S.
- Died: July 25, 1935 (aged 35); Galveston, Texas, U.S.
- Other names: W.B. Brown; One-armed George Musey; The King of Gulf Rum-Runners; Big Chief
- Occupations: Gangster, Mob Boss
- Title: Boss
- Spouse: Mary Abraham Musey (c. 1924–1935; his death)
- Children: Margaret M. Musey (1925); George J. Musey (1928–1992)
- Parent(s): Jamail (Sid) Musey and Sally Musey
- Status: Deceased
- Allegiance: Downtown Gang
- Convictions: 1929
- Criminal charges: Bootlegging
- Penalty: Imprisonment, Atlanta Penitentiary

George S. Musey, also known as "one-armed George S. Musey", was a mob boss in Galveston, Texas, during the Prohibition era. Along with Johnny Jack Nounes, he led the Downtown Gang, one of two gangs which controlled the Galveston underworld until the early 1930s. He was convicted on conspiracy liquor charges in 1929 and sent to Atlanta Penitentiary. Musey was killed by shooting in 1935, eight days after his 35th birthday.

== Early life ==
George S. Musey was born in Lake Charles, Louisiana, one of five children to Jamail and Sally Musey, who had emigrated from Syria in the 1890s. The family moved to Houston, Texas, in the 1910s, and later to Galveston. Musey worked for a time as a mechanic in his father's auto shop. As Prohibition came into effect, Musey is considered to have started associating with Johnny Jack Nounes, with whom he soon formed a gang.

== Prohibition ==
With Prohibition now in effect, Musey quickly gained a reputation for brutality which, along with bribery of local police, saw him dominate the local black market. Musey was arrested by federal agents in Louisiana during a liquor run. He, Nounes, and twenty-one others, would be tried and convicted on conspiracy liquor charges in 1929.

== Convict and fugitive ==
After his conviction, Musey fled to Montreal.

Now wanted by the United States Secret Service, an extensive search was carried out in Canada and Central America. Musey was eventually found two years later in Lake Charles. He was brought back to Galveston under heavy guard before being sent to Atlanta Penitentiary.

== Post-prohibition and assassination ==
After being released from prison, Musey opened a nightclub and began a profitable pinball machine operation.

Prior to his conviction, Musey and The Downtown Gang had developed a rivalry with other bootleggers, notably the Beach Gang and their successors, the Maceo Crime Syndicate. On the night of July 25, 1935, Musey was talking with a member of the Maceo Syndicate at The Alamo Club on 24th St., Galveston. Informed by a waiter that there was somebody outside who wished to see him, Musey made his way to the door, at which point he was shot five times with a .38 revolver by O.J. Windy Goss, a Maceo mob member. Musey was buried at Old Catholic Cemetery in Galveston, Texas survived by his wife Mary, and two children, Margaret and George Jr.

== See also ==
- Johnny Jack Nounes
- Downtown Gang
- Sam Maceo
- Free State of Galveston
- Ollie Quinn
- Dutch Voight
