= Johnny Jack Nounes =

Mob boss

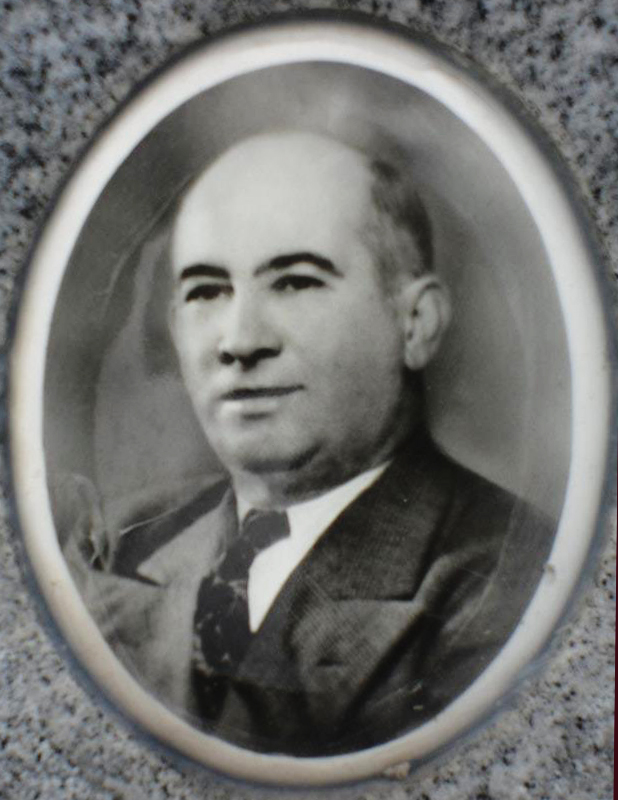
- Born: John Louis Nonus; January 12, 1890; Galveston, Texas, U.S.
- Died: March 11, 1970 (aged 80); Galveston, Texas, U.S.
- Other names: The Beau Brummel of Galveston; The Robin Hood of the Gulf; The King of the Underworld
- Occupations: Gangster, Mob Boss
- Title: Boss
- Spouses: Willie M. Nounes (c. 1920 – c. 1926); Ollie Nounes (c. 1926 – c. 1930); Mary L. Nounes (c. 1932 – c. 1935); Theresa M. Nounes (1942 – 1970; his death)
- Children: 3
- Parent(s): Emanuel Nonus and Angelica Pinto Nonus
- Status: Deceased
- Allegiance: Downtown Gang
- Convictions: 1924 and 1929
- Criminal charge: Bootlegging
- Penalty: Imprisonment, Leavenworth Penitentiary and Atlanta Penitentiary

Mayor of West Beach, Galveston, Texas
- In office 1947–1949

Mayor of Pirates Beach, Galveston, Texas
- In office 1960–?

Johnny Jack Nounes, also known as the "Beau Brummell of Galveston", was a mob boss in Galveston, Texas, United States, during the 1920s and 1930s. He, with one-armed George Musey, led the Downtown Gang, one of the two gangs which controlled most of the Galveston Crime Syndicate until the early 1930s. They fought for control of the island against the rival Beach Gang led by Ollie Quinn and Dutch Voight, and later their successors, the Maceo Crime Syndicate. As the prohibition era began, his gang came to be one of the dominant forces in the Galveston Crime Syndicate. Galveston became the main port of entry for liquor supply in Texas and many parts of the Midwest. Nounes' flamboyance attracted the attention of federal authorities, leading to his conviction in 1924 and sentencing to Leavenworth Penitentiary. His prison term was short but only two years after being released he was again sentenced to prison after being caught with a shipment of liquor in Seabrook. Frank Nitti, a business partner of Nounes, was the "enforcer" for Al Capone's crime organization in Chicago as well as the future boss of the Chicago Outfit.

== Family and early life ==
Johnny Jack Nounes was born John Louis Nonus in Galveston, Texas, to Emanuel and Angelica (Pinto) Nonus, both immigrants from Portugal. They both immigrated to New Orleans, Louisiana in 1872, and later married in Galveston soon after meeting. The Nonus family had fifteen children but six died at infancy; the remaining nine were Mary, Lyda, Annie, Mellie, Lily, Beatrice, Mabel, Johnny, and Francis. In 1900, the 1900 Galveston hurricane hit the island. During this devastating storm, Emanuel managed to break a hole in the house's ceiling in order to get all the children to safety; Johnny was ten years old.

One of Johnny's earliest jobs was a butcher. He would save all of the meat scraps and, at the end of the day, would give them to his younger brother Francis so that Francis could take them home to their struggling family. Around 1914 Johnny changed his last name from "Nonus" to "Nounes", maybe because he got involved with some type of criminal activity didn't want to ruin his family name as well as releasing it to rivals. So that how his name was born, Johnny Jack Nounes.

== Prohibition ==
As the prohibition of alcohol started to take way in the early 1920s, Nounes rounded up his gang, known as the Downtown Gang, with soldiers and went to work rum-running. During this time a young Syrian named George Musey stepped into the picture. He became Nounes' right-hand man, running the Downtown Gang with him. Among the earliest gang members were Theodore "Fatty" Owens, Otis Skains, Mitchell "Mitch" Frankovitch, Kye Gregory, Morris "Kid" Ross, Joe Varnell, Lawrence "King Coal" Balkey, and Tom Lera. The gang was stronger than ever with Nounes and Musey leading. Their midnight travels through rum-row made them more money than ever, which Nounes soon became a millionaire.

Johnny owned a boat called the Cherokee which had an airplane engine installed in it so it could out run any federal prohibition agent that tried to catch it. That boat was loaded with many cases of liquor from the Bahamas, Cuba, and Jamaica. Prostitution and gambling was now a side business operating in his clubs downtown. Among his first notable customer was Frank Nitti. Nitti, who was probably just a mob soldier then, would come down from the Chicago Outfit to meet with Johnny Jack in order to conduct business dealing with liquor. Southern gangsters attracted a lot of northern gangsters because of their direct access to the Gulf of Mexico. Frank Nitti later became a regular customer of Nounes but stole $50,000 from him in 1924 and not returning to Galveston until the close of prohibition. However despite their tension, Nitti did develop a liking to Johnny's brother Francis. Francis lost his job at the Santa Fe Railroad at the start of the Great Depression, and so Johnny gave him a job bar tending a speakeasy. Nitti took a liking to Francis and gave him Duncan Phyfe furniture along with other gifts.

Johnny Jack had the money coming in from the bootlegging, gambling, prostitution, and hijacking. He hijacked the Beach Gang's shipments and cheated the Cubans out of thinking soap coupons were money when buying booze. Notable gangsters of the time associated him with Chicago's Al Capone and allegedly New York's Arnold Rothstein. He was a flamboyant man who liked to be the center of attention. Being a generous man, would carry around a bundle of $100 bills and would give them to anybody in need. He would drive around and buy toys for the kids around town on Christmas. He made a lot of money, but also gave a lot away.

== "Beau Brummell of Galveston" ==
Nounes took a trip to New York City in the late 1920's and threw a $40,000 party at the Hotel Pennsylvania. Many high society officials and Hollywood actresses attended. Among some of them were Clara Bow and Nancy Carroll, who were both said to have bathed in tubs filled with champagne. Johnny also dated actress Theda Bara for a short time in the early 20s, who is also claimed to have had a champagne filled bath. He had his suits custom-tailored in New York while also having an apartment overlooking Central Park for when he went up to conduct business and throw one of his extravagant parties.

== Trials and Prison ==
Nounes was convicted in 1924 due to bootlegging. He received up to two years in Leavenworth Federal Penitentiary. When Judge J. C. Hutcheson fined him $5,000, Johnny grinned at him and said "Hell, Judge, I've got that much in my right pocket!" However that didn't help any, therefore, Nounes called Leavenworth his home for two years. However, after being released he met up with his right-hand man George Musey. They took the gang on a run and were unloading the booze at Seabrook, Texas, and were caught by agents. Nounes was then tried over the next two years and was sentenced to two years in Atlanta Federal Penitentiary in 1929. J.C. Hutcheson stated that Nounes has bothered him more than any other person in his district.

== Post-Prohibition and Later Life ==
After Nounes' release, and around the time prohibition was ending, the Chicago Outfit's Frank Nitti was seen back in Galveston. Conflicting accounts say he stole $50,000 from Johnny Jack and $24,000 from Johnny and opposing mobster Dutch Voight. However much it was, Nounes and Voight found Nitti at a Houston bar one night. They then high-tailed him back to the island where they talked over a nice plate of spaghetti on Seawall Boulevard. Johnny then confronted him that it would either be his money or his brains next to that plate of spaghetti. The next day Nitti forked over the money he owed and was riding a train back to Chicago never to be seen in Galveston again. Furthermore, Sam and Rose Maceo have taken over the Beach Gang and the Galveston crime underworld during Nounes' absence. They established the Maceo Syndicate and would come to take control of the island, especially after they pulled the hit on George Musey. Therefore, after the Downtown Gang's demise, Johnny would later go on to own businesses such as nightclubs, restaurants, and other establishments. He would then run for mayor of West Beach, Galveston and win the election in 1947, however he was found guilty of voter fraud and was forced out of office in 1949. However, he did enter politics again and ran for mayor in Pirates Beach, Galveston in 1960 and won again.

== Health Problems and Death ==
By the late 1960s Nounes had lost both of his legs due to diabetes, and later died on March 11, 1970, at St. Mary's Hospital, Galveston. One of his pallbearers at his honorary pallbearers was mobster Dutch Voight. He is buried at Calvary Catholic Cemetery.

== See also ==
- George Musey
- Dutch Voight
- Frank Nitti
- Downtown Gang
- Free State of Galveston
- Ollie Quinn
- Rosario Maceo
- Sam Maceo
- Al Capone
