= Open era (disambiguation) =

Open era or Open Era may refer to:

- Open Era, the period in tennis since 1968 where professionals can compete in Grand Slam tournaments
- Open era sometimes refers to Mikhail Gorbachev's period of glasnost and perestroika in the Soviet Union

Open era or wide-open era, may also refer to:

- Open range era of the American Old West when cattle were allowed to roam freely in many states
- Early 20th century in many U.S. communities when gambling, prostitution, and/or other vices were tolerated by local governments. Among these communities were:
  - Galveston, Texas
  - Hot Springs, Arkansas
  - Atlantic City, New Jersey
