= Musey =

Musey may be,

- Musey language
- Poney Musey, a breed of horse
- George Musey
