= Sam Maceo =

Businessman, power broker and crime boss

- Born: Salvatore Maceo; March 1, 1894; Palermo, Sicily, Italy
- Died: April 16, 1951 (aged 57); Baltimore, Maryland, US
- Resting place: Galveston Memorial Park, Galveston, Texas, U.S.
- Other names: "Velvet Glove"
- Occupations: Barber, businessman, Political power broker, supper club manager, bootlegger
- Years active: 1920?–1950
- Known for: Organized crime; established Galveston as a gaming and entertainment center
- Predecessor: Ollie Quinn
- Successor: Victor J. Fertitta and Anthony Fertitta
- Opponents: Texas Rangers; Downtown Gang (Johnny Jack Nounes); smaller gangs in Texas
- Relatives: Rosario Maceo (brother)

Salvatore V. "Sam" Maceo (Italian pronunciation: [salvaˈtoːre maˈtʃɛːo]; March 1, 1894 – April 16, 1951) was an American business entrepreneur, power broker and racketeer in Galveston, Texas, who controlled both the government and organized crime in the city for almost 30 years. During the 1920s and 1930s, Galveston emerged as a nationally known resort city, because of the gambling, prostitution and free flowing liquor, vices that were offered at the backrooms of restaurants and nightclubs, a period known as Galveston's Open Era. His organization, often called the Maceo Syndicate or the Maceo Organisation, was involved in illegal gambling, prostitution, the numbers racket and bootlegging, and he received substantial income from these activities.

At the height of his power, he was able to control both the government and organized crime in the city. Sometimes known as the "Velvet Glove," Sam held considerable criminal and political influence in Southeast Texas and soon expanded his empire throughout the state. During his lifetime he and his island home were known nationwide.

== Early life ==
Salvatore V. Maceo was born in Palermo, Sicily to Vito Maceo and Angelina Sansone in 1894. He had three brothers, Rosario (Rose), Vincent, and Frank. In 1901 the Maceo family immigrated to Leesville, Louisiana in the United States. He moved to Galveston in 1910, shortly before World War I, to start a business with his brother Rose.

== Rise to power ==
As Prohibition took hold Sam and Rose began to give gifts of wine that they were able to smuggle to their customers. As their customers became more interested in the liquor they gradually became more serious bootleggers. Maceo allied himself with local gang leader and power broker Ollie Quinn and opened a speakeasy. Eventually Quinn became Sam's mentor and associate. He and the brothers opened the Hollywood Dinner Club, the Gulf coast's most elegant night club at the time. Sam's smooth personality quickly made him the "face" of the nightclub.

The arrest of Quinn allowed Sam and his brother, Rosario, to gain control of Galveston. Their other big venture, besides the Hollywood, was a club and casino called Maceo's Grotto which opened in 1929. The Maceos soon controlled most of the gambling, prostitution, and other vice on the city. Their wealth and Sam's ability to deal with influential figures allowed him to exert increasing influence over politics.

Maceo cultivated relationships with businessmen and politicians throughout Galveston including William L. Moody, head of one of Galveston's most prominent families. Over the years Sam was able to secure substantial financing from Moody's American National Insurance Company (ANICO) and many other institutions. Maceo came to be an extremely powerful figure in both organised crime and city, county and state politics, with the support and blessing of prominent figures throughout the United States.

== Galveston's open era ==
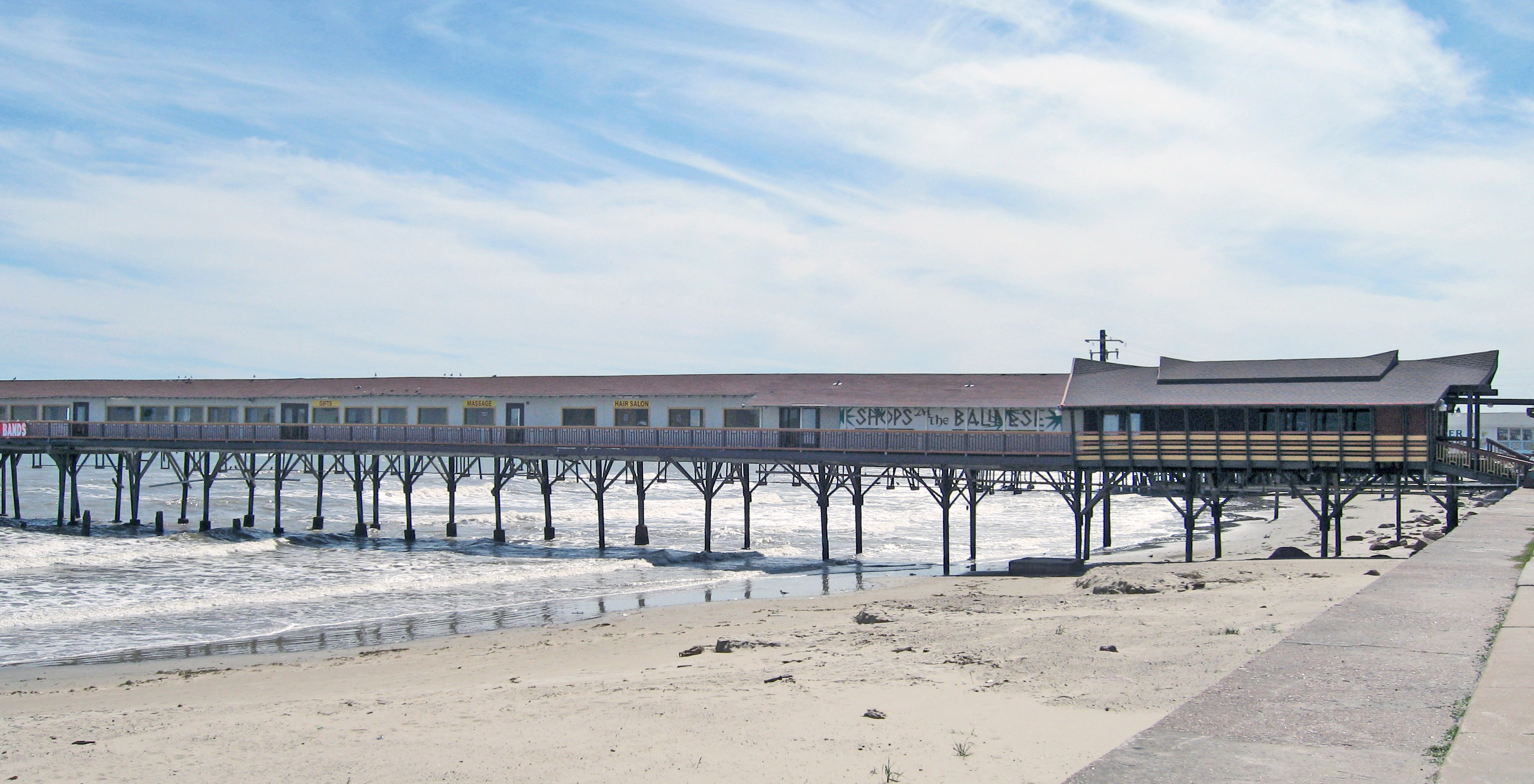
The Balinese Room, one of the organisation's two main clubs

Maceo's power reached its zenith during Galveston's open era during which he became a very powerful political figure and oil businessman, owning the Gulf Oil Properties. His approach in running of his empire has given him the nickname "the Velvet Hammer".

During this time period, the criminal aspect of his empire was said to include dozens of casinos, bookmaking parlors and speakeasies throughout the city and Galveston County, particularly Kemah and Dickinson. Additionally, during this time period, Maceo came to dominate corrupt politics, bootlegging and narcotics trafficking as far north as Dallas.

Galveston soon became a center of a center of culture and economy and one of the nation's premier locations for holding conventions, in large part due to the availability of gambling and alcohol.

Though the criminal operations the Maceos owned were largely confined to Galveston County and the southeast part of Texas, there were criminal connections throughout the state and North America. Well-known mobsters, such as Albert Anastasia, Frank Nitti and Al Capone were gambling and bootlegging partners to the Maceos. However, the Maceos never allowed other mobsters to directly enter the Galveston underworld. Once, Capone sent Nitti, a former associate of Sam, to invest in Galveston operations. Nitti was chased by one of Maceo's men and made to leave Galveston, before handling in a large amount of cash he had stolen from Johnny Jack Nounes, a powerful local mobster and former rival of Ollie Quinn.

== Narcotics charges and downfall ==
In 1937 federal charges were filed against Sam Maceo who was accused of being the mastermind of a nationwide narcotics trafficking scheme. Maceo was released on bail and fought extradition to New York. Ultimately he was acquitted in 1942. There was a great deal of speculation in Galveston as to whether Maceo was framed including speculation that the Moody family was involved.

By the late 1940s corruption at the Texas state and county level was in decline. As investigation of the Maceo activities became more serious, the Maceos began plans to move their empire to Nevada. Sam Maceo became a major investor in the Desert Inn, which opened in 1950, the largest and most elaborate casino resort on the Las Vegas Strip at the time. Moe Dalitz, who opened the Desert Inn, and Sam and had long been allies and business partners, and financing of the Las Vegas project was largely facilitated by the Maceos and Moodys through the ANICO (the company, for its part, is known to have lent millions to known mob figures). Sam and Rose Maceo transferred controlling interest of most of their Galveston empire to a new group dominated by the Fertitta family with investments coming from business interests around the island. The Fertitta group, however, never wielded the influence that the Maceos had and they eventually lost control as well.

== Death and legacy ==
Sam Maceo died of cancer in 1951 at Johns Hopkins Hospital, just after the opening of the Desert Inn. His death made national obituary news. Galveston's wide-open era ended a few years after Maceo's death when authorities raided the island's gambling establishments. The Balinese Room continued to operate as a restaurant until 2008, when it was completely destroyed by Hurricane Ike.

== Personal life ==
Maceo first married Jessica McBride in Galveston. He later remarried to Edna Marie Sedgwick, a ballet dancer from Rhode Island in 1941. Sedgwick had begun her career in ballet at a young age, had performed for heads of state throughout Europe and had performed in Universal Studios films such as "You're a Sweetheart" (1937). While traveling with a group of entertainers to Galveston, Edna met Sam and they were soon married. Sam and Edna had three children, Sam Jr., Edward, and Sedgie. Following Sam's death, Edna married Henry George Plitt of New York, founder of Plitt Theaters.

In spite of Sam's influence in the community and importance to the economy, the Maceos were never accepted by the leading families of Galveston society. Indeed, Sam was never allowed to join the local country club, a mark of acceptance among leading families. Reports indicate that Edna in particular felt the rejection by high society.

== Public perceptions ==
In the business world, Sam Maceo was known as being pleasant and persuasive. He was influential with politicians, business leaders, and Hollywood celebrities alike.

The general public saw Maceo as a kind, generous person who genuinely cared for the Galveston community. Sam was known for favoring local companies when hiring contractors for the syndicate. He donated heavily to the church and to local charities. According to one story, a local automobile dealer, on the edge of bankruptcy, fortuitously managed to sell a fleet of cars to all of the priests in the city, paid for by Sam Maceo. Another account says that when Maceo discovered that a local black church could not afford a new roof, a work crew soon appeared free of charge to do the work. After a giant port explosion devastated neighboring Texas City in 1947, Maceo organized a fundraiser featuring celebrities like Frank Sinatra and Jack Benny.

== See also ==
- Free State of Galveston
- Dutch Voight
- Sicilian American
- Tilman J. Fertitta
- Texas City Disaster
