= Rosario Maceo =

American mobster

- Born: Rosario Maceo; June 8, 1887; Palermo, Sicily, Italy
- Died: March 29, 1954 (aged 66); Galveston, Texas, U.S.
- Resting place: Galveston Memorial Park, Galveston, Texas, U.S.
- Other names: "Iron Glove"
- Citizenship: American
- Occupations: Club manager, bootlegger
- Years active: 1920?–1952
- Known for: Establishing Galveston as a gambling and entertainment center
- Predecessor: Ollie Quinn
- Successor: Victor J. Fertitta and Anthony Fertitta
- Opponents: Texas Rangers; Downtown Gang (Johnny Jack Nounes); Frank Nitti; smaller gangs
- Spouse: Frances Maceo
- Children: 1
- Relatives: Sam Maceo (brother)

Rosario Maceo (Sr.) (Italian pronunciation: [roˈzaːrjo maˈtʃɛːo] June 8, 1887 – March 29, 1954), also known as Papa Rose or Rose Maceo, was an Italian-American businessman, power broker and crime boss in Galveston, Texas in the United States. Because of his efforts and those of his brother Sam, Galveston Island became a nationally known resort city during the early and mid 20th century, during a period known as Galveston's Wide-Open Era. They owned various restaurant and casino venues including the now-vanished Hollywood Dinner Club and the Balinese Room. He became an Al Capone-like figure in the city. Sometimes known as the "Iron Glove", Rose was the top enforcer for the empire he and his brother formed.

== Early life ==
Rosario Maceo was born in Palermo, Sicily in 1887. He had three brothers, Salvatore (Sam), Vincent, and Frank. The Maceo family immigrated to Louisiana in the United States in 1901. He trained as a barber and later moved to Galveston in 1910, shortly before World War I, to start a business eventually with his brother Sam.

== Growth of an empire ==
As Prohibition took hold, the Maceo brothers began to give gifts of wine (low-quality to be sure) that they were able to smuggle to their customers. As their customers became more interested in the liquor they gradually became more serious bootleggers. Rose Maceo had part of his business on Murdoch's Pier, a hangout for Ollie Quinn, leader of the Beach Gang which was one of two main gangs on the island. Rose built a relationship with Quinn and the Maceo brothers gradually allied themselves with the Beach Gang. They opened a "cold drink place," (i.e. speakeasy) and invested in the gang's gambling operations. Eventually the Beach Gang leader Ollie Quinn and the Maceos opened the Hollywood Dinner Club, the Gulf Coast's most elegant night club at the time. Rose's ability to intimidate made him an enforcer in the organization early on. Fortuitous arrests of the leaders of the gangs allowed the Maceo brothers to gain control of the island's underworld.

The Maceos gradually invested in numerous clubs and other entertainment ventures in the city involving gambling and bootlegging. Their other big venture, besides the Hollywood, was a club and casino called Maceo's Grotto (later renamed the Balinese Room) which opened in 1929. The Maceos soon controlled most of the gambling, prostitution, and other vice on the island. Rose acted as the "inside man" in the organization enforcing control over the organization and the island while his brother Sam was the "face" of the organization establishing partnerships, negotiating deals, and attracting tourism and investment.

The Maceos became wealthy as their businesses expanded and the island prospered. Their syndicate owned dozens of casinos and restaurants both on the island and throughout Galveston County. To compensate for the often inept and corrupt police force and judicial system on the island, Rose led a group of vigilantes known as the "Night Riders" to keep order on the island. Area residents considered the island and their homes entirely safe in spite of rampant criminal activity.

== Personal life ==
Rose Maceo married Frances Dispensa. Frances was described as being exceedingly kind but, like her husband, very strong.

The Fertitta family and the Maceo family considered each other kin because of the marriage of Joseph Frances Fertitta to Rose's sister Olivia Maceo. The Fertittas became involved in the Maceo businesses due to this relationship.

Rose helped raise Frances's nephew, Angelo who lived down the street from them on Avenue O. Angelo was related to the Fertittas.

== End of an era ==
The heyday of the Free State was over by the 1940s. Because of conflicts with the United States Treasury, the Hollywood Dinner Club was shut down in the late 1930s. The local clubs found it increasingly difficult to attract major entertainment figures. Gambling had been legalized in Nevada in 1931 and this distinct advantage over Galveston gradually lured mob figures such as New York City's Bugsy Siegel to Las Vegas. The competition created by the up-and-coming entertainment center in the desert substantially challenged the island on the Gulf. Still even during the later years the Balinese Room was able to attract the likes of Tony Bennett and Peggy Lee, among others.

By the late 1940s corruption at the Texas state and county level was in decline. As investigation of the Maceo activities became more serious, Sam and Rose began plans to move their empire to Nevada. Thanks to Sam's dealings the Maceos became major investors in the Desert Inn, which opened in 1950, the largest and most elaborate casino resort on the Las Vegas Strip at the time. Sam and Rose Maceo transferred controlling interest of most of their Galveston empire to a new group dominated by the Fertitta family with investments coming from business interests around the island. The Fertitta group, however, never wielded the influence that the Maceos had.

Rose Maceo died in 1954 from heart disease. His death made national obituary news.

== See also ==
- Free State of Galveston
- Sicilian American
- Tilman J. Fertitta
