= Balinese Room =

Former nightclub in Galveston, Texas, US

- Formerly listed on the U.S. National Register of Historic Places
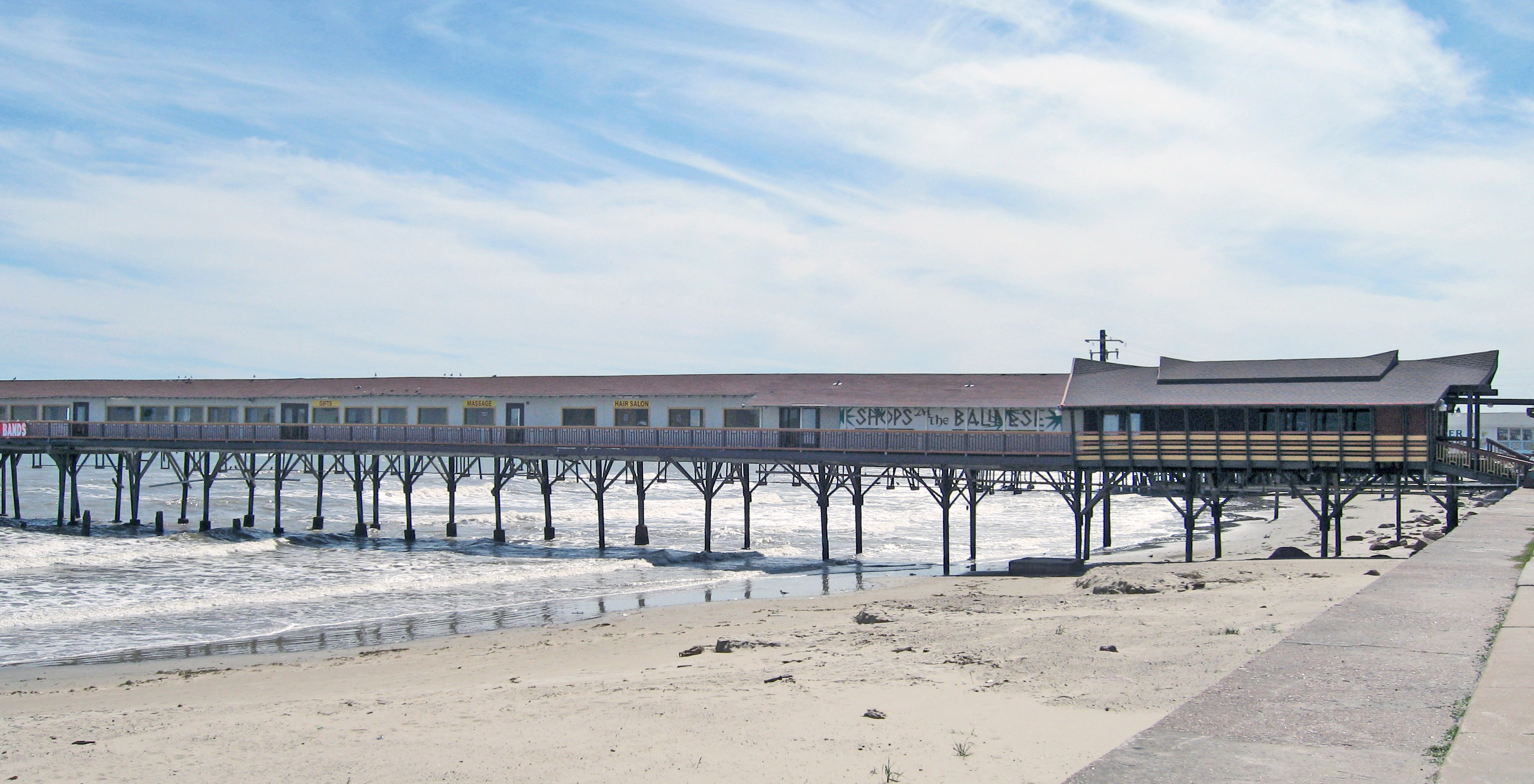
- Balinese Room in 2006 before its destruction by Hurricane Ike

- Location within Texas Location within the United States
- Location: 2107 Seawall Blvd., Galveston, Texas
- Coordinates: 29°17′24″N 94°47′08″W
- Area: less than one acre
- Built: 1942
- Architect: Raymond R. Rapp
- Demolished: September 13, 2008
- NRHP reference No.: 97000258

Significant dates
- Added to NRHP: April 2, 1997
- Removed from NRHP: January 8, 2009

The Balinese Room was a famous nightclub in Galveston, Texas, United States built on a pier stretching 600 feet (183 m) from the Galveston Seawall over the waters of the Gulf of Mexico. For decades a dance hall and illegal casino, the Balinese Room was remodeled and reopened in 2001 without a casino. During the early morning hours of September 13, 2008, the structure was destroyed by Hurricane Ike.

Operated by Sicilian barbers-turned-bootleggers Sam and Rosario Maceo, the Balinese Room (also known as Maceo's Grotto) was an elite spot in the 1930s and 1940s (Galveston's open era), featuring entertainment by Frank Sinatra, Bob Hope, George Burns, the Marx Brothers and other top acts of the day. Patrons of the private club included Howard Hughes, Sophie Tucker and wealthy oil barons from nearby Houston.

In 1997, it was listed on the National Register of Historic Places. The Balinese is featured in pop culture; Rock group ZZ Top wrote and performed a song about the club called, "Balinese".

== History ==
The Maceos took over "Chop Suey", a small restaurant at the intersection of 21st Street and Seawall Boulevard, and in 1929 they opened "Maceo's Grotto" at that location. It was one of many entertainment venues that popped up along the Galveston Seawall around that time (along with bathhouses and dance clubs, some of which were illegal casinos). In 1932, the "Grotto" was remodeled into a Chinese restaurant called "Sui Jen" (pronounced Swee Rin), and a 200-foot pier stretching out over the Gulf was added to the building. The pier location, across 21st Street from the Galvez, made the restaurant/club an easy walk for those Galveston visitors who preferred to stay in one of the city's most exclusive hotels.

The Oriental-sounding name was changed to the more exotic sounding Balinese Room in 1942, after the Japanese attack on Pearl Harbor on December 7, 1941, and the decor was modified accordingly. The pier was also expanded to 600 feet. The Balinese Room's private back room was equipped with the most modern gaming (gambling) equipment, and the Maceos' advertisements invited high rollers to "Come Down and Play on Galveston Island."

During this period it also became Balinese Room lore that head bartender Santos Cruz "invented" the Margarita for singer Peggy Lee in 1948. He supposedly named it after the Spanish version of her name, Margarita, and it's been a hit ever since. However, there is an account from 1936 of Iowa newspaper editor James Graham finding such a cocktail in Tijuana, years before any of the other margarita "creation myths".

The club's illegal gambling made it a hub of mob activity. It was well known that the casino, at the far end of the pier, was operating in violation of the law. But the Maceos had many allies in the local government and on the police force, so charges were never filed. The sheriff of Galveston County at the time, when called before the Texas Legislature to testify about why the club remained open, replied that he wasn't a member of the private club so he couldn't get in.

In 1956, Will Wilson was elected as Texas Attorney General after campaigning to "close down Galveston" and its illegal casinos using the Texas Rangers. The Rangers set up shop in a hotel near the club, and raided the casino often. But their efforts were thwarted by the length of the pier, known as the "Rangers Run". By the time they ran down to the tail end of the long, narrow club, tables, cards and chips had disappeared into secret wall and floor pockets. The band often would strike up the song "The Eyes of Texas" upon their arrival.

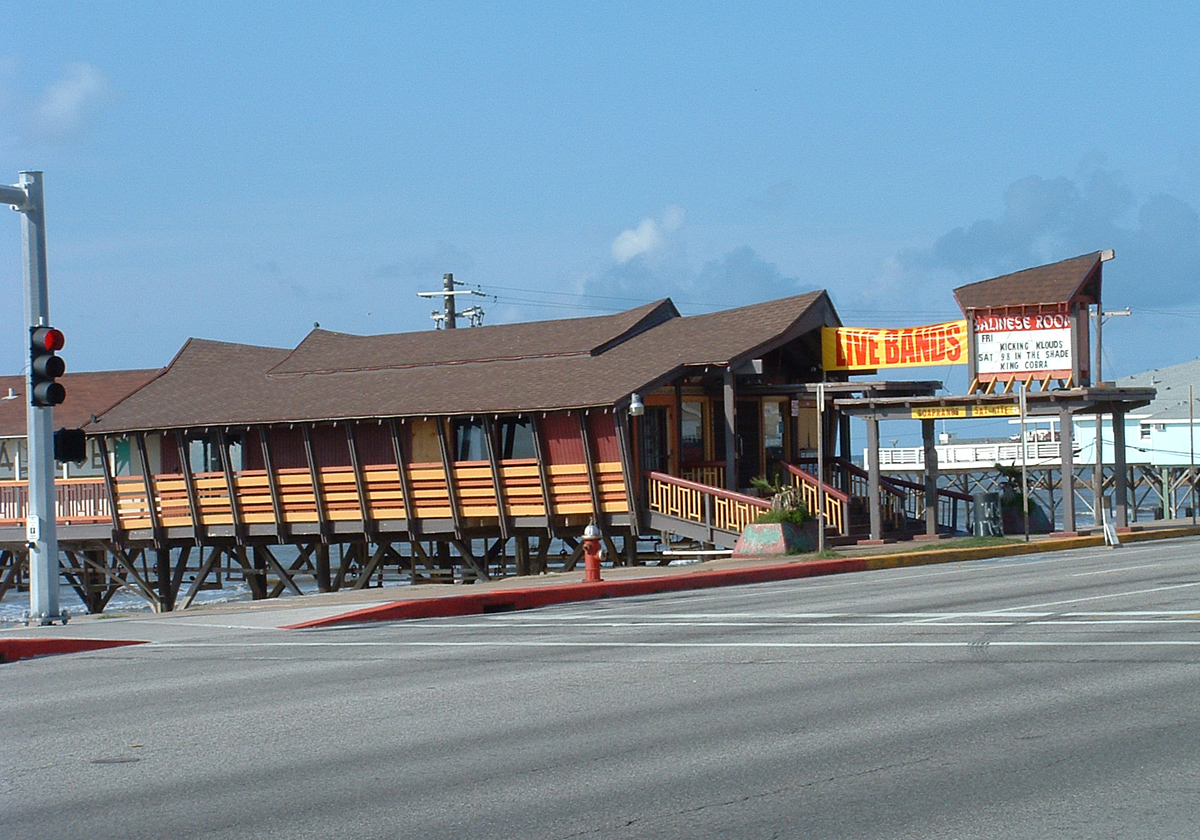
The Balinese Room as it existed after reopening in 2001

Later on, the Rangers attempted to disrupt the business through nonstop surveillance – they simply sat in the casino all day, every day. Customers, intimidated by the Rangers' presence, were less frequent and business suffered. The club nevertheless stayed open. The Rangers finally launched an undercover operation. Ranger Clint Peoples managed to pose as a customer and was admitted to the club and witnessed the gambling. His work coordinated with a raid enabled the gambling equipment in the club to be seized. The club finally closed its doors on May 30, 1957.

In 1961, Hurricane Carla damaged the structure. Many of the piers that supported the structure had been washed away, and over following years, the building continued to decay.

In the 1970s the Balinese Room was purchased and reopened by oil tycoon Johnny Mitchell, who turned the casino into a dinner club and disco. Many celebrities appeared at the club during these years. After Mitchell died in 1996, the Balinese Room and its pier eventually became the property of the State of Texas. A local attorney, Scott Arnold, took out a 60-year lease on the pier, and in 2001, reopened the Balinese Room for business. In addition to the Balinese Room itself, which was used for live music, parties, and weekend public dining, the pier had a salon, retail shops and a massage therapy room with a glass floor.

Much of the original Balinese structure and decor had been either modified or destroyed over the years, but the South Seas interior decor of the large ballroom survived and was restored to match its 1940s appearance. The hallway of the long pier was lined with autographed photos of past performers and other memorabilia.

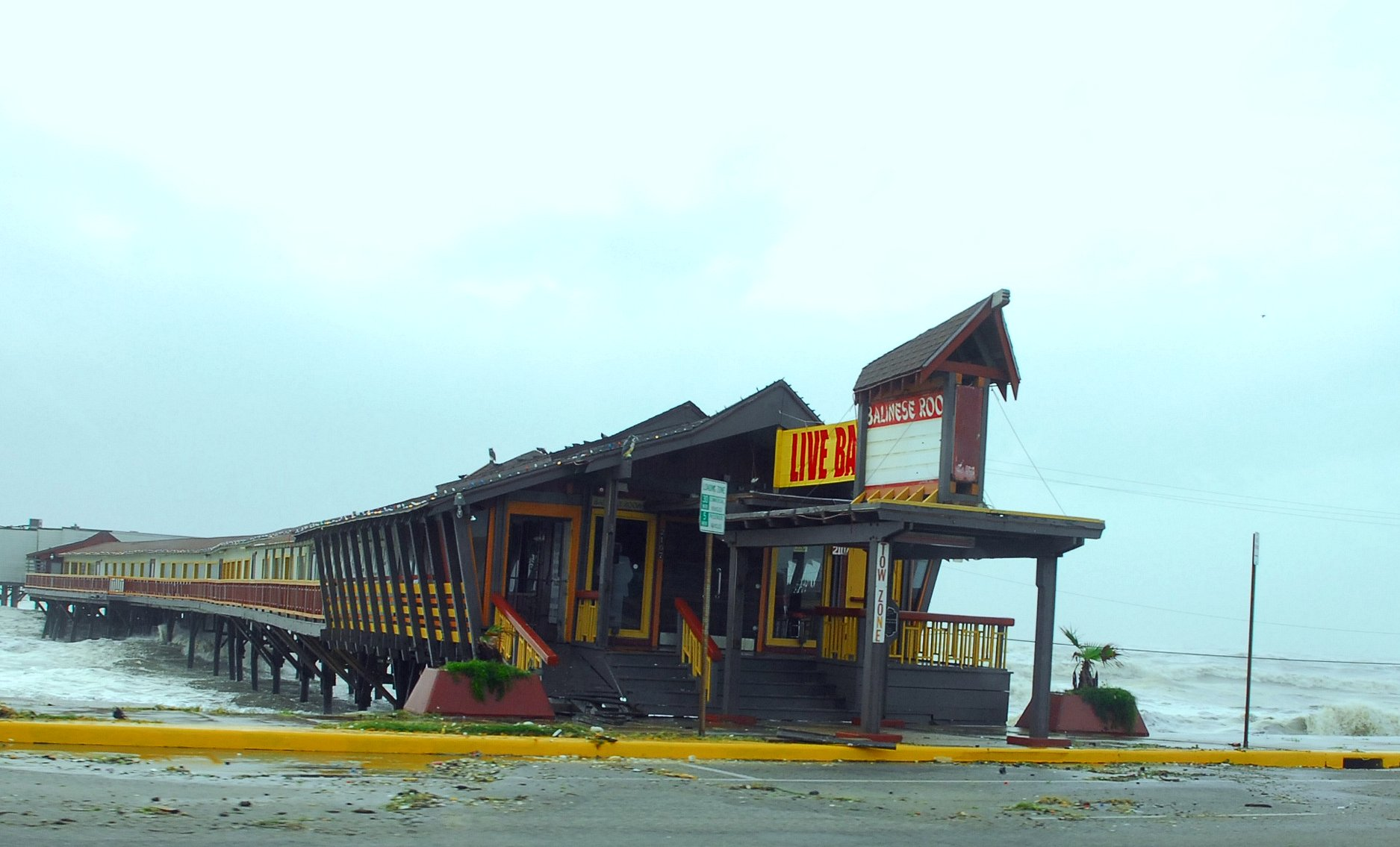
Balinese Room on September 12, 2008, shortly before its destruction

=== Destruction ===
As Hurricane Ike approached Galveston on Friday, September 12, 2008, the storm surge raised the water level to a point where waves were occasionally topping the Galveston Seawall, sending water and debris onto Seawall Boulevard.

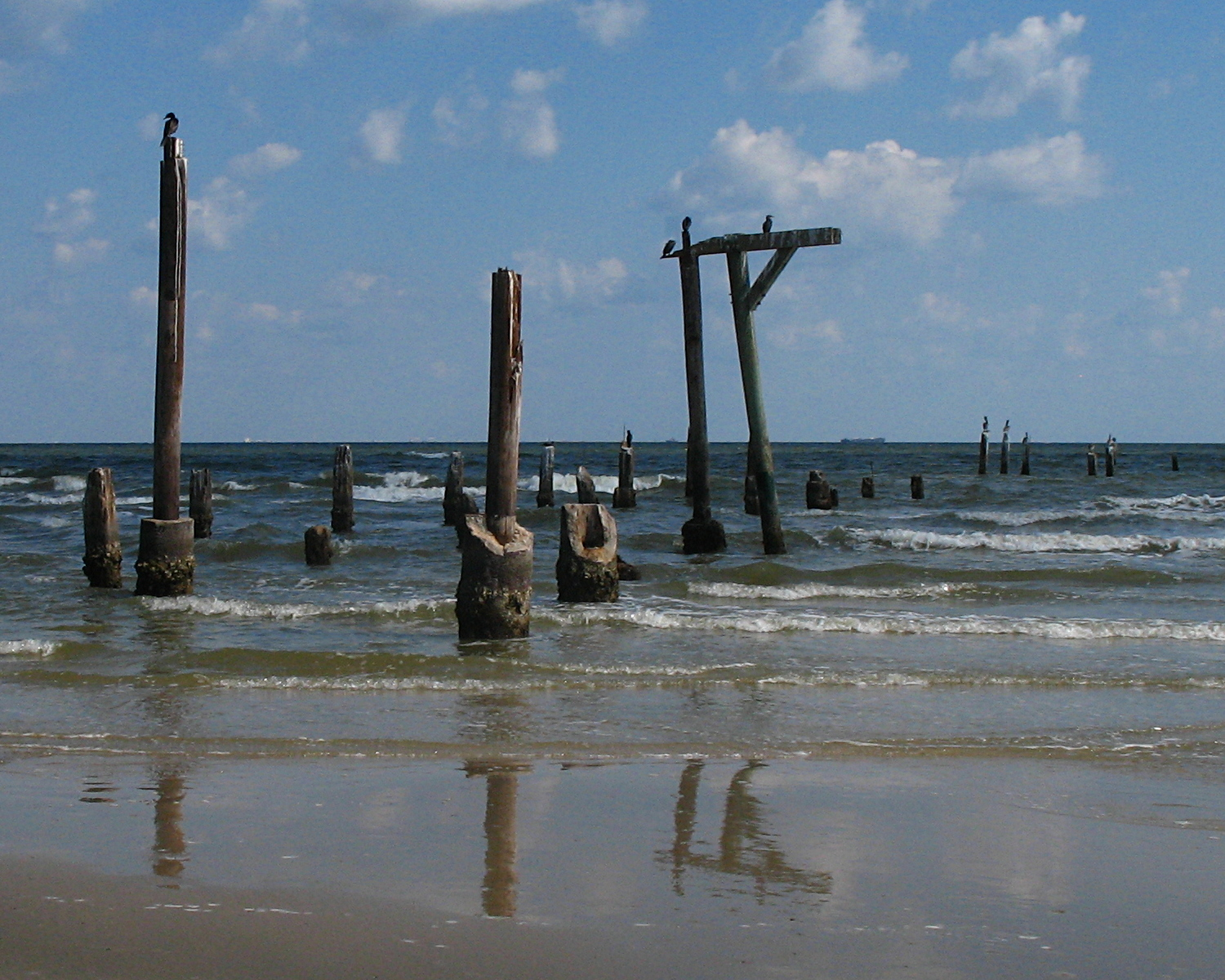
Site of the Balinese Room in October 2008

Later that night and early Saturday morning, Hurricane Ike barreled ashore, with the eye of the storm tracking into Galveston Bay. Although the pier was higher than the seawall, Ike's storm surge, waves, and wind were more than the 79-year-old structure could handle. After having survived hurricanes Carla, Alicia, and numerous smaller storms, the famous old club was destroyed. Only plywood, rubble, metal and the famed red door were left after the hurricane passed through.

=== In popular culture ===
The Balinese Room is celebrated in a 1975 song by the band ZZ Top.

The 1989 film Night Game featured the Balinese Room as a filming location.

The 1993 film Dazed and Confused played an excerpt of the aforementioned ZZ Top song "Balinese".

== See also ==
- Houston Crime Family
- Free State of Galveston
