= Free State of Galveston =

Era in Galveston, Texas history

Coordinates: 29°16′52″N 94°49′33″W

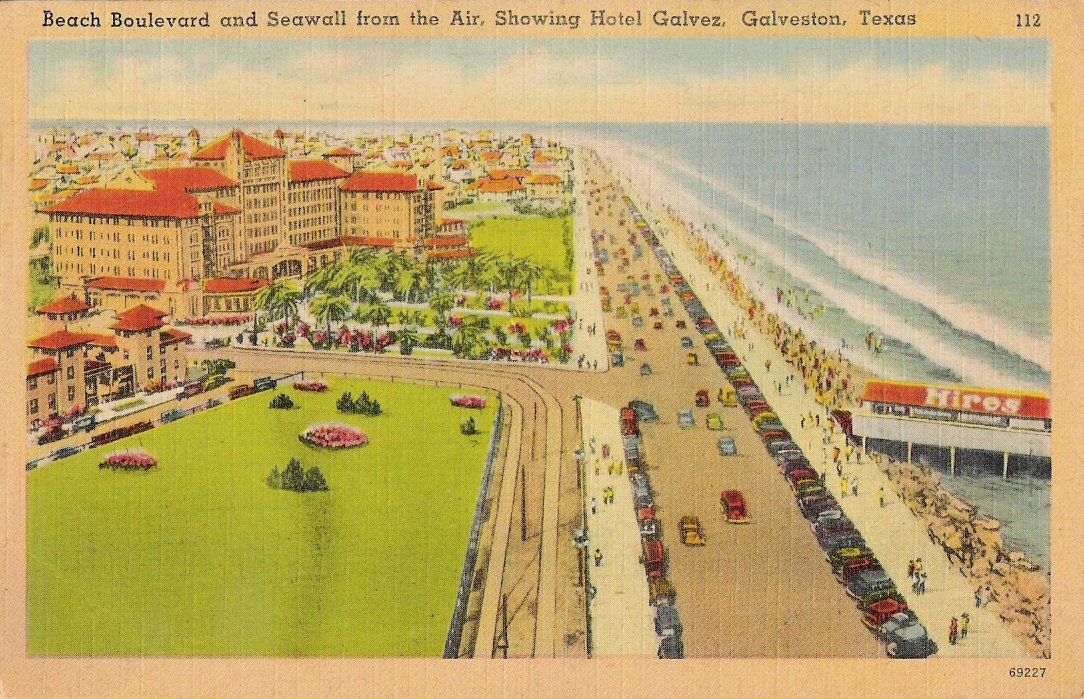
- Postcard view of Beach Boulevard and the Hotel Galvez, early 1940s
- Date: 1920–1957
- Location: Galveston, Texas, United States
- Also known as: Republic of Galveston Island / Open Era of Galveston

The Free State of Galveston (sometimes referred to as the Republic of Galveston Island) was a satirical name given to the coastal city of Galveston in the U.S. state of Texas during the early-to-mid-20th century. Today, the term is sometimes used to describe the culture and history of that era.

During the Roaring Twenties, Galveston Island emerged as a popular resort town, attracting celebrities from around the country. Gambling, illegal liquor, and other vice-oriented businesses were a major part of tourism. The "Free State" moniker embodied a belief held by many locals that Galveston was beyond what they perceived were repressive mores and laws of Texas and the United States. Two major figures of the era were the businessmen, power brokers and crime bosses Sam and Rosario Maceo, who ran the chief casinos and clubs on the island and were heavily involved in local politics and the tourism industry. The success of vice on the island, despite being illegal, was enabled by lax attitudes in society and in government, both on the island and in the county. In one of the more famous examples of this, a state committee, investigating gambling at the fabled Balinese Room, was told by the local sheriff that he had not raided the establishment because it was a "private club" and because he was not a "member".

Much of this period represented a high point in Galveston's economy. It is sometimes referred to as the "open era" or the "wide-open era" because the business owners and the community made little effort to hide the illegal activities. The tourist industry spawned by the illegal businesses helped to offset Galveston's decline as a commercial and shipping center following a devastating hurricane in 1900, but crackdowns against gambling and prostitution in Texas during the mid-20th century made these businesses increasingly difficult to sustain. By the end of the 1950s, this era of Galveston's history had ended. As a result, its economy became stagnant for many years afterward.

== Background ==
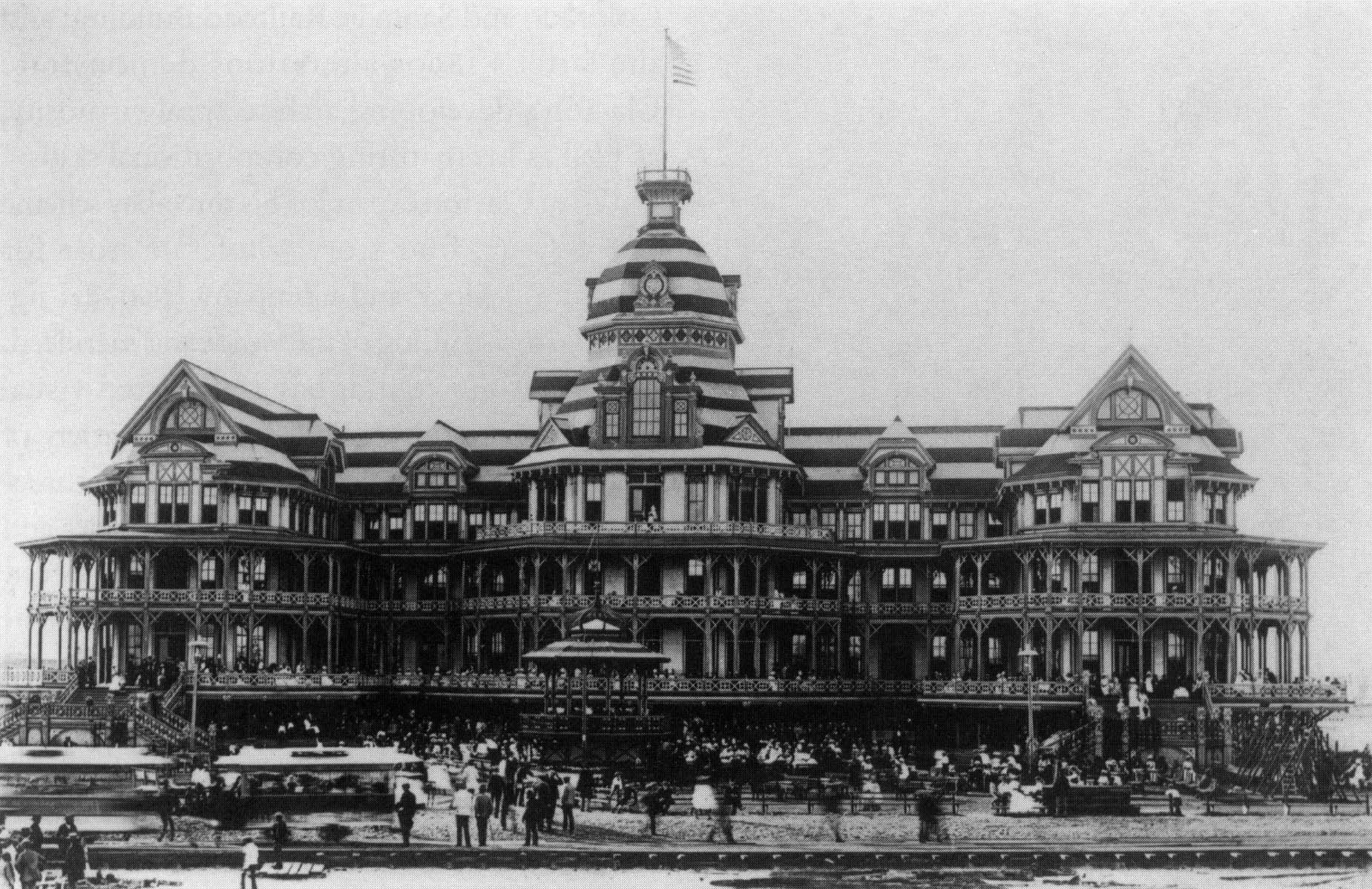
The Beach Hotel, a popular 19th-century Galveston resort

The island of Galveston, which lies on the Gulf of Mexico, held one of the first major settlements in the eastern part of what is now Texas. During the mid- to late 19th century, it became the largest city in the state. Galveston was also an important national commercial center and one of the busiest seaports in the United States, as the Port of Galveston was able to capitalize on Texas' rapid rise in the cotton trade. Its downtown was known as the "Wall Street of the Southwest", and by 1900, the city had one of the highest per capita incomes in the U.S. Though nearby Houston was emerging as an important city in its own right, Galveston was the state's cultural and economic center at the time. Vices such as prostitution and gambling, which were common throughout Texas during the 19th century, continued to be tolerated to various degrees on the island in the early 20th century.

The 1900 Galveston hurricane was an unparalleled disaster. Estimates of the death toll range from 6,000 to 12,000 people, in addition to many more on the Gulf Coast and along the shores of the bay. Immediately after the hurricane, Galveston worked to revive itself as a port and an entertainment center, including the construction of tourist destinations such as the Hotel Galvez, which opened in 1911. In the same year, the Galveston–Houston Electric Railway opened and became recognized as the fastest interurban rail system in the country. Galveston's port was also rebuilt quickly, and by 1912, had become the second-leading exporter in the nation, behind New York. Nevertheless, after the 1900 storm and another in 1915, many avoided investing in the island.

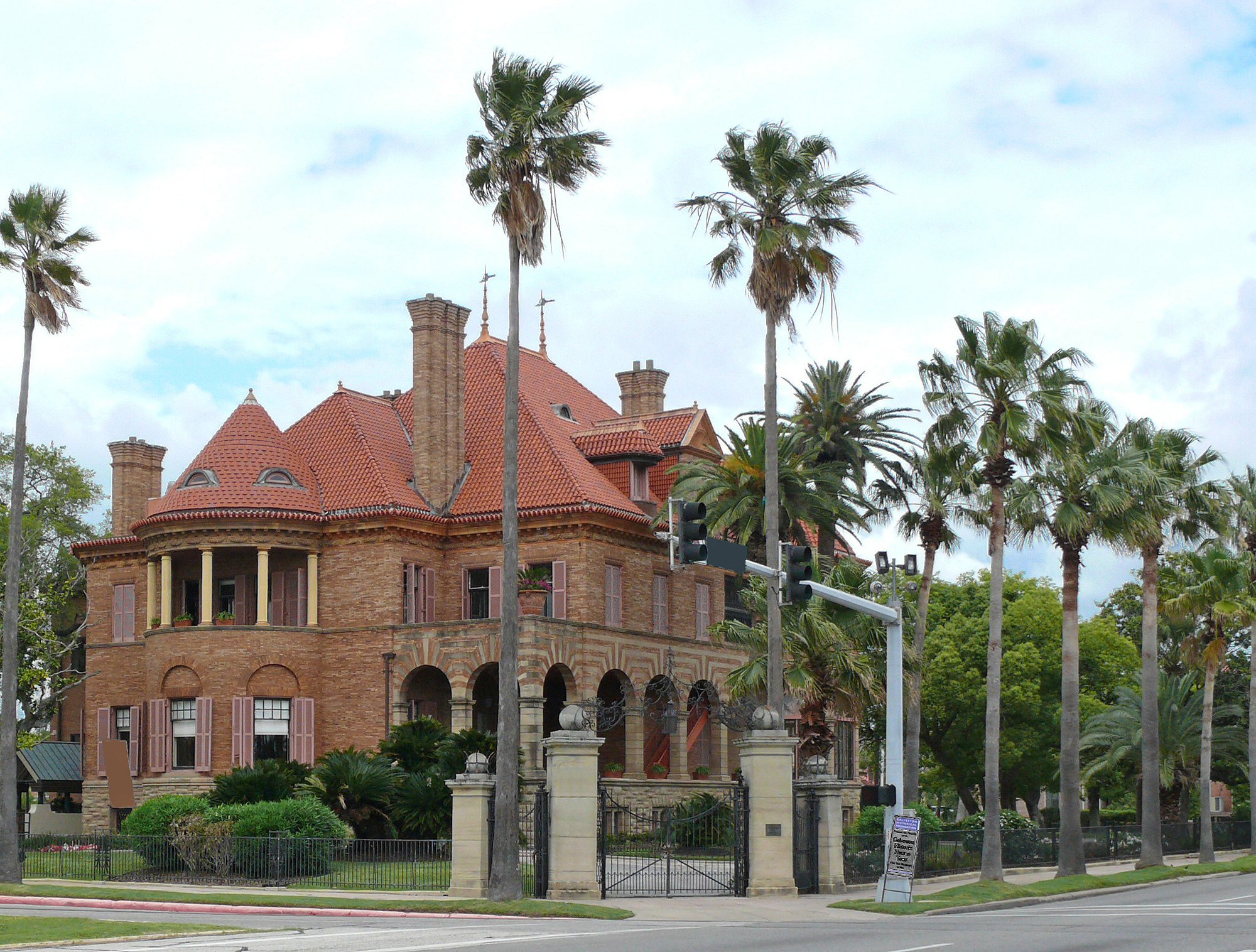
Open Gates mansion, built by George Sealy, 1891

Galveston had been a major port of entry for Texas and the West during the 19th century, and a new wave of immigration came through the port in the early 20th century. For a time, it was known as "Little Ellis Island". In contrast to the heavily German immigration of the 19th century, the new arrivals in Galveston were Greeks, Italians, Russian Jews (part of the Galveston Movement), and others who came to settle in many parts of the country, including some who remained on the island itself. Of particular note are the Sicilian immigrants who formed a significant community in Galveston County, as well as the nearby city of Brazoria.

The opening of the Houston Ship Channel in 1915 further challenged the port city. Houston and Texas City, as well as other ports, rapidly overtook Galveston as leading ports and commercial centers; by 1930, map makers were showing Houston as the major city on the Texas coast, instead of Galveston. Cotton shipping, which Galveston had thoroughly dominated on a worldwide level, began migrating to other ports in Texas and on the West Coast.

As Galveston's traditional economy declined, Texas' oil boom began in 1901, with oil wells and refineries constructed throughout the state. Galveston's direct role in this boom was minimal, as investors avoided building pipelines and refineries on the island itself (though for a time oil was shipped through the island). Nevertheless, wealth brought on by the boom transformed nearby Houston, Texas City, Goose Creek (modern Baytown), and other communities. Houston in particular became home to a large community of wealthy businessmen and investors. Galveston became even more tourism-focused as the city sought to attract these nearby nouveaux riches. Though, the city had some success in re-establishing tourism and shipping, its economy struggled to rise to the level it had been before the 1900 storm.

== Prohibition and the Maceos ==
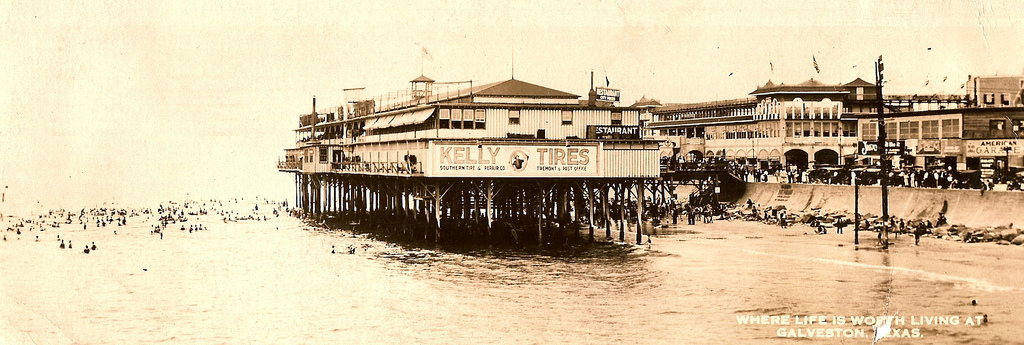
Murdoch's Bathhouse, once a popular Galveston attraction (c. 1919)

During the early 20th century, reform movements in the U.S. (the so-called Progressive movement) made most forms of gambling illegal in most communities. Gambling continued illegally in many places, though, creating new opportunities for criminal enterprises. The 18th Amendment to the U.S. Constitution, ratified in 1919, outlawed the manufacture, transportation, importation, and sale of alcoholic beverages and initiated the Prohibition era. The new law was widely unpopular, and rum-running and bootlegging became rampant. Galveston's already lax social attitudes allowed this, as well as brothels and other illegal businesses, to blossom in the city. These institutions were so accepted that at one point, the city required health inspections for prostitutes to ensure the safety of their clients.

At the beginning of Prohibition, two main gangs divided the city: the Beach Gang led by Ollie Quinn, and the Downtown Gang led by Johnny Jack Nounes. Though the gangs largely kept to themselves, shootouts and gang-related killings were not unheard of. Rum-running became big business; liquor was imported from overseas and distributed throughout the city, the state, and other parts of the country. A "rum row" (a line of booze-laden ships from Cuba, Jamaica, and the Bahamas) became a fixture about 35 miles (56 km) beyond the coastline, where smaller boats fetched the goods and brought them to shore. Quinn was the leading figure in Galveston's vice market. Quinn's partner Dutch Voight is often referred to as the "father" of organized gambling on the island because he established organized poker games in 1910. Quinn's main casino, the Deluxe Club, was an island landmark.

About this time, the Maceo family became important to Galveston's history. The family had immigrated from Palermo, Sicily, to Louisiana in 1901. Two brothers, Rosario (Rose) and Salvatore (Sam) Maceo, trained as barbers and moved to Galveston shortly before World War I to start their business. As Prohibition took hold, the brothers began to give their customers gifts of (low-quality) wine that they were able to smuggle. As their customers became more interested in the liquor, the Maceos gradually became more serious bootleggers. They allied themselves with the Beach Gang, opened a "cold drink place" (i.e., speakeasy), and invested in the gang's gambling operations.

Eventually the Maceos, with Quinn, opened the Hollywood Dinner Club, at the time the most elegant night club on the Gulf Coast. The club featured crystal chandeliers, a large dance floor, and air conditioning (a new technology at the time; the Hollywood was the first club in the nation to use it). Because of Sam's smooth personality, he became the "face" of the nightclub. Guy Lombardo performed for the club's opening, and Sam attracted a steady stream of celebrity performers thereafter. The club hosted one of the nation's first remote radio broadcasts, and featured Ben Bernie's orchestra (one of the nation's most famous performing groups), which was introduced by a young Walter Cronkite. The club, the first venue in the nation to offer high-class gaming, dining, entertainment, and air conditioning under one roof, was unique at the time.

A crackdown by federal law enforcement led to the arrests of the leaders of the city's gangs, which allowed the Maceo brothers to gain control of the island's underworld. The Maceos gradually invested in numerous clubs and other entertainment ventures in the city involving gambling and bootlegging. Their other big venture, besides the Hollywood, was a club and casino called Maceo's Grotto (later renamed the Balinese Room), which opened in 1929. The Maceos soon controlled most of the gambling and liquor on the island. The Turf Grill/Turf Athletic Club in downtown became their headquarters. Their wealth and Sam's ability to deal with influential figures allowed them to exert increasing influence over other businesses and the government of the island. They established strong relationships with "respectable" business leaders such as the Moodys, the Sealys, and the Kempners. The Maceos' influence on the island lasted for nearly three decades. To compensate for the sometimes-ineffectual police force and judicial system on the island, Rose organized a group of vigilantes known as the Night Riders to keep the peace. Area residents considered the island and their homes entirely safe in spite of rampant criminal activity. The Maceos' bookkeeper was known to walk to the bank carrying millions in deposits without any protection. The Maceos protected the citizens of the island in many ways, such as limiting how much locals were allowed to gamble at the casinos, donating heavily to local charities, and investing in community development.

The Maceo empire soon extended beyond Galveston Island and gradually expanded throughout Galveston County with the family owning more than 60 businesses, as well as slot machines throughout the county. Investments in oil speculation helped to diversify the Maceos' portfolio and add to their wealth. Law enforcement sources accused them of running the narcotics trade as far north as Dallas and Sam was even charged, but authorities were never able to make the charges stick, and indeed some sources claim that they were genuinely false.

== Economy ==
Like much of the country, and particularly Texas, Galveston boomed in the 1920s, but even the Great Depression did not stop Galveston's run of prosperity. Despite the financial ruin that faced much of the country during the Depression, not a single Galveston bank failed and unemployment was almost unheard of. Key business sectors in Galveston during the Free State era were casinos and prostitution, in addition to many legitimate businesses. During much of the period, the vice industries provided the majority of employment. Two families held particular prominence on the island during this era; the Moodys controlled the largest legitimate interests, and the Maceos controlled the largest criminal enterprises. Both families were wealthy, with business empires that extended beyond the island.

=== Legitimate businesses ===
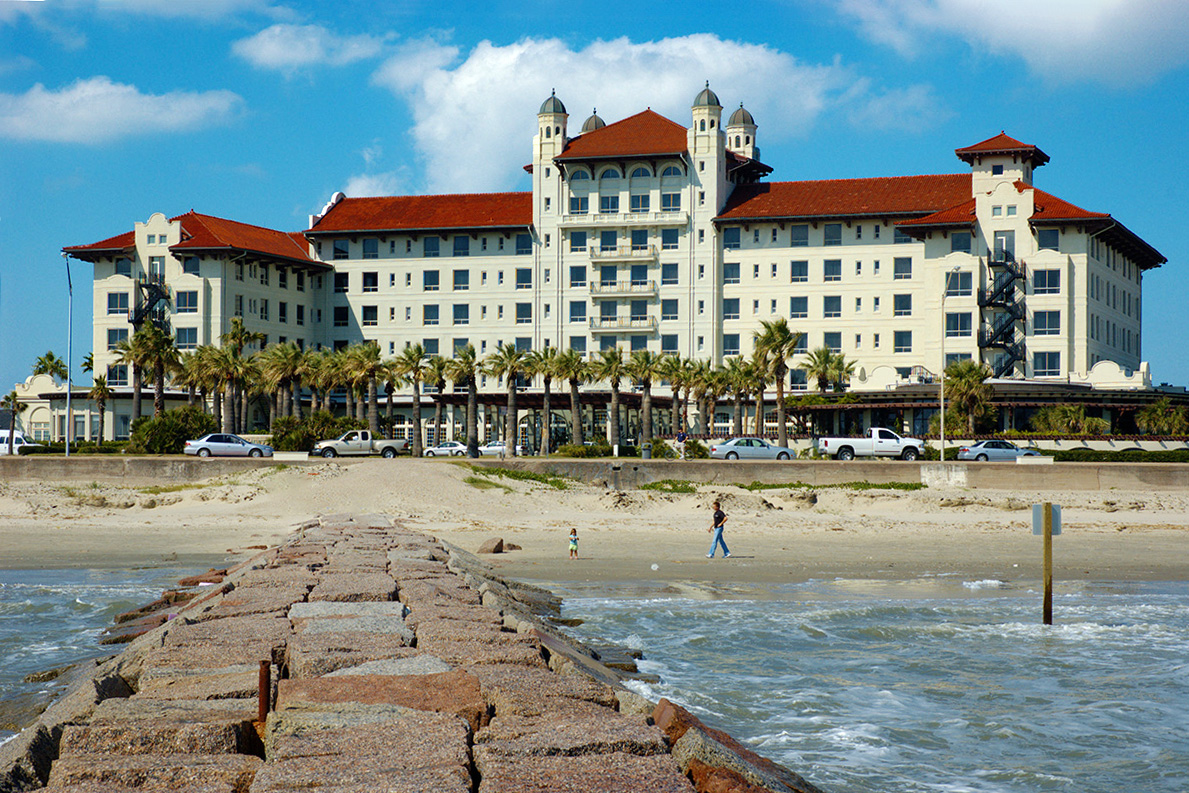
The Hotel Galvez

As the island rebuilt from the 1900 storm, legitimate business interests attempted to expand the economy by rebuilding tourism and further diversifying from shipping. Important nonentertainment businesses included insurance, hotels, banks, shipping, and commercial fishing. The medical and nursing schools, as well as the hospitals of the University of Texas Medical Branch, were a stable sector on the island throughout the 20th century. The Moody family built one of the largest hotel empires in the U.S., and their American National Insurance Company was so successful that it actually grew—tremendously—during the Depression.

In the entertainment sector, various ploys were used to attract tourists. In 1920, an annual beauty contest, named the Pageant of Pulchritude (also known as the Miss Universe contest) in 1926, was started in Galveston by C.E. Barfield, manager of a local amusement park owned by the Maceos. The contest was part of Splash Day, the kick-off of the summer tourist season each year, and became the first international beauty contest, attracting participants from England, Russia, Turkey, and many other nations until its demise in 1932. This contest is said to have served as a model for the modern Miss America pageant and others. At its height, the pageant tripled the island's population the weekend it ran. Even after the international contest's closing, Splash Day was revived in various forms and continued to attract tourists. Other annual events included an extravagant Mardi Gras celebration in spring. The grand Buccaneer Hotel was constructed in 1929 creating an additional hotel landmark to compete with the Galvez (in addition to many other smaller hotel venues).

Much of Galveston's success as a tourist destination was the result of E. Sid Holliday, who became the publicity and convention director of the Galveston Chamber of Commerce in 1925, and later became its head. The chamber helped promote the legitimate face of Galveston's tourism and business community (though it cooperated heavily with the criminal enterprises). Legitimate amusements such as an amusement park that included a Ferris wheel and a roller coaster (the Mountain Speedway), in addition to the beaches and upscale shopping districts (notably the Strand) drew visitors, including those less interested in the city's illegal attractions. One of the most spectacular efforts by the chamber, though not one of the city's greatest successes, was the Pleasure Pier (originally known as the Brantly Harris Recreational Pier). This huge pier (later converted to the Flagship Hotel), built in the 1940s and used by the military until the end of the war, featured restaurants, rides, and an amphitheater.

A significant contributor to the economy through the 1940s was the military. Fort Crockett, the Army Air Base at Scholes Field, the Navy Section Base on Pelican Island, Camp Wallace and the blimp base at Hitchcock all helped pump money into the local economy, as did military shipments at the port and shipbuilding. The soldiers and sailors were a steady stream of customers for area businesses.

=== Vice businesses ===
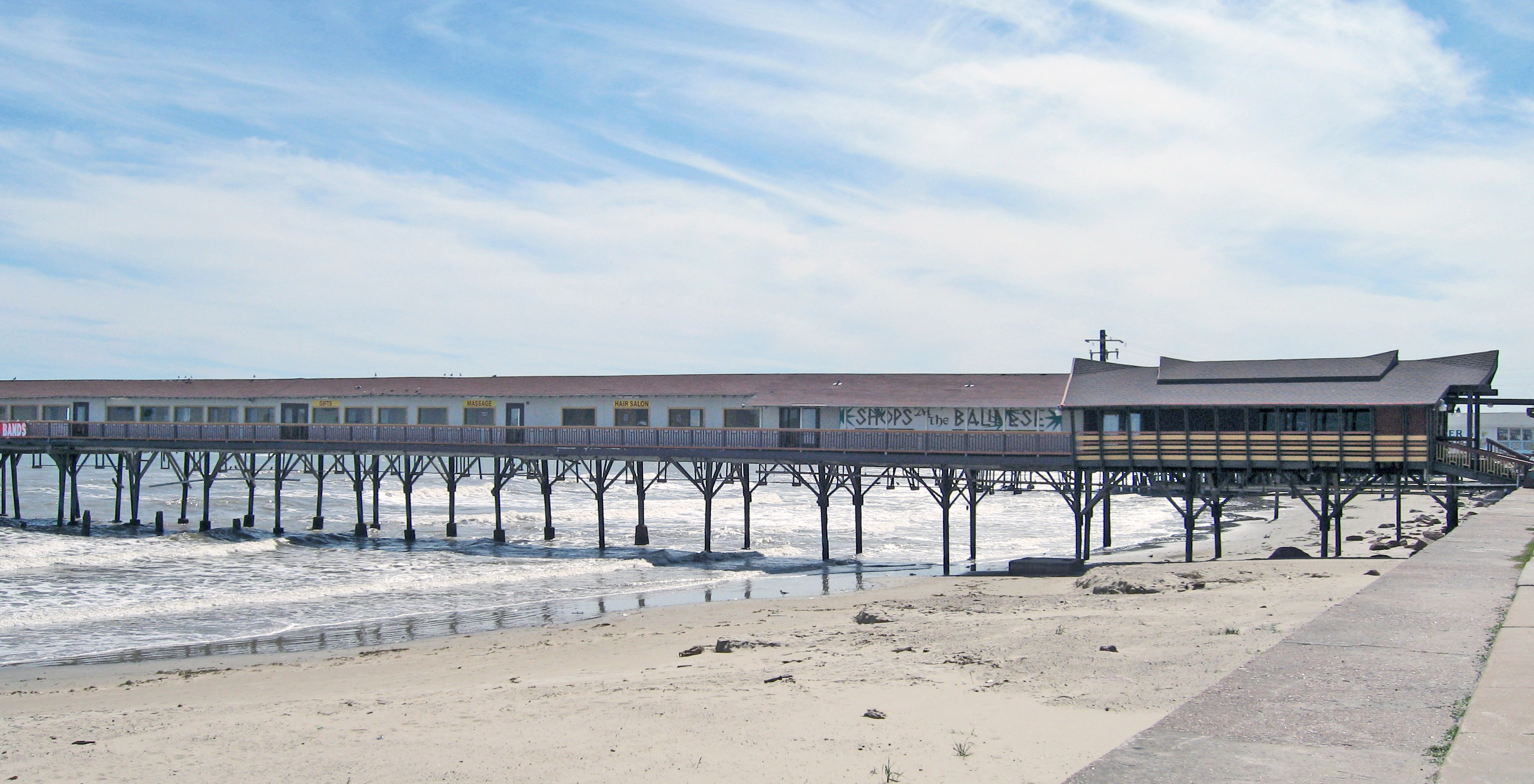
The Balinese Room was once the premier restaurant and casino of the wide-open era.

Casinos offering illegal gambling and drinking were the largest tourist draws on the island. Though the Maceos operated the island's biggest casinos, they generally were very tolerant of competing clubs and casinos, provided their owners understood and respected the Maceos' authority. By the 1930s, Seawall Boulevard was filled with lavish casinos; other areas of town also had pockets of gambling. As late as 1950, about 300 businesses, ranging from grocery stores to barber shops, operated slot machines. Bars were even more ubiquitous; according to one report in 1927, 489 drinking establishments were in the city, more than any other city on the Gulf Coast and among the highest concentrations in the nation. The red-light district, centered on Postoffice Street, was kept entirely separate from the nightclubs and other entertainment venues. It was so successful that the island for a time had the highest concentration of prostitutes in the world (one of every 62 residents), working in more than fifty bordellos in addition to other smaller establishments. The financial success of these vice industries attracted mobsters such as New York's Albert Anastasia and Chicago's Al Capone, who tried to enter Galveston's market without success. Capone's enforcer Frank Nitti, in fact, had been a former partner of Galveston Downtown Gang leader Jack Nounes before the Maceo era.

Galveston became a major port of entry for illegal liquor from Mexico and Canada, shipped through the Caribbean and distributed from the island throughout Texas and to other destinations. William McCoy, known as the "King of the Rum Runners," was a significant figure during this time, helping to supply Galveston with liquor smuggled from the Caribbean. McCoy's operations were critical in sustaining the island's vice economy, particularly during Prohibition when the demand for illegal alcohol soared. Galveston became the primary supplier for Houston, Dallas, Denver, St. Louis and Omaha; indeed some shipments reached as far north as Detroit. This traffic helped to offset the gradual loss of shipping traffic in the cotton and sulfur trades.

The major legitimate businesses on the island, such as banking and hotels, were able to thrive in large part because of the illegal activities. Though many of these business leaders steered clear of direct involvement in the business affairs of the Maceos and the gangs, their relationships were hardly antagonistic. Some, such as financier, hotelier, and insurance executive William Lewis Moody, Jr., actually welcomed illegal gambling because it brought tourists who filled up his hotels. He was even known to make loans to the Maceos' syndicate.

Galveston wasn't the only place in Texas where you could gamble, but it was the only place you didn't have to know where to look.

— Gary Cartwright, Galveston: A History of the Island

The Free State economy was not confined simply to the island, but extended through much of Galveston County. Throughout the county, substantial casino operations were developed by the Fertitta, Salvato, and Maceo families, including the casino districts in Kemah (featuring the Chili Bowl and White House casinos, among others) and Dickinson (featuring the Silver Moon and the Emmite Brothers’ Dickinson Social Club). Houstonians often humorously referred to the Galveston County line as the "Maceo-Dickinson line" (a pun referring to the Mason–Dixon line).

The vice activities on the island and in the county were not unique in Texas. San Antonio had perhaps the second-most infamous red-light district in the early 20th century and most major cities in the state had significant vice activities until at least midcentury, though most went into decline before Galveston's did. During the open era, Galveston's vice industries dominated, while most other areas of the state were at times forced to crack down on vice due to public pressure.

== Culture ==
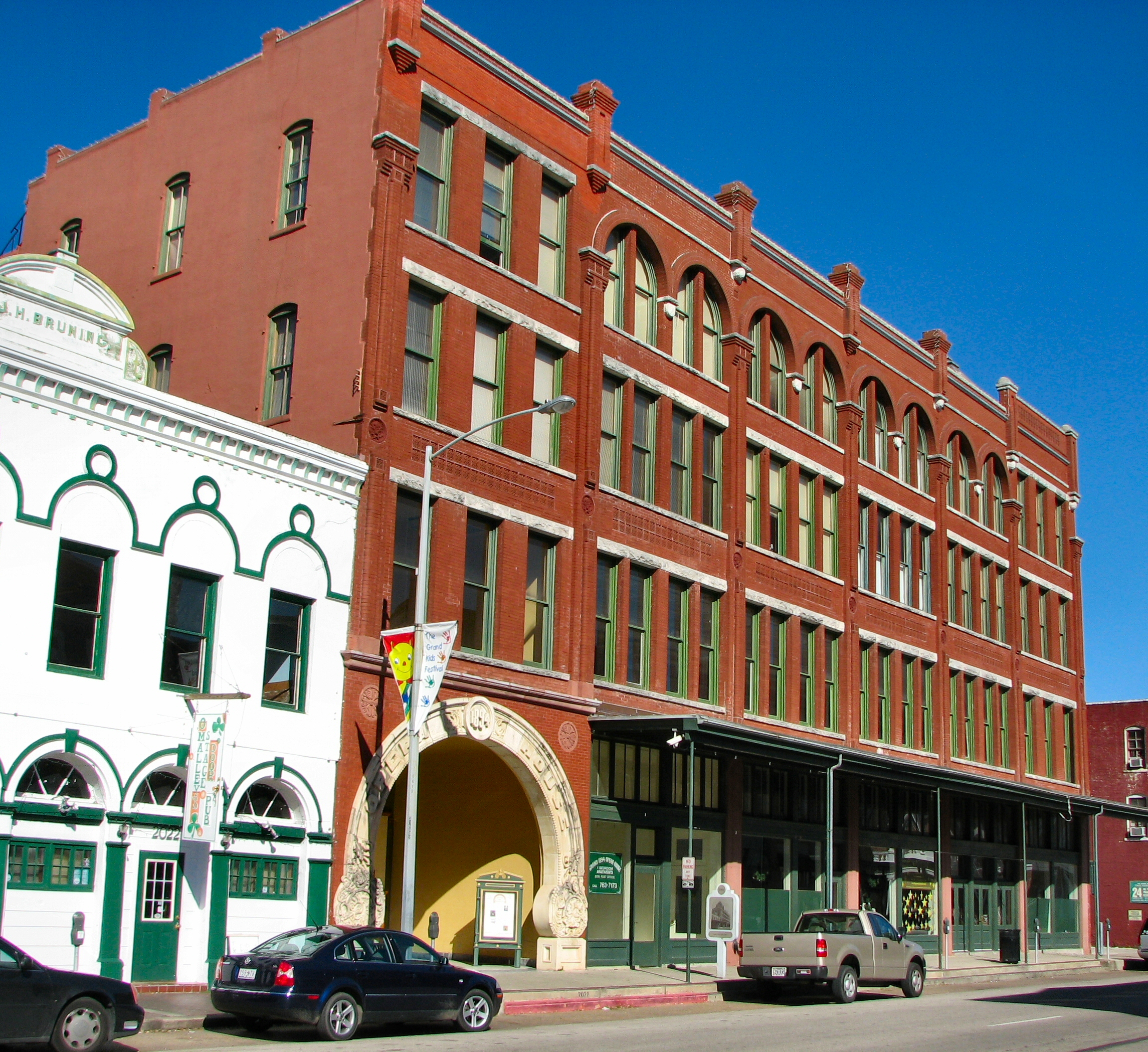
The State Theater (now called the Grand Opera House), a major vaudeville stage of the era

=== Society ===
The city's permissive attitude was not confined to gangs, politicians, and elite businessmen. The citizenry in general took pride in the traditional Galveston approach to freedom. A notable example of this occurred at a political rally where one candidate openly blasted the "hoodlums" running illegal activities. His opponent then addressed the crowd as "my fellow hoodlums", which helped guarantee his victory in the election. Even decades later in 1993, when Vic C. Maceo, cousin of Sam and Rose, opened fire on a local who he believed owed him money, the incident was viewed by many in the community with nostalgia, recalling the Free State era.

Though other parts of Texas and the United States sometimes tolerated prostitution, gambling, and violations of liquor laws (e.g. Dallas is said to have had 27 casinos and numerous brothels during World War II), these communities usually at least made a pretense of trying to enforce vice laws. In Galveston, vice was conducted openly; according to a 1993 Texas Monthly article by author Gary Cartwright, "Galveston's red-light district may have been the only one in the country that thrived with the blessings of both city hall and the Catholic church." So lax were attitudes toward vice that football betting cards were openly sold in the high schools.

High society in the city regularly attracted some of the biggest names in the entertainment business, including Frank Sinatra, Jayne Mansfield, Duke Ellington, and Bob Hope. The clubs were regularly visited by famous Houstonians such as Howard Hughes, Diamond Jim West, and Glenn McCarthy.

Galveston's red-light district may have been the only one in the country that thrived with the blessings of both city hall and the Catholic church.

— Gary Cartwright, Texas Monthly (June 1993)

Galveston's attitudes toward race were at times unique in the region. The strict segregationalist attitudes prevalent in many parts of the U.S. were not always as stark in Galveston's society as in some other parts of Texas. One of the most striking examples of this was the gradual establishment of biracial labor unions of waterfront workers beginning in the 19th century, although eventually this alliance fell victim to segregationist influence. Racist ideology was always an ever-present factor in the city, however, as evidenced by the name of the group which ran the Mardi Gras, the Kotton Karnival Kids (KKK, the same initials as the Ku Klux Klan).

=== Arts ===
The city had numerous venues for the arts, including the State Theater (today the Grand Opera House), which featured vaudeville acts in addition to motion pictures. Less formally, entertainment could be found at the Balinese Room, Hollywood Dinner Club, and other clubs featuring musical performances by major entertainers. Additionally for many years, the city held free concerts on the beach by major orchestras and other performers. The entertainment venues regularly attracted some of the biggest names in the entertainment business, including Frank Sinatra, Sammy Davis Jr., Guy Lombardo, Jack Benny, Gene Autry, Phil Silvers, Jane Russell, Peggy Lee, George Burns, Duke Ellington, and Bob Hope.

=== Sports ===
The Texas League, a baseball league, was founded in the 1800s, temporarily discontinued, and then restarted in the early 1900s evolving into a minor league. During the 1930s, investors in Galveston, particularly Shearn Moody, established the Galveston Buccaneers baseball team, a successor to the former Galveston Pirates. The Buccaneers won the league championship in 1934, but the team was sold in 1937 after Moody's death. After the war, the new Gulf Coast League was established and the Galveston White Caps team was created. Galveston won the championship in 1953, but the team then faded and was disbanded in 1955 as the rest of Galveston's economy was collapsing.

The city created the Oleander Bowl football tournament in 1948, which evolved into the Shrimp Bowl and lasted until 1959. Originally a tournament between colleges in the region, it eventually became a contest between military units. The tournament was never especially successful, only bringing in modest crowds at its peak.

== Government and law enforcement ==
Following the 1900 hurricane, Galveston adopted a commission government (in 1960 the city switched to council-manager system). At the beginning of Prohibition, the city council originally opposed gambling and vice; though the council members were tolerant of small-scale activities which had always been a part of the city, they were more concerned about organized crime. As the Maceos reorganized vice in the city and made these businesses more respectable, the council became far more accepting of the criminal enterprises, particularly as they became linchpins of the local economy. According to some reports, this was because the Maceos bought the cooperation of the council members, taking advantage of the easily corruptible structure of the commission.

Law enforcement at the county level, and to some degree at the state level, became notoriously tolerant of the illegal activities in Galveston, in no small part because of the prosperity they generated, and the bribery and influence peddled by the Maceos. The city police very early on became entirely complicit.

Galveston County Sheriff Frank Biaggne served from 1933 to 1957 and was known for largely disregarding the mainstream illegal activities on the island. When a state committee investigating illegal activities on the island asked the sheriff about his reluctance to raid the Balinese Room, he replied only that it was a "private club" and he was not a "member". The county attorney and the local police commissioner were similarly complicit (Commissioner Johnston once bragged about being on the payroll of 46 brothels). According to a former Texas Ranger, a local justice of the peace would readily issue search warrants for local clubs to the Rangers, but would immediately telephone the owners to warn them.

Law enforcement's corrupt attitude generally was not at the expense of the people. Apart from the economic benefits provided by the Maceos, these bosses provided a high degree of protection to the island's citizens. When serious crimes were committed the local police would sometimes contact the Maceos to have the matter dealt with. However, the island was not completely peaceful; threats at the point of a gun were a common means for the Maceo gang to ensure control. Though the average citizen was relatively safe, gangland slayings of potential rivals did take place on occasion.

== End of an era ==
=== Maceos move on ===
Income of the Maceo operations* (1948–1950)
Year	Real income	Today's dollars
1948	$3.24 million	$43.4 million
1949	$3.43 million	$46.5 million
1950	$3.84 million	$51.3 million
* According to the syndicate's records, though there was testimony of additional hidden profits.

The heyday of the Free State was over by the 1940s. Because of conflicts with the United States Treasury, the Hollywood Dinner Club was shut down in the late 1930s. The local clubs found attracting major entertainment figures to be increasingly difficult. Gambling had been legalized in Nevada in 1931, and this distinct advantage over Galveston, and other illegal gambling centers, gradually lured mob figures such as New York City's Bugsy Siegel to Las Vegas. The competition created by the up-and-coming entertainment center in the desert substantially challenged the island on the Gulf over the next several years. Still, even during its later years, the Balinese Room was able to attract the likes of Tony Bennett and Peggy Lee, among others. And as late as 1950, the annual income of the Maceo empire was reportedly $3.84 million ($51.3 million in today's terms).

By the late 1940s, corruption in Texas at the state and county levels was in decline, while pressure against vice across the state and across the nation was on the rise. Even San Antonio's famed Sporting District, once one of the nation's largest red-light districts, was shut down in 1941. As state investigations of the Maceos' activities became more serious, Sam and Rose began plans to move their empire to Nevada. The Maceos became major investors in the Desert Inn, which was the largest and most elaborate casino resort on the Las Vegas Strip when it opened in 1950. Moe Dalitz (who opened the Desert Inn) and Sam Maceo had long been allies and business partners; indeed, it was the Maceos' influence in the Nevada legislature that made Dalitz's Nevada operations possible. The Las Vegas project's financing was largely facilitated by the Maceos and Moodys through ANICO (which loaned millions to known mob figures). Soon ANICO was one of the largest lenders to Las Vegas casinos. Sam and Rose Maceo transferred controlling interest of most of their Galveston empire to a new group dominated by the Fertitta family, with investments coming from business interests around the island. The Fertitta group never wielded the influence that the Maceos had (though a generation later Tilman and Frank Fertitta came to be major entertainment magnates themselves). Sam Maceo died in 1951, and Rose died in 1954.

=== Free State ends ===
During the 1950s, more dangerous criminal elements took advantage of Galveston's lax law enforcement and the absence of the Maceo brothers' influence. Non-vice crime increased in the city. The New Orleans crime syndicate, headed by Carlos Marcello, ran guns to Cuba through the island. Fugitives such as suspected JFK plotter David Ferrie used Galveston as a safe haven.

By the 1950s, gambling and prostitution were being actively repressed in most parts of Texas. In 1953, the police commissioner, Walter L. Johnston, under pressure from local citizens groups concerned about moral decline and high rates of venereal disease, shut down the red-light district. However, the mayoral victory of George Roy Clough, a supporter of regulated vice, led to the district's being re-established in 1955. That year, Galveston was labeled by national anti-prostitution groups as the "worst spot in the nation as far as prostitution is concerned".

Paul Hopkins won the 1956 election for sheriff and set about shutting down the island's illegal activities once and for all. One of the first successful busts of the gambling industry was an undercover operation by Texas Ranger Clint Peoples at the Balinese Room. In 1957, Attorney General Will Wilson and Department of Public Safety head Homer Garrison (with help from former FBI special agent Jim Simpson) began a massive campaign of raids that wrecked the gambling and prostitution industry on the island, along with liquor imports. Forty-seven clubs, brothels, and other vice establishments were reportedly closed, and 2,000 slot machines were destroyed. Though officials said they destroyed all of the city's gaming equipment, some locals including R.S. Maceo, nephew of Sam and Rose, claimed that most of the equipment was shipped to Las Vegas before authorities ever discovered it.

=== Aftermath ===
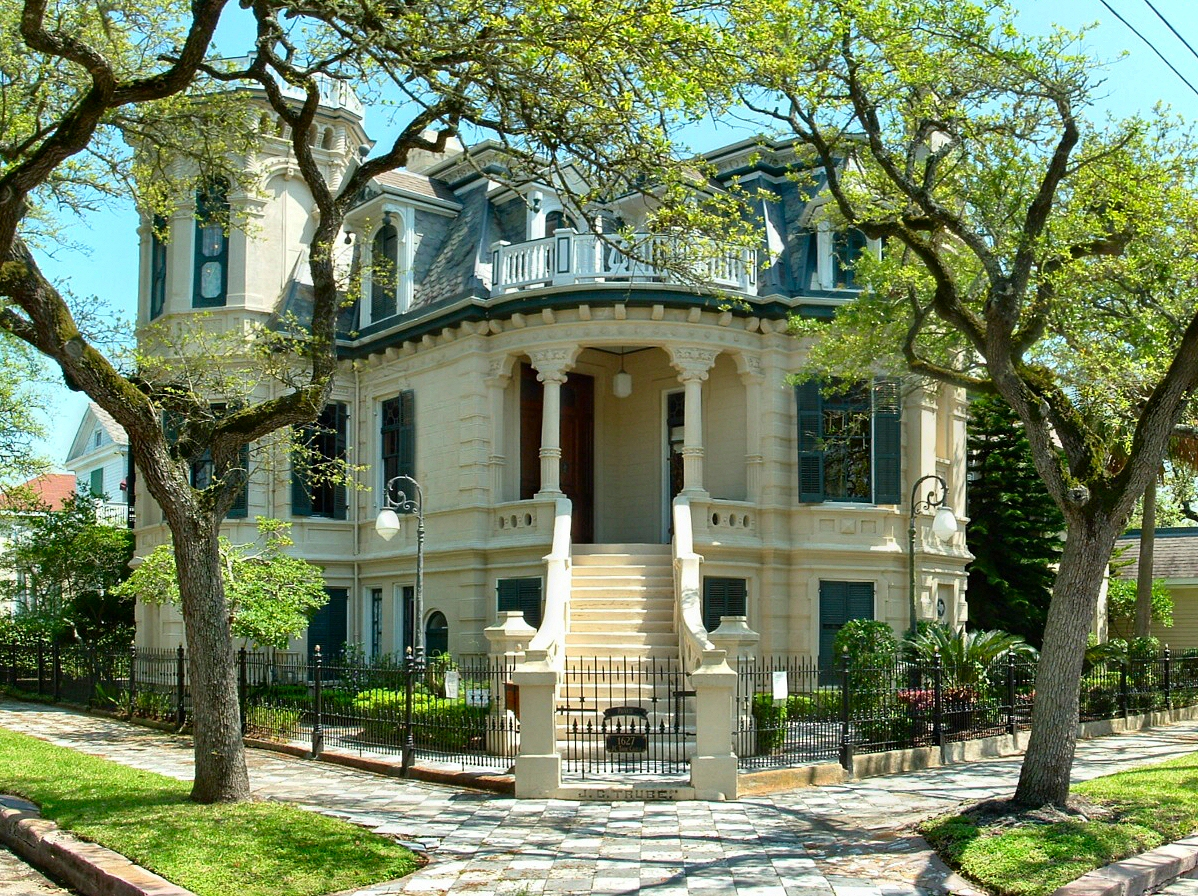
Trube Castle, one of the many historic structures preserved in the city

As the vice industries crashed, so did tourism, and the rest of the Galveston economy declined with it. The economy stagnated during the 1950s, and after 1957, the Free State was effectively gone. Fort Crockett, which had been used as an Army recreation center following the war, was shut down in 1955. Many of the island's most important entertainment business leaders left the city and set up shop in Las Vegas. Neither the economy nor the culture of the city was the same afterward. Civic leaders made several failed attempts at new ventures, including the Oleander Bowl football tournament (1948) and the Pelican Island bridge (1956) for access to a new industrial park, which never materialized. The city's television station, KGUL, moved to Houston in 1959; the telephone company headquarters and many other businesses relocated off the island, as well. To make matters worse, some of the island's attractions were destroyed by Hurricane Carla in 1961 and never rebuilt.

The economy continued in muted form. The three main establishment families on the island, the Moodys, the Sealys, and Kempners, had essentially unrivalled control of the island. The Splash Day celebrations restarted, drawing tourists to the coast. Many hotels, banks, and some insurance companies remained, as did the medical and nursing schools, and the hospitals. Efforts at historical preservation (notably including those of George P. Mitchell) gradually helped to re-establish the island's tourism industry, though in a very different form from the past. Nonbinding referendums were put forward in the 1980s regarding legalization of casinos in the city, but were defeated by the voters each time, demonstrating the changes in the city since the bygone era. Informal polls in 2008 and 2010 indicate this sentiment may be changing. Indeed, gambling aboard cruise ships leaving from Galveston is now commonplace.

== In popular culture ==
Though this era in Galveston's history has not received a great deal of attention in popular culture (compared, for example, to Al Capone's Chicago), some popular fiction and true crime story-telling have centered on the era. Some notable examples include the novels Under the Skin by James Carlos Blake, Last Dance on the Starlight Pier by Sarah Bird, No Greater Deception: A True Texas Story by Sydney Dotson, Galveston by Suzanne Morris, and Overlords by Matt Braun, as well as the anthology Lone Star Sleuths: An Anthology of Texas Crime Fiction by Bill Davis, et al. Galveston's Balinese Room was also the subject of a 1975 song by rock band ZZ Top.

Galveston, The Musical! opened in 2003 at Galveston's Strand Theatre and in 2011 at the Hobby Center in Houston. The musical theater production centers on the arrival of the Maceo brothers and the empire they created during this period of the island's history.

== See also ==
- American Mafia
- Gambling in the United States
- History of the Galveston Bay Area
- History of vice in Texas
- Other illegal gambling empires of the 1920s–1950s:

- Miami
- New Orleans
- Atlantic City, New Jersey
- Hot Springs, Arkansas
- Newport, Kentucky
- Phenix City, Alabama
