= Seawall Boulevard =

Road in Galveston, TX, USA

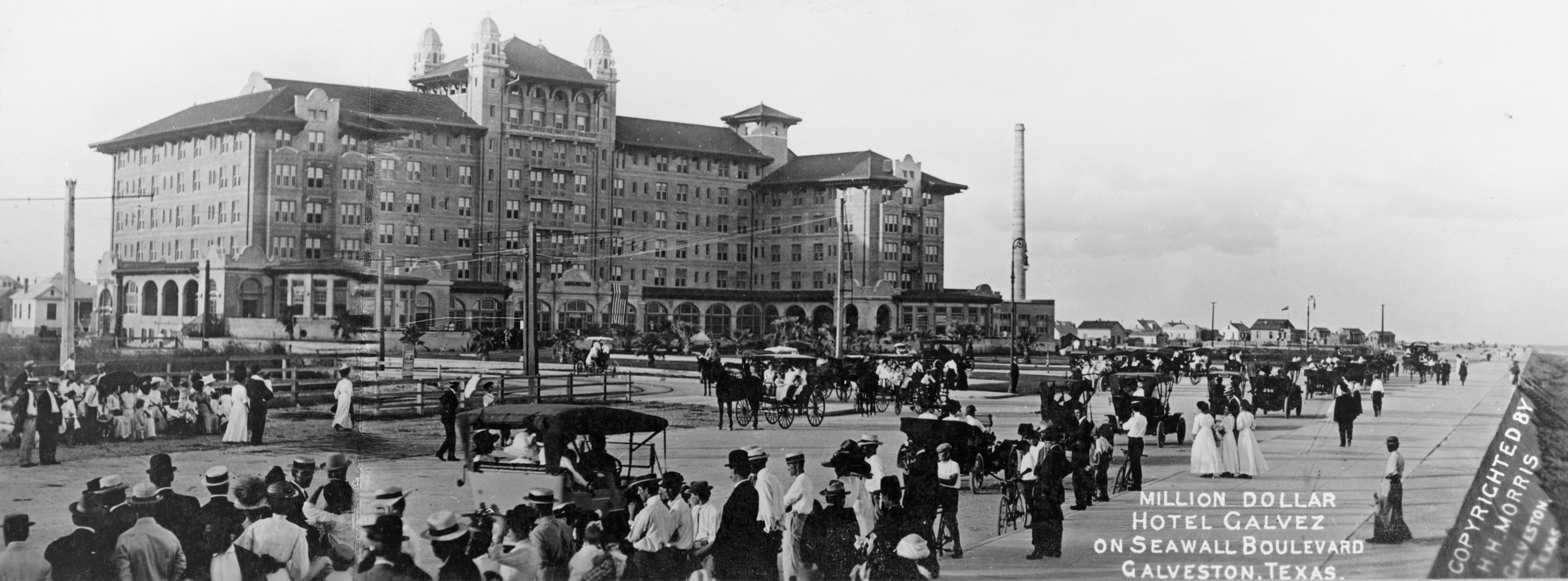
Hotel Galvez on Seawall Boulevard in 1911

Seawall Boulevard is a major road in Galveston, Texas in the United States. The boulevard is conterminous with Farm to Market Road 3005 south of 61st Street. It runs along the Gulf coast waterfront of the island near the main parts of the city, and is the longest, continuous sidewalk in the United States at 10.3 miles long. It is named for the Galveston Seawall built along the beaches.

Seawall Boulevard is home to several hotels and entertainment venues including the famous Hotel Galvez.

In 2011 a voter referendum which passed by the Seawall Enhancement Campaign led to a creation of a parking management district where motorists who park on Seawall Boulevard would pay up to $8 per day or $25 annually where revenue from paid parking is used for Seawall enhancements. Paid parking is waived on the Fourth of July, Mardi Gras, and the Lone Star Rally but due to the budget shortfall of the first six months of the Seawall Enhancement Campaign parking revenues are still collected despite the provisions stated during the 2011 election. A sunset clause which was part of the 2011 referendum eliminates paid parking after 7 years of service. Paid seawall parking was phased in since July 11, 2013 which is slated to expire July 11, 2020 where a continuation of the Seawall Enhancement Campaign after the 7-year contract requires another voter referendum to be placed on the May 2020 voter ballot for the City of Galveston municipal elections. December 2016 marked the end of an era where 24 hour parking is a thing of the past - the Galveston City Council approved a 3-5 a.m. curfew where some beachgoers have monopolized parking spaces on both sides of the Seawall from Broadway to 101st Street with the exception of the designated areas around the 61st and 94th Street Pier used by fishermen.

== Open Era ==
During Galveston's Open Era the road became quite famous as a lavish, nationally known tourist venue and casino district featuring elegant hotels and clubs. The boulevard's prominence began with the construction of the club and casino Maceo's Grotto (later called the Balinese Room) in 1929. Other famous locations on this road included Murdoch's Bath House, the Buccaneer Hotel, the Pleasure Pier, and the Mountain Speedway roller coaster.

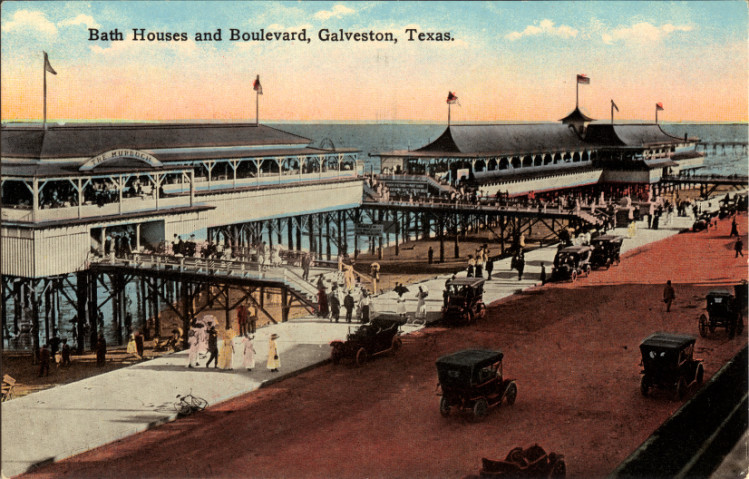
Bath Houses and Boulevard, Galveston, Texas [The Murdoch] (postcard, circa 1915-1924)

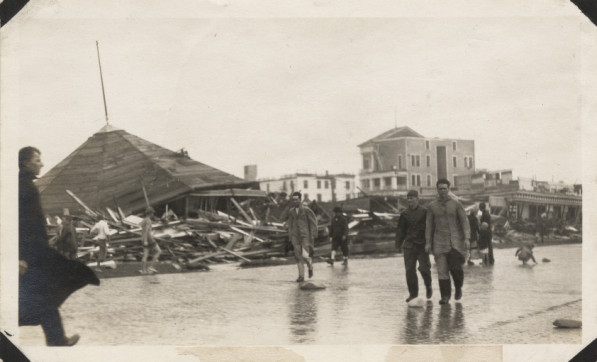
Murdoch's Bathhouse Wreckage after 1915 Galveston Hurricane

The boulevard became the focal point for tourism events such as the International Pageant of Pulchritude of the 1920s, the first international beauty contest. The event would be held on the beach in front of the seawall attracting tourists from around the nation and media attention from around the world. Other events along the boulevard included the spectacular Mardi Gras parade and celebration.

This era of prosperity declined during the 1940s and ended in the 1950s with the closing of the casinos by the Texas Rangers.
