= Ollie Quinn =

American mob boss (1893–1949)

Ollie J. Quinn
- Born: 26 May 1893; Navarro County, Texas, U.S.
- Died: August 23, 1949 (aged 56); Fairfield, Texas, U.S.
- Known for: Mobster, gang leader
- Successor: Sam Maceo and Rosario Maceo
- Allegiance: Sam Maceo's Organization

Ollie Johnson Quinn (26 May 1893 – 23 August 1949) was a mob boss in Galveston, Texas in the United States, who was involved in bootlegging, illegal gambling, numbers racket, prostitution and other criminal activities from the 1910s up until the 1930s. He, with Dutch Voight, led the Beach Gang, one of the two criminal organisations which controlled most of the Galveston underworld until the mid-1920s.

He was generally considered the dominant figure in vice, especially gambling, on the island and was respected by most Galveston residents and other Galveston County inhabitants alike. His main casino, the Deluxe Club, was a fixture in the city. His Modern Vending Company leased gaming equipment such as slot machines to area businesses. Quinn was known for being, above all, a businessman who was accepting of honest competition in the vice business.

Quinn became a mentor, and then a partner, to Sam and Rosario Maceo, who later took over the Galveston underworld.

== See also ==
- Free State of Galveston
- Johnny Jack Nounes
- Rosario Maceo
- Sam Maceo

== Learn more ==
- Cartwright, Gary (1998). Galveston: a history of the island. New York: Macmillan. ISBN 0-87565-190-9.
- McComb, David G. (1986). Galveston: a history. Austin, Texas: University of Texas Press. ISBN 978-0-292-72053-4.
- Nieman, Robert (Fall 2008). "Galveston's Balinese Room" (PDF). Texas Ranger Dispatch (27). Texas Ranger Association Foundation.
