= Dutch Voight =

German American mobster, gang leader

Dutch Voigt
- Born: Oscar Ernest Voigt; November 18, 1888; Brenham, Texas, U.S.
- Died: May 15, 1986 (aged 97); Galveston, Texas, U.S.
- Known for: Mobster, gang leader
- Successor: Sam Maceo and Rosario Maceo
- Partner: Ollie Quinn

Oscar Ernest "Dutch" Voigt was an American mob boss in Galveston, Texas in the United States, who was involved in bootlegging, illegal gambling, numbers racket, prostitution and other criminal activities during the early 1900s. Voight was called Dutch for Deutsch meaning German. He, with Ollie Quinn, led the Beach Gang, one of the two criminal organisations which controlled most of the Galveston underworld until the mid-1920s. He was of German descent.

Voigt ushered in the modern era of gambling on the island by establishing organized poker games in 1910 and was known as Quinn's top advisor in the criminal business. He and Quinn soon ran games all over the city.

== See also ==
- Free State of Galveston
- Johnny Jack Nounes
- Ollie Quinn
- Rosario Maceo
- Sam Maceo
- George Musey
