= Frank Nitti =

Italian-American mob boss (1886–1943)

- Born: Francesco Raffaele Nitto; January 27, 1886; Angri, Campania, Kingdom of Italy
- Died: March 19, 1943 (aged 57); North Riverside, Illinois, U.S.
- Cause of death: Suicide by firearm
- Resting place: Mount Carmel Cemetery, Hillside, Illinois, U.S.
- Other name: The Enforcer
- Occupation: Crime boss
- Predecessor: Al Capone
- Successor: Paul Ricca
- Spouses: Rosa Levitt (m. 1917; div. 1928) Anna Ronga (m. 1928; died 1940) Annette Caravetta (m. 1942)
- Children: 1
- Allegiance: Chicago Outfit
- Criminal charges: Tax evasion (1931)
- Penalty: 18 months' imprisonment (1931)

Frank Ralph Nitto (born Francesco Raffaele Nitto, Italian: [franˈtʃesko raffaˈɛːle ˈnitto]; January 27, 1886 – March 19, 1943), known as Frank Nitti, was an Italian-American organized crime figure based in Chicago. The bodyguard of Al Capone, Nitti was in charge of all money flowing through the operation. Nitti later succeeded Capone as acting boss of the Chicago Outfit.

== Early life and prohibition ==
Nitti (Note: While the name Frank Nitti has become infamous in American criminal history, the man himself never at any point in his life referred to himself as anything other than his legal surname, Nitto; only the police, media, and fringe mobsters called him Nitti.) was born Francesco Raffaele Nitto on January 27, 1886, in the town of Angri, province of Salerno, Campania, Italy. He was the second child of Luigi and Rosina (Fezza) Nitto. While later journalists reported Nitti and Al Capone were cousins, this was not the case, but their families did live blocks away from each other in Brooklyn, and had come from the same area in Italy.

His father died in 1888, when Frank was two years old. Within a year, his mother married Francesco Dolendo. Although two children were born to the couple, neither survived, leaving Francesco and his older sister, Giovannina, the only children.

Francesco Dolendo emigrated to the United States in July 1890, and the rest of the family followed in June 1893 when Nitti was seven. The family settled at 113 Navy Street, Brooklyn, New York City. Little Francesco attended public school and worked odd jobs after school to support the family. His 15-year-old sister married a 24-year-old man. His mother gave birth to his half-brother Raphael in 1894 and another child, Gennaro, in 1896.

After the seventh grade, he quit school and worked as a pinsetter, factory worker, and barber. Al Capone's family lived nearby, and Nitti was friends with Capone's older brothers and their criminal gang (the Navy Street Boys).

A worsening relationship with Dolendo urged him to leave home in 1900 when Nitti was 14, to work in various local factories. Around 1910, at the age of 24, he left Brooklyn. The next years of his life are poorly documented, and little can be ascertained. He may have worked in the Williamsburg neighborhood of Brooklyn around 1911. He probably moved to Chicago around 1913, working as a barber and making the acquaintance of gangsters Alex Louis Greenberg and Dean O'Banion. He married Chicagoan Rosa (Rose) Levitt in Dallas, Texas, on October 18, 1917. The couple's movements after their marriage remain uncertain.

By 1918, Nitti had settled at 914 South Halsted Street. Nitti quickly renewed his contacts with Greenberg and O'Banion, becoming a jewel thief, liquor smuggler, and fence. Through his liquor smuggling activities, Nitti came to the attention of Chicago crime boss John "Papa Johnny" Torrio and Torrio's newly arrived soldier, Al Capone. Nitti, being a newcomer, and familiar with the Texas area, became a partner in the Galveston crime syndicate run by Johnny Jack Nounes. He is reported to have stolen a large sum of money from Nounes and fellow mobster Dutch Voight in 1924, after which Nitti fled back to Chicago. Years later, he was spotted at a Houston bar, which was brought to the attention of Nounes and Voight. The two Galveston mobsters found Nitti, drove him back to Galveston, and made him return the money he had stolen.

Under Torrio's successor, Al Capone, Nitti's reputation soared. Nitti ran Capone's liquor smuggling and distribution operation, importing whisky from Canada and selling it through a network of speakeasies around Chicago. Nitti was one of Capone's top lieutenants, trusted for his leadership skills and business acumen. Because Nitti's ancestry was from the same town as Capone's, he could help Capone penetrate the Sicilian and Camorra underworld in a way Capone alone never could.

Capone thought so highly of Nitti that when he went to prison in 1929, he named Nitti as a member of a triumvirate that ran the mob in his place. Nitti was head of operations, with Jake "Greasy Thumb" Guzik as head of administration and Tony "Joe Batters" Accardo as head of enforcement. Despite his nickname, "The Enforcer", Nitti used Mafia soldiers and others to commit violence rather than do it himself. In earlier days, Nitti had been one of Capone's trusted personal bodyguards. Still, as he rose in the organization, Nitti's business instinct dictated that he must personally avoid the "dirty work" for which hitmen were paid. Frank and Rose divorced in 1928, and shortly thereafter, he married Anna Ronga, daughter of a mob doctor and former neighbor of the Nittis in the 1920s. The couple adopted a son, Joseph, through the Tennessee Children's Home Society.

== The Outfit under Nitti ==
In 1931, both Nitti and Capone were convicted of tax evasion and sent to prison; however, Nitti received an 18-month sentence which was served at the United States Penitentiary, Leavenworth, while Capone was sent away for 11 years. When Nitti was released on March 25, 1932, he took his place as the new boss of the Capone Gang.

While some revisionist historians claim that Nitti was a mere "front boss" while Paul "The Waiter" Ricca was the actual boss of the Chicago Outfit, both contemporary and modern accounts confirm that Capone's successor was indeed Nitti. According to Nitti biographer Mars Eghigian, Nitti's age, brilliance, and reputation in the underworld made him Capone's personal choice for successor, rather than younger, less experienced mobsters such as Ricca or Murray Humphreys.

In actuality, Ricca was merely the acting boss of the Chicago Outfit for six months between Capone's October 1931 imprisonment and Nitti's March 1932 release. With the recently released Nitti paranoid about violating his federal parole, Ricca was acting in the capacity of emissary that same month when he was arrested with Lucky Luciano, Meyer Lansky, and other mobsters by Chicago police and prominently photographed. This picture caused some to incorrectly conclude that Ricca was the new boss of the Chicago mob.

With Nitti calling the shots, the Chicago Outfit branched out from prostitution and gambling into other areas, including control of labor unions (which led to the extortion of many businesses). On December 19, 1932, a team of Chicago police, headed by Detective Sergeants Harry Lang and Harry Miller, raided Nitti's office in Room 554 at 221 N. LaSalle Street in Chicago. Lang shot Nitti three times in the back and neck. He then shot himself (a minor flesh wound) to make the shooting look like self-defense, claiming that Nitti had shot him first.

Court testimony later insisted that the murder attempt was personally ordered by newly elected Chicago Mayor Anton Cermak, who supposedly wanted to eliminate the Chicago Outfit in favor of gangsters who answered to him. Nitti survived the shooting and in February 1933 was acquitted of attempted murder. During that same trial, Miller testified that Lang received $15,000 (equal to $373,072 today) to kill Nitti. Another uniformed officer at the shooting testified that Nitti was shot while unarmed. Harry Lang and Harry Miller were both fired from the police force and each fined $100 (equal to $2,487 today) for simple assault.

Two months later, Cermak was shot and killed by Giuseppe Zangara while he was talking to President-elect Franklin D. Roosevelt; Roosevelt was Zangara's target, but missed. A conspiracy theory emerged sometime before 1999, originating in Chicago, asserting that Zangara was a hired killer working for Nitti. John William Tuohy, author of numerous books on organized crime in Chicago, after reviewing Secret Service records, described in detail in a 2002 article his interpretation of how and why Cermak was the real target and the relationship of the shooting to the rampant gang violence in Chicago. The theory is enhanced by numerous researchers, citing their analysis of court testimony, asserting that Cermak had directed an assassination attempt on Nitti less than three months earlier.

Anna Nitto died on November 19, 1940, in Mercy Hospital, Chicago, from an unspecified internal ailment. Nitti married Annette (Toni) Caravetta on May 14, 1942; she was widowed almost a year later when he committed suicide.

== Death ==
In 1943, many top members of the Chicago Outfit were indicted for extorting the Hollywood film industry. Among those prosecuted were Nitti, Phil D'Andrea, Louis "Little New York" Campagna, Nick Circella, Charles "Cherry Nose" Gioe, Ralph Pierce, Ricca, and John "Handsome Johnny" Roselli. The Outfit was accused of trying to extort money from some of the largest movie studios, including Columbia Pictures, Metro-Goldwyn-Mayer, Paramount Pictures, RKO Pictures, and 20th Century Fox. The studios had cooperated with The Outfit to avoid union trouble (unrest itself stirred up by the mob).

At a meeting of Outfit leaders at Nitti's home, Ricca blamed Nitti for the indictments. Ricca said that since this had been Nitti's scheme and that of the FBI informant (Willie Bioff), one of Nitti's trusted associates, Nitti should go to prison. A severe claustrophobe due to his first prison term, Nitti dreaded the idea of another prison confinement. It was also rumored that he was suffering from terminal cancer at this time. He ultimately decided to take his own life.

The day before his scheduled grand jury appearance, Nitti had breakfast with his wife in their home at 712 Selborne Road in Riverside, Illinois. When his wife was leaving for church, Nitti told her he planned to take a walk; then he began to drink heavily. He loaded a .32 caliber revolver, put it in his coat pocket, and walked five blocks to a local railroad yard. Conductor William F. Seebauer and switchmen L.M. Barnett and E.H. Moran were riding in the caboose, backing their train slowly southward over an ungated Cermak Road in North Riverside. The workers spotted an oblivious Nitti walking on the track away from them and shouted a warning. Nitti walked off the tracks, staggering towards the fence. Three shots rang out. The workers thought Nitti was shooting at them but then realized he was trying to shoot himself in the head. The final, fatal bullet entered behind Nitti's right ear and lodged in the top of his skull. Police Chief Allen Rose of North Riverside, rushing to the scene with a sergeant and several beat patrolmen, recognized Nitti immediately. An autopsy by William McNalley, coroner's toxicologist, showed that Nitti's blood alcohol level was 0.23. A coroner's jury ruled the following day that Nitti "committed suicide while temporarily insane and in a despondent frame of mind".

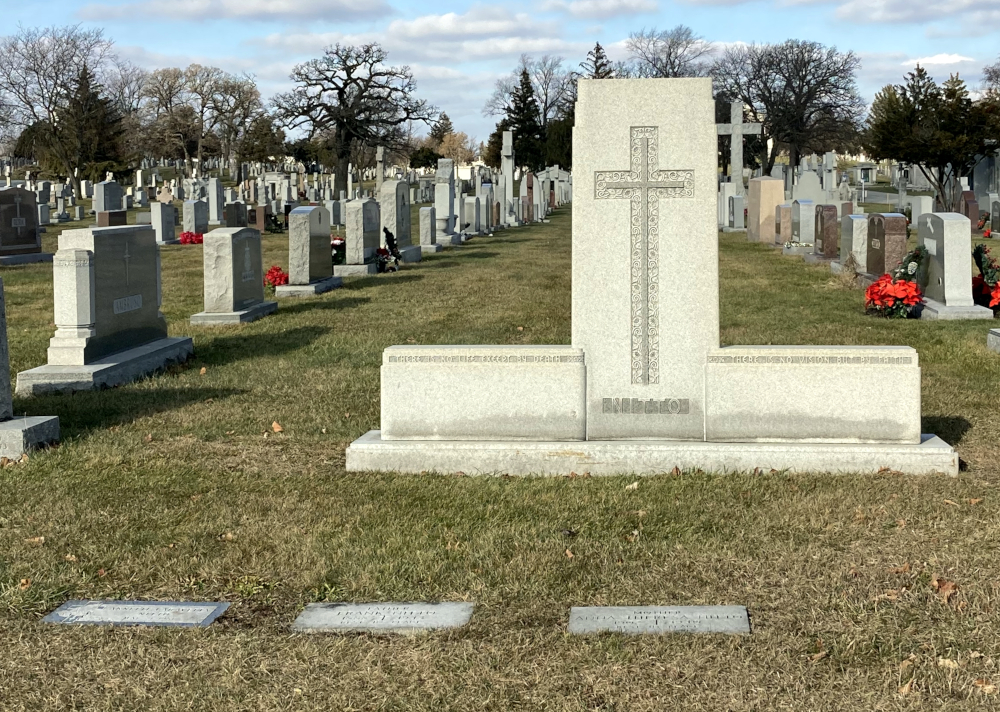
Nitti's grave at Mount Carmel Cemetery

Frank Nitti died on March 19, 1943, at the age of 57. Nitti is buried at Mount Carmel Cemetery in Hillside, Illinois. Controversy has persisted regarding the interment of a suicide in a Catholic cemetery. Nitti's grave can be found to the left of the main Roosevelt Road entrance, about 50 feet (15 m) from the gate. To the right of the gate is the family plot containing the grave of Al Capone, marked by a 6-foot (180 cm) white monument stone. Straight up from the gate are the graves of Dean O'Banion and Hymie Weiss, both North Side Gang members who the Chicago Outfit killed under Capone.

== In popular culture ==
=== Media ===
- Nitti is portrayed by Bruce Gordon in many episodes of the original ABC television series The Untouchables, based on Eliot Ness's memoirs, which ran from 1959 to 1963.
- He is portrayed by Harold J. Stone in the 1967 Roger Corman film The St. Valentine's Day Massacre.
- In the 1972 film, The Godfather, the montage of crime scene photos of the war between the Five Families includes the photo of Frank Nitti found dead.
- He is portrayed by Sylvester Stallone in the 1975 film Capone. Nitti starts off as a bodyguard, assassin, and adviser under Capone (Ben Gazzara) before secretly betraying him and selling the IRS files that led to Capone's arrest for tax evasion. As the new head of the Chicago Outfit, he is last seen visiting the dying Capone at his Palm Island estate in 1946, a year before Capone's death and three years after Nitti's actual suicide.
- In the 1983 film Easy Money, the Frank Nitti is the name of a kind of pizza ordered to Rodney Dangerfield's character's house.
- Billy Drago plays a fictionalized version of Nitti in the 1987 film The Untouchables. In the film, Nitti dies after being thrown off a Chicago courthouse roof by Ness (Kevin Costner) during Al Capone's tax evasion trial in the early 1930s, well before his suicide in 1943.
- He is portrayed by Anthony LaPaglia in the 1988 biopic Nitti: The Enforcer.
- He is portrayed by Paul Regina in the 1993 TV show The Untouchables.
- He is portrayed by Stanley Tucci in the 2002 film Road to Perdition.
- He is portrayed by Bill Camp in the 2009 film Public Enemies.
- He is portrayed by Will Sasso in the 2013 Comedy Central series Drunk History.

=== Sports ===
Ice hockey goaltender Antero Niittymäki has used an image of Nitti on his helmet due to the similarity of their names.

== Notes ==
American Mafia
Preceded by Al Capone	Chicago Outfit; Underboss; 1925–1931	Succeeded by Louis Campagna
Preceded by Al Capone	Chicago Outfit; Boss; 1931–1943	Succeeded by Paul Ricca
