= Power broker =

Person who influences people

In political science, a power broker is a person who influences people to vote towards a particular client (i.e. elected official or referendum) in exchange for political and financial benefits. Power brokers can also negotiate deals with other power brokers to meet their aims. The term is sometimes used for a non-elected person with political influence.

== Area of greatest influence ==
Power brokers can demand more benefits in closely contested areas and policies. They can play both sides and influence voters for the highest bidder. These brokers wield great influence over voters who may be dedicated to one issue that draws them into the electoral process but undecided on others. Hence, the brokers maintain their influence by denying loyalty to a political party or other political label. Modern examples of prominent figures include Henry Kissinger, Jim Clyburn, Nancy Pelosi, and George Norcross. In Australian politics in the state of New South Wales, Eddie Obeid was considered one of the most powerful men in politics, with his factional leadership being wielded for gains both political and monetary, which eventually saw him jailed for 7 years on corruption charges.

== See also ==
- Broker
- Patronage
- Balance of power
- The Power Elite
- Superdelegate
