= A Weekend in September =

Book by John Edward Weems

A Weekend in September is a 1957 book by John Edward Weems. It is about the 1900 Galveston hurricane.

A 1980 reprinting was published by the Texas A&M University Press. In 2005 the university made the book's 10th printing.

Weems had interviewed people who had experienced the events and used other sources from the era.

== Reception ==
Dean R. Larson of Purdue University Calumet (now Purdue University Northwest) stated that the imagery is "so alive with detail that this reader needed a self reminder that the book is not fiction".

Ralph A. Wooster of Lamar University stated that the research was "skillful".
