= Mythic Galveston =

Non-fiction book by Susan Hardwick

Mythic Galveston: Reinventing America's Third Coast is a 2002 non-fiction book by Susan Hardwick. It discusses the geography and history of Galveston, Texas, published by Johns Hopkins University Press.

The author's field is geography.

== Reception ==
Patricia B. Bixel of Maine Maritime Academy overall criticized the book. She stated that maps and tables had some utility but that in some places the maps do not match the relevant figures. Bixel criticized unsourced content and a lack of context and argued that historians would not get use out of the book.

Patrick H. Butler III of the Virginia Board of Historic Resources felt that the book had use as a history of Galveston but that it "fails to carry out many of its goals" with the portions about the city in the 20th century being "The most disappointing element" due to being underdeveloped.

Peter J. Hugill of Texas A&M University criticized the book for being "unfocused and often careless" and in conclusion stated the work "is an almost total failure. Galveston deserves better!"

James C. Maroney of Lee College gave a positive review, despite having some criticisms.
