= Willis Luther Moore =

American meteorologist (1856–1927)

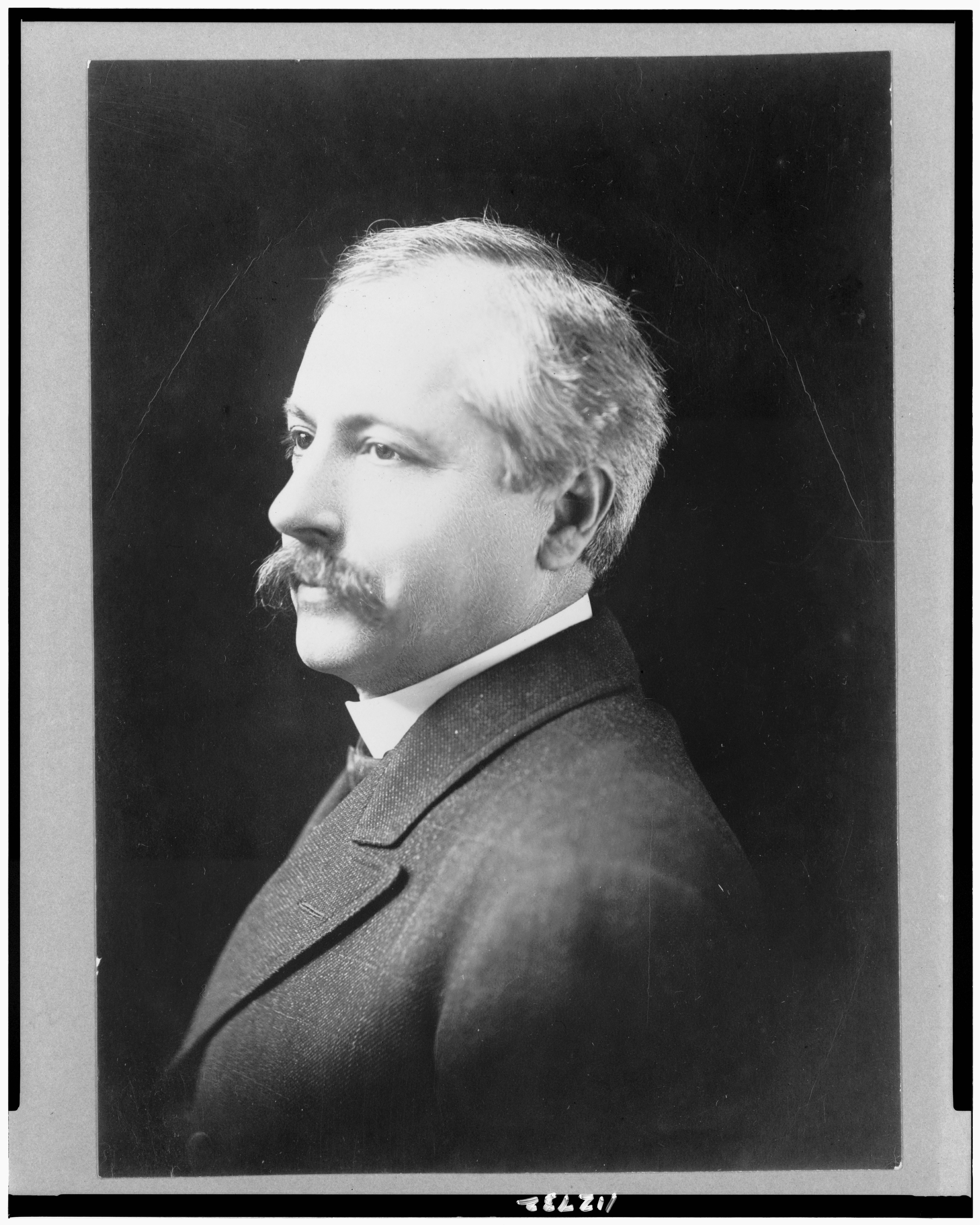
- Born: January 18, 1856; Scranton, Pennsylvania
- Died: December 18, 1927 (aged 71); Pasadena, California
- Spouse: Mary Lozier (m. 1884; div. 1924) Doris Pilling (m. 1926)
- Parents: Luther T. Moore (father); Lucy E. Babcock (mother)

Willis Luther Moore (January 18, 1856 – December 18, 1927) was an American meteorologist, author, and educator. He was chief of the U.S. Weather Bureau, 1895–1913, and president of the National Geographic Society, 1905–1910.

== Biography ==
Moore was born in Scranton, Pennsylvania, on January 18, 1856, the son of Luther T. Moore and Lucy E. Babcock. During his youth the family lived on a farm in the Susquehanna Valley in New York. His father served in Grant's army during the American Civil War, where the eight-year-old Moore joined him at City Point, selling newspapers to the Union troops. Moore received his early education in Binghamton, New York public schools.

At the age of seventeen, Moore went to work for The Republican, a New York newspaper, as a printer and reporter. After an attempt to seek gold in the Black Hills failed, he worked as a printer for The Hawk Eye in Burlington, Iowa. In 1876 he took the entrance exam for the meteorological training school of the Signal Service. He reached the grade of observer sergeant in 1886. By 1891, he was the Milwaukee, Wisconsin district weather forecaster, then a forecast official for the upper lakes region in Chicago, Illinois in 1893. Secretary of Agriculture J. Sterling Morton named Moore as chief of the U.S. Weather Bureau in 1895, succeeding Mark W. Harrington.

During this period, long range weather forecasting was considered little more than quackery, and Moore worked aggressively to denounce this activity. However, by 1906 he announced that the Weather Bureau was about to begin forecasting the weather a month in advance using scientific methods. The Bureau began experimenting with weekly forecasts in 1908, then made them a standard release in 1910. However, despite some successes, these would remain as inaccurate as the older methods.

Moore was subject to a Congressional investigation of alleged inappropriate spending on the Mount Weather research station in Virginia. His management style was heavily criticized by subordinates. House representative Theron Akin, an ardent foe of Moore, pushed for a House resolution to have Moore fired by the incoming Wilson administration. Moore submitted his resignation on April 5, and was dismissed by President Wilson on April 16, 1913. He was succeeded by Charles F. Marvin.

From 1905 to 1910, Moore was President of the National Geographic Society. Among other changes, he originated the practice of financing expeditions by the society. He was awarded an honorary LL.D. from Norwich University in 1896 and a D.Sc. from St. Lawrence University in 1906. Following his dismissal from government service, Moore became professor of applied meteorology at George Washington University. During his career, Moore was a frequent and popular speaker on meteorological topics and would published several works on meteorology.

== Personal life ==
Moore was married twice. He married his first wife, Mary Lozier, in 1884, but the couple separated in 1919 before filing for divorce in 1924, citing "nagging, scolding and holding up to ridicule" as grounds for the action. In December 1926, he married Doris G. Pilling of Petersboro, Ontario. At the time of their wedding, Moore was 71 and Pilling was 28. The couple were married in Buffalo, New York, but resided in Pasadena, California, where Moore had been living.

Moore died on December 18, 1927, in Pasadena at the age of 71 of heart disease.

== Bibliography ==
- Moore, Willis Luther (1899), Weather Forecasting; Some Facts Historical, Practical, and Theoretical, Weather Bureau.
- Moore, Willis Luther (1900), Moore's Meteorological Almanac and Weather Guide, Rand, McNally & Company.
- Moore, Willis Luther (1904), Climate: Its Physical Basis and Controlling Factors, Weather bureau.
- Moore, Willis Luther (1910), Descriptive Meteorology, New York: D. Appleton & Co..
- Moore, Willis Luther (1917), "The Beginning of the Weather Bureau", Records of the Columbia Historical Society, Washington, D.C., 20: 237–240, JSTOR 40067085.

Non-profit organization positions
Preceded by William John McGee	President of the National Geographic Society; 1905–1910	Succeeded by Henry Gannett
