= Shriners Hospitals for Children-Texas =

Shriners Children's Texas
- Shriners Children's
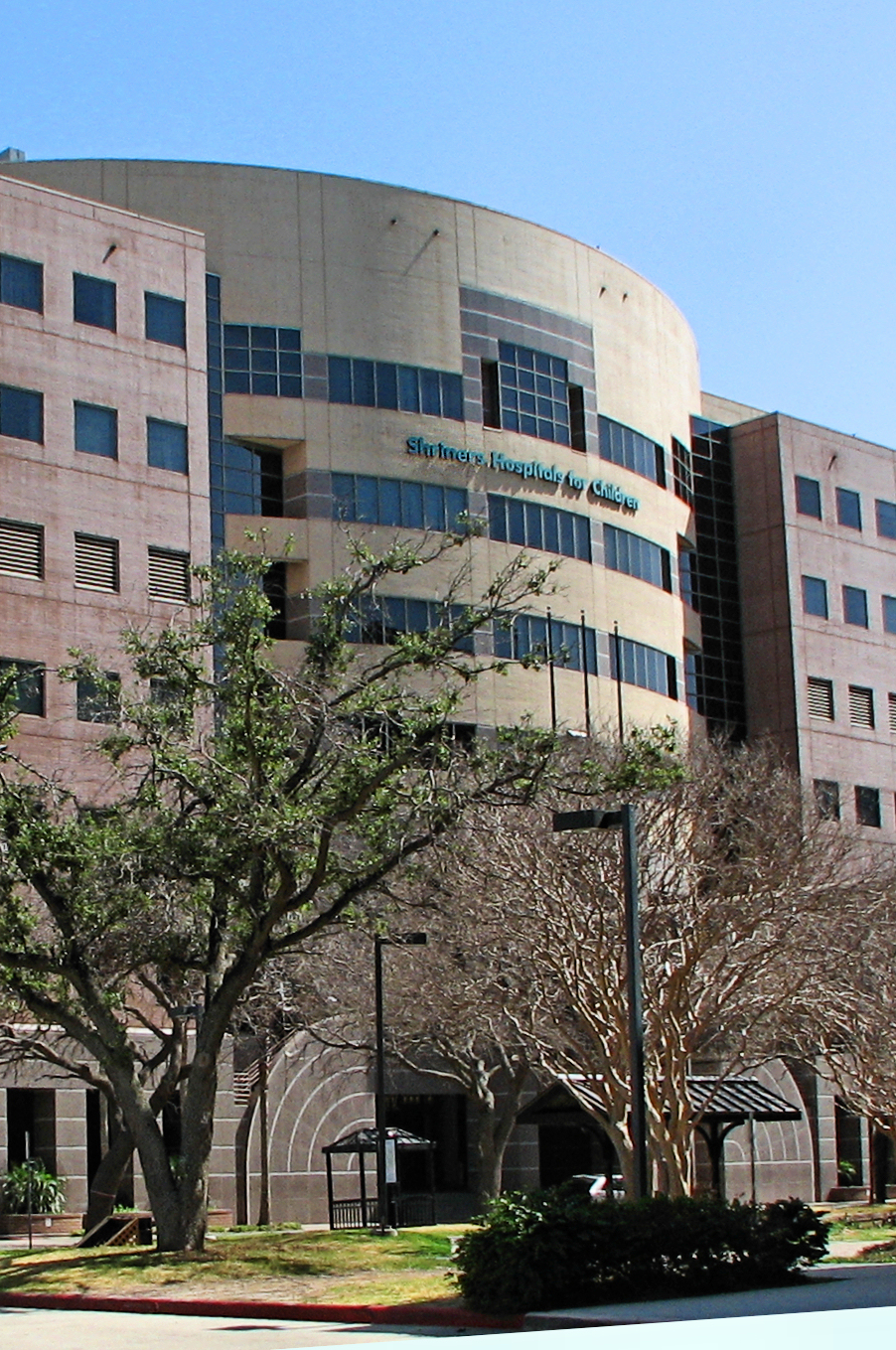

Geography
- Location: Galveston, Texas, United States
- Coordinates: 29°18′34″N 94°46′37″W

Organization
- Type: Specialist
- Affiliated university: University of Texas Medical Branch

Services
- Beds: 30
- Speciality: Pediatric burn care, Pediatric orthopedic care, Pediatric cleft lip

History
- Founded: 1966

Links
- Website: Shriners Hospital for Children - Texas
- Lists: Hospitals in Texas

The Shriners Children's Texas is a 30-bed non-profit pediatric specialty hospital (orthopedic, burn, and other service lines), research, and teaching center located adjacent to the University of Texas Medical Branch in Galveston, Texas, US. Part of a 22-hospital system, it is one of the two Shriner's Hospitals Centers of Excellence and consists of an intensive care unit with 15 acute beds and a med/surg unit with 15 beds along with three operating rooms. The hospital is verified as a burn center by the American Burn Association and accredited by the Joint Commission on Accreditation of Healthcare Organizations. In 2012, the hospital joined the Texas Medical Center as its 50th member institution.

== History ==
In 1962 the Shriners of North America allocated $10 million to establish three hospitals that specialized in the treatment and rehabilitation of burned children. After visiting 21 university-based medical institutions, the decision was made to build the first pediatric burn unit on the campus of the University of Texas Medical Branch at Galveston (UTMB). In 1963 the "Shriners Burns Institute" began operation in a seven-bed ward in John Sealy Hospital, the teaching hospital for UTMB. In the interim, a specialized Shriner's Burns Hospital was being constructed on land adjacent to the university, that had been donated by the Sealy & Smith Foundation. Work on the hospital was completed in 1966 and the institute moved in shortly after.

By the late 1980s the Shriners began to study the possibility of replacing the aging 1966 hospital. Since their orthopedic children's hospital in nearby Houston was also slated to be replaced, the organization studied combining the two institutions and basing them in the Texas Medical Center. However the Sealy & Smith Foundation and the Moody Foundation both offered substantial financial and logistical support to the organization if it would choose to stay in Galveston. With Galveston foundations willing to cover much of the cost of a new hospital, the Shriners agreed to remain in the island city and renewed their agreement with UTMB. In 1989 construction commenced on a new eight-story hospital tower that would be equipped with 30 beds, three operating rooms, a 163-seat auditorium, research & rehabilitation facilities and a skywalk directly linking the hospital with UTMB's John Sealy and Children's hospitals. The new hospital was completed and occupied in 1992, followed by Sealy Smith Foundation purchasing the 1966 hospital and donating it to UTMB for use as a research facility.

== Hurricane Ike ==
The hospital was damaged by Hurricane Ike in September 2008. In light of the cost of repairs and the economic downturn, the Shriner's National Hospital Board planned to mothball the facility in the aftermath of the storm, however the Shriners National Convention overturned the decision and voted to repair and reopen the Galveston facility. Prior to the storm, the hospital serviced both burns patients and patients with cleft lip and palate disorders. However, when the Galveston hospital reopened in 2009, the decision was made to relocate the cleft lip program to the hospital's sister institution, the Shriners Orthopaedic Hospital for Children in Houston.

== Merger ==
In January 2020 it was announced that Shriners Hospital for Children in Houston would be closing their facility and transferring staff and programs to their sister hospital, Shriners Hospital for Burned Children, in Galveston. The merger was expected to be completed by the 4th Quarter of 2020 with the closing of the Houston Hospital occurring in early 2021. After the merger the Shriners Hospital for Burned Children -- Galveston would be renamed Shriners Children's Texas, to reflect the expanded programs and services.

== See also ==
- Shriners Hospitals for Children
- List of Texas Medical Center institutions
- List of hospitals in Texas
