= List of Texas Medical Center institutions =

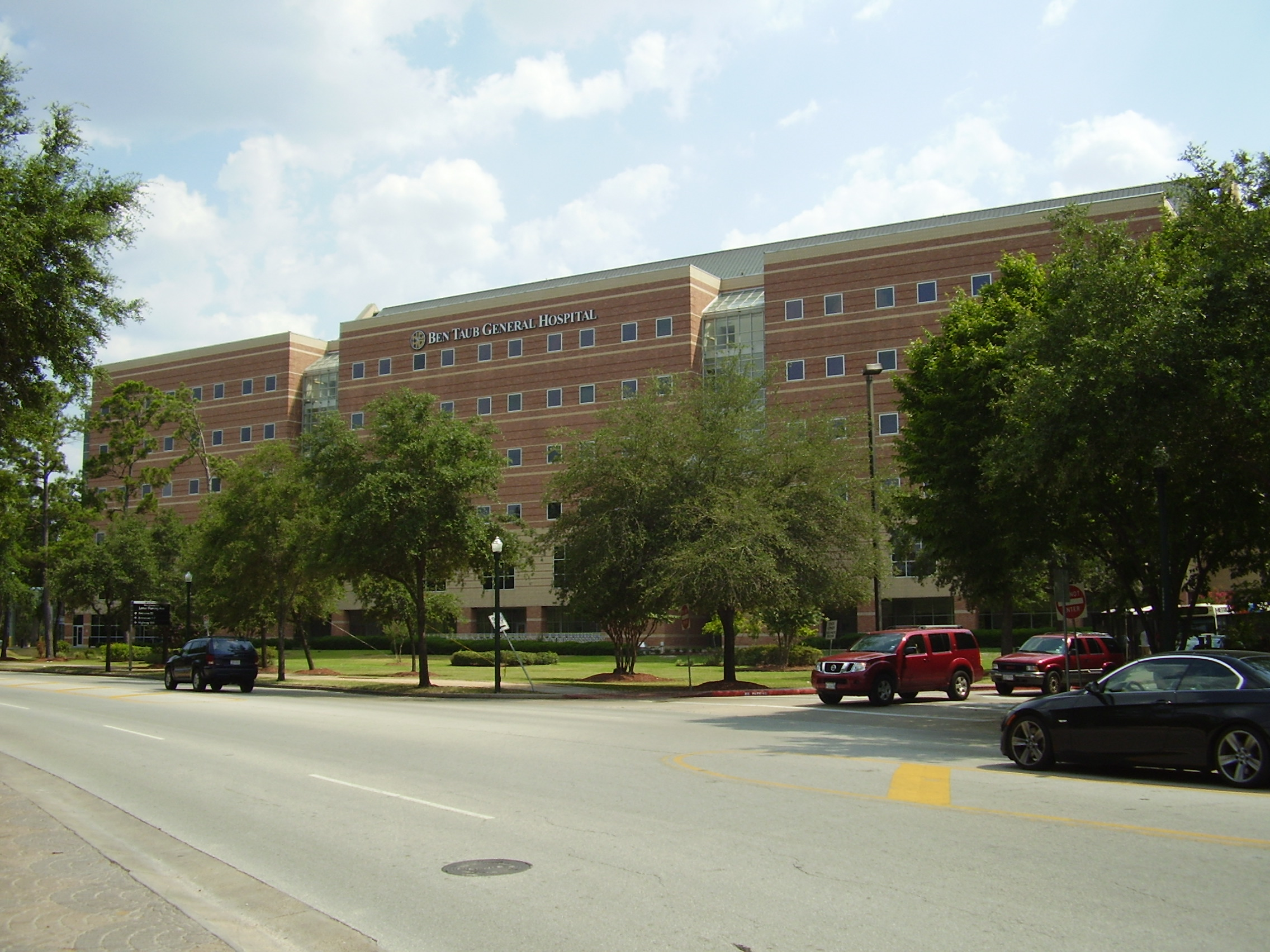
Ben Taub General Hospital

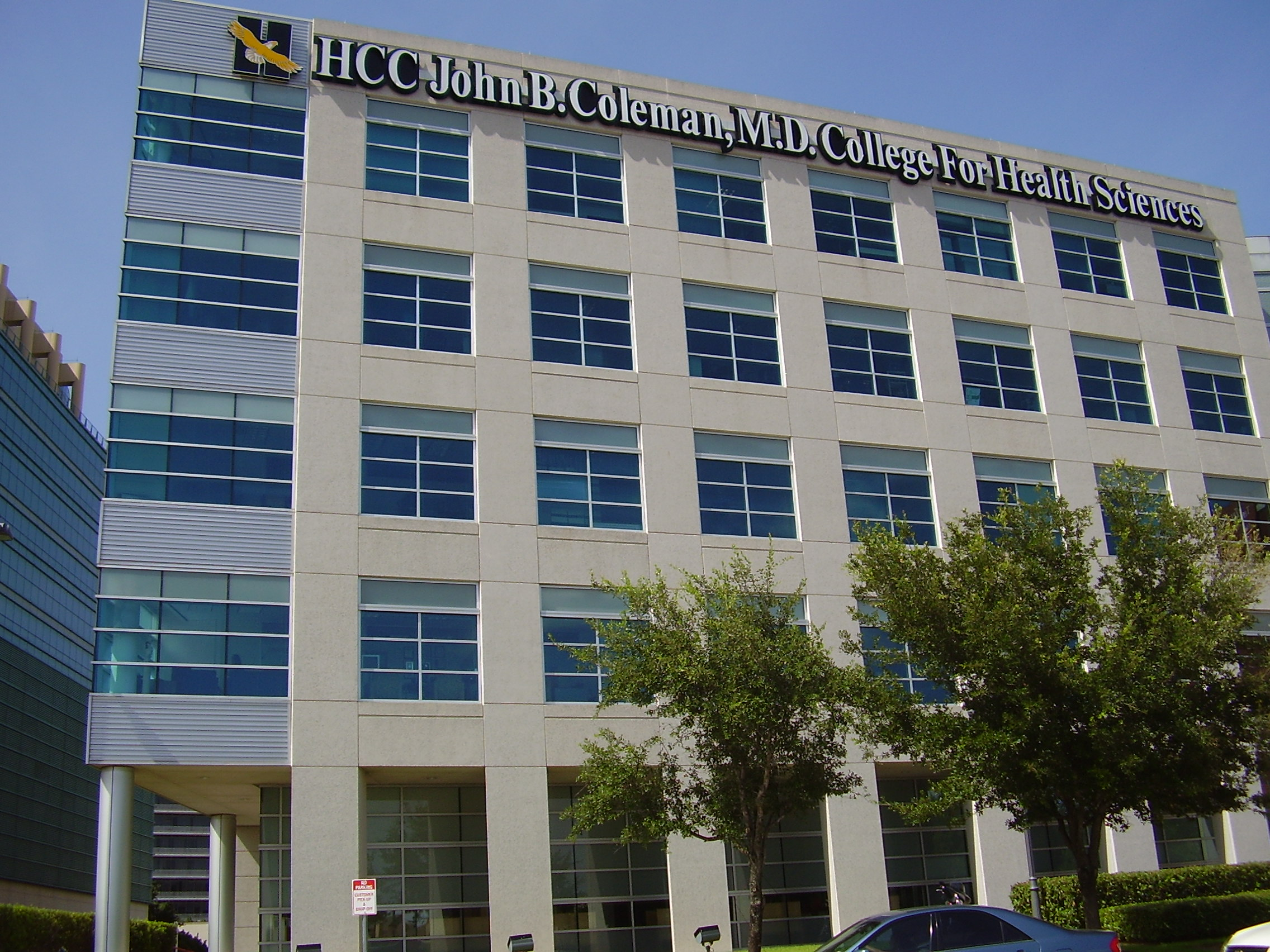
Houston Community College Coleman College for Health Sciences

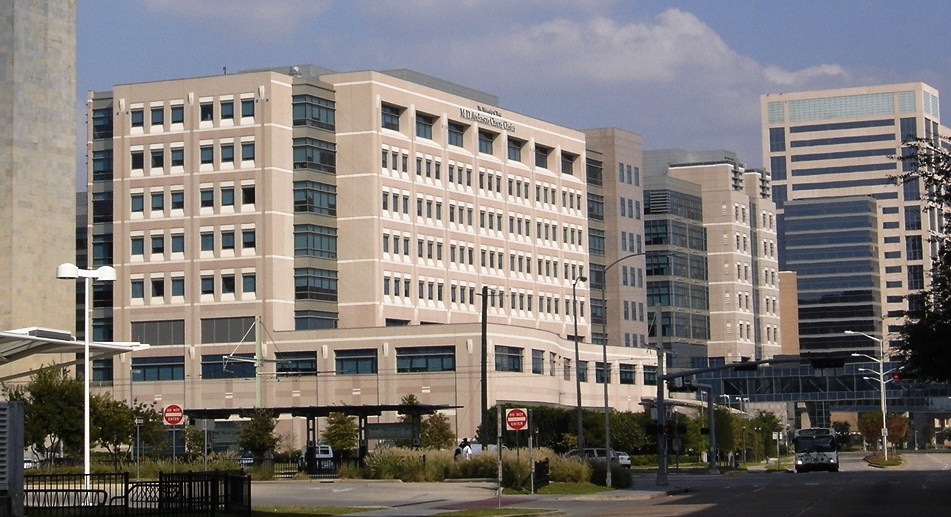
M.D. Anderson Cancer Center

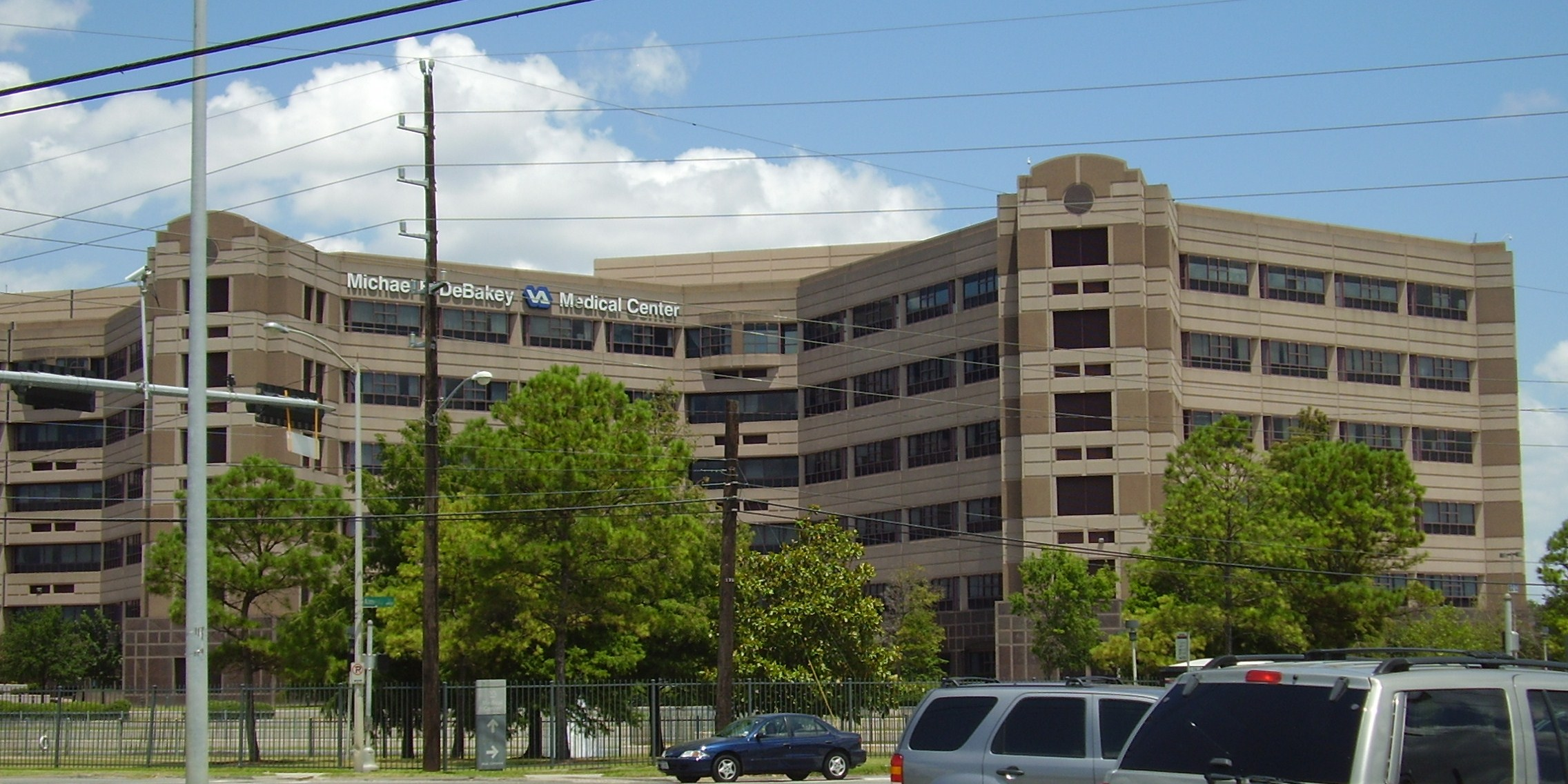
Michael E. DeBakey Veterans Affairs Medical Center in Houston

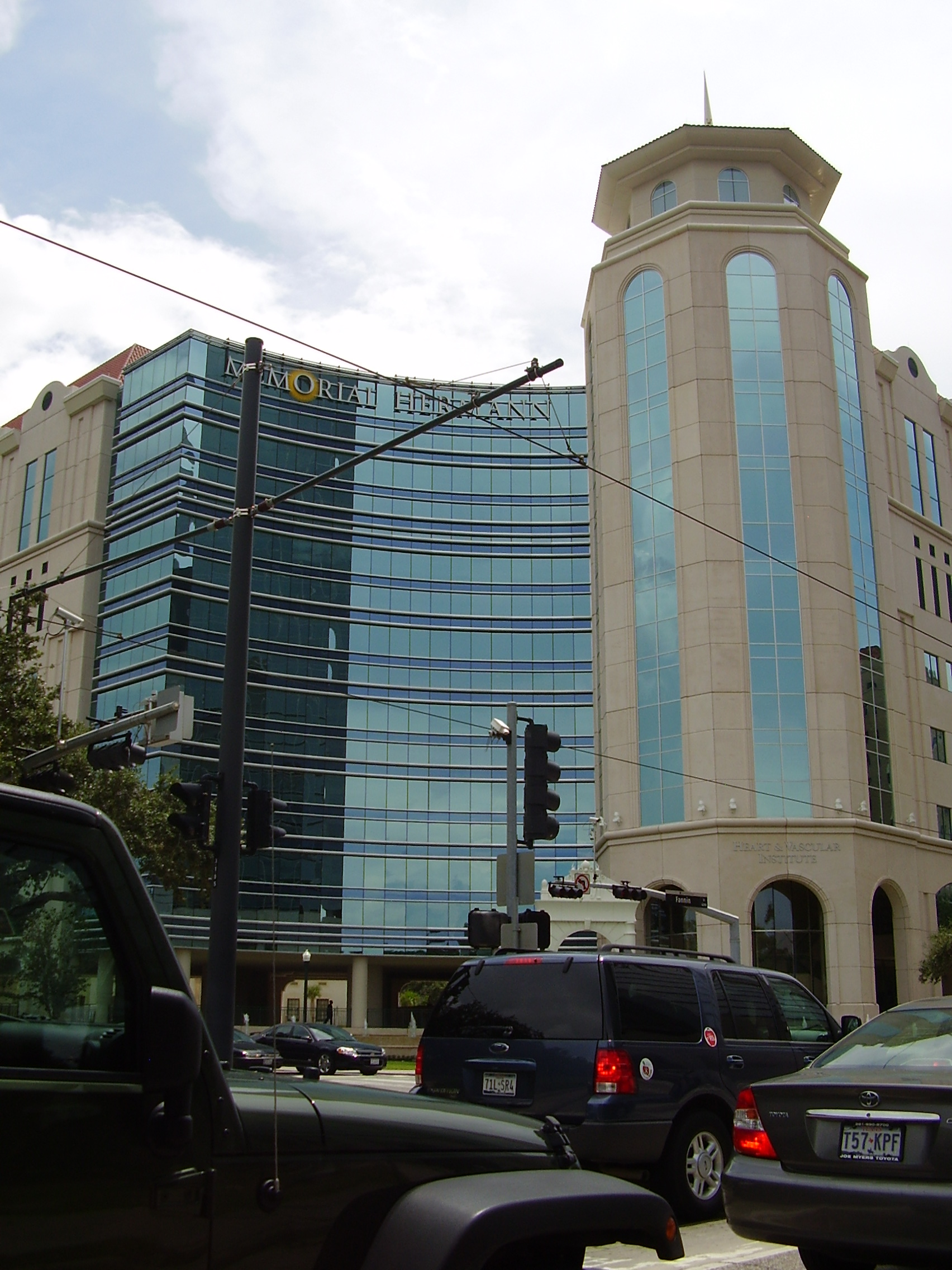
Memorial Hermann Hospital

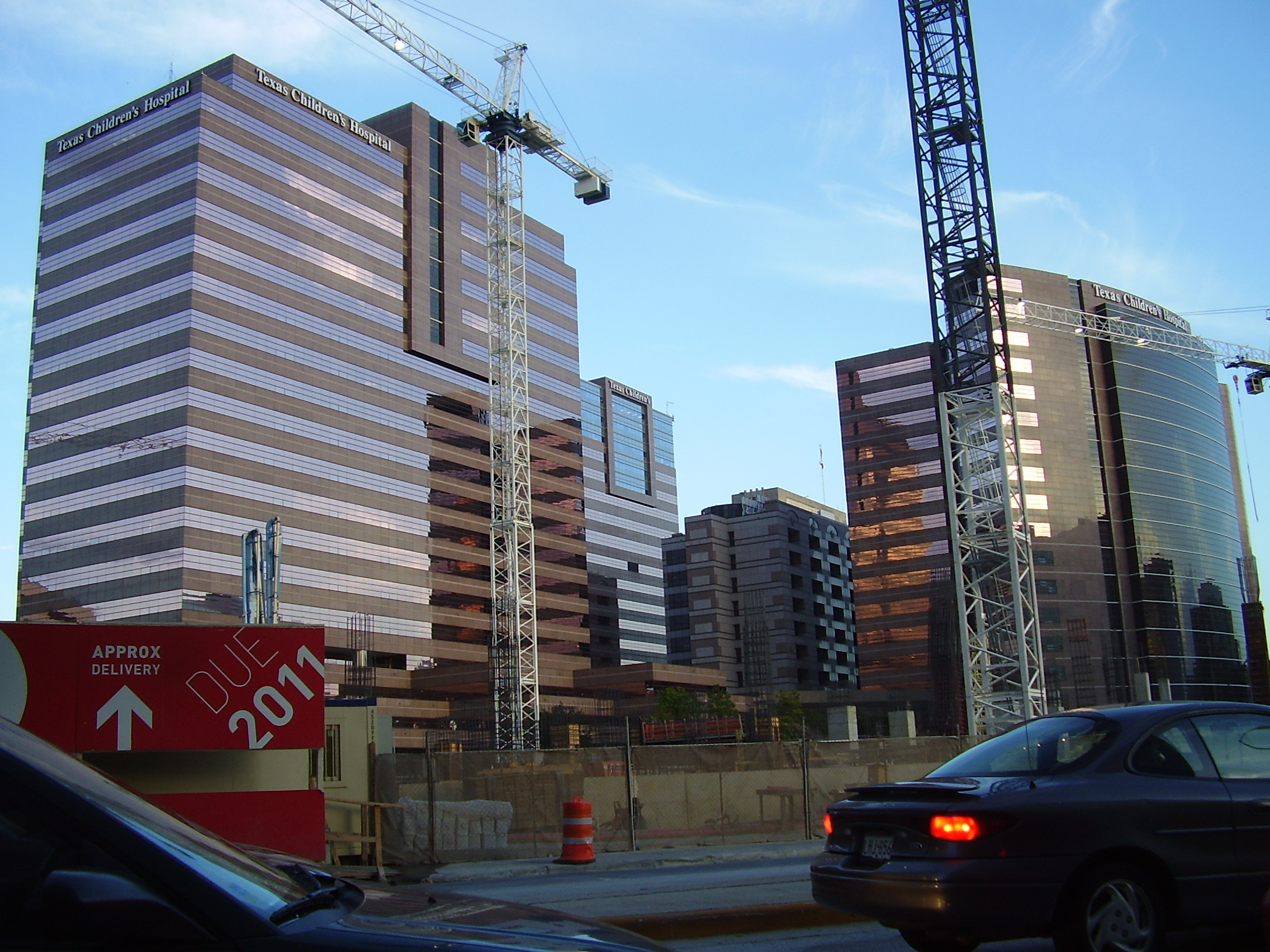
Texas Children's Hospital

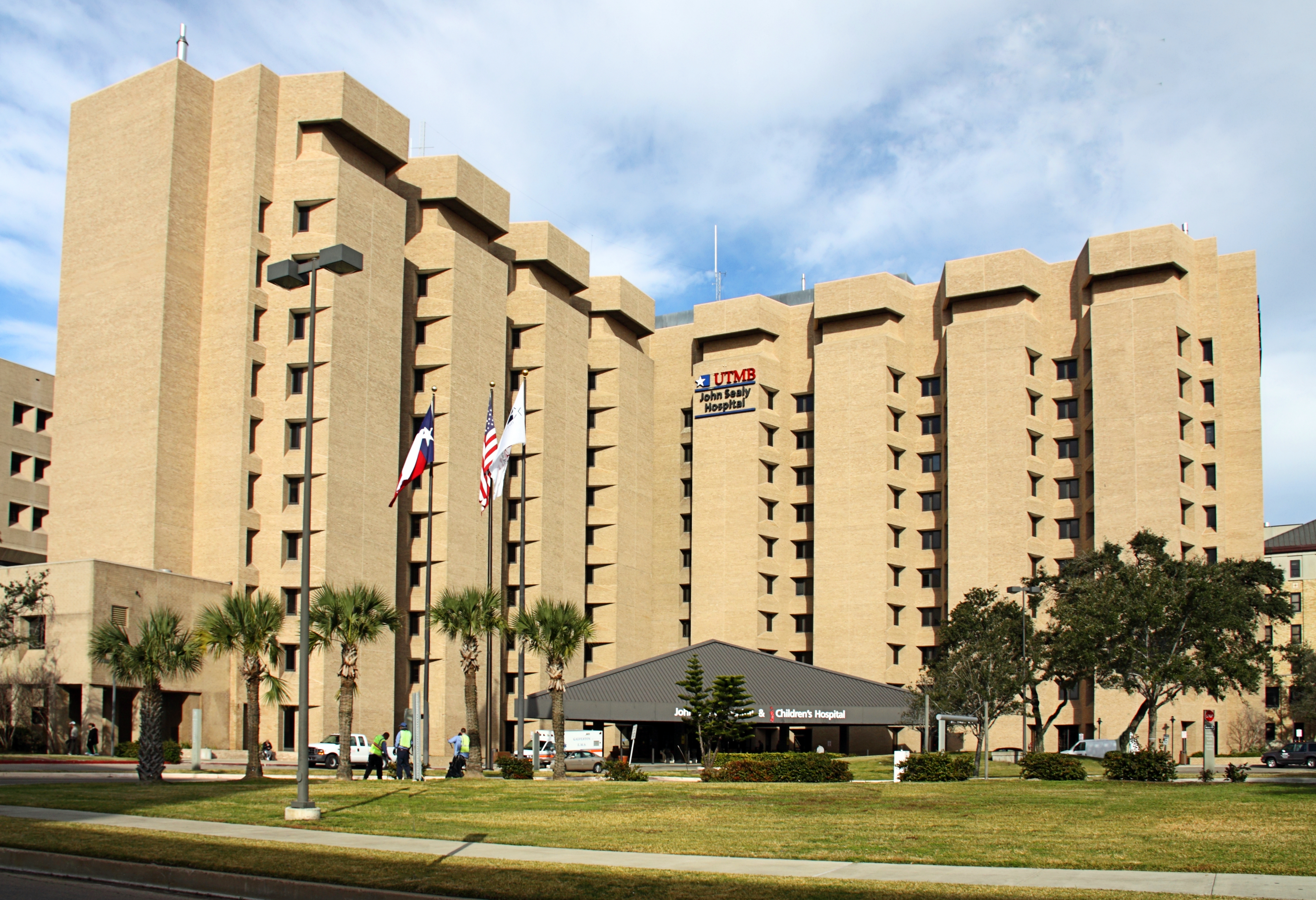
John Sealy Hospital at UTMB-Galveston

This is a list of institutions of the Texas Medical Center.

== Patient care institutions ==
- Baylor St. Luke's Medical Center, affiliated with and partially owned by Baylor College of Medicine.
- Ben Taub General Hospital, part of the Harris Health System, Level 1 trauma hospital affiliated with Baylor College of Medicine (BCM)
- Houston Methodist Hospital, affiliated with Texas A&M Health Science Center College of Medicine and Weill Cornell Medical College
- John Sealy Hospital, Level 1 trauma center affiliated with UTMB at Galveston
- Memorial Hermann-Texas Medical Center, Level 1 trauma center affiliated with McGovern Medical School (formerly UTHealth Medical School)
- Children's Memorial Hermann Hospital
- Michael E. DeBakey Veterans Affairs Medical Center in Houston, affiliated with BCM
- Rebecca Sealy Hospital, part of the University of Texas Medical Branch at Galveston.
- Shriner's Hospital for Children — Galveston, burn care unit
- Shriners Hospitals for Children — Houston
- Texas Children's Hospital, affiliated with BCM
- TIRR Memorial Hermann, affiliated with BCM and McGovern Medical School
- The University of Texas M. D. Anderson Cancer Center, affiliated with BCM, McGovern Medical School, UTMB Galveston, and Texas A&M Health Science Center

== Educational institutions ==
=== Academic and research institutions ===
- Baylor College of Medicine
- Houston Academy of Medicine-Texas Medical Center Library
- Houston Community College System — Health Science Programs
- Houston Methodist Hospital
  - Houston Methodist Research Institute
  - Houston Methodist DeBakey Heart Center
  - Methodist Neurological Institute
  - Center for Cell and Gene Therapy
- Prairie View A&M College of Nursing
- Rice University-BioScience Research Collaborative
- Texas A&M Health Science Center Institute of Biosciences and Technology (IBT)
- Texas Children's Hospital
  - Texas Children's Cancer Center
- Texas Heart Institute
- Texas Woman's University Institute of Health Sciences, Houston
- University of Texas Health Science Center at Houston
- University of Texas M. D. Anderson Cancer Center
- University of Texas Medical Branch at Galveston
  - Galveston National Laboratory

=== Secondary schools ===
- Michael E. DeBakey High School for Health Professions — named after Michael E. DeBakey

== Support facilities ==
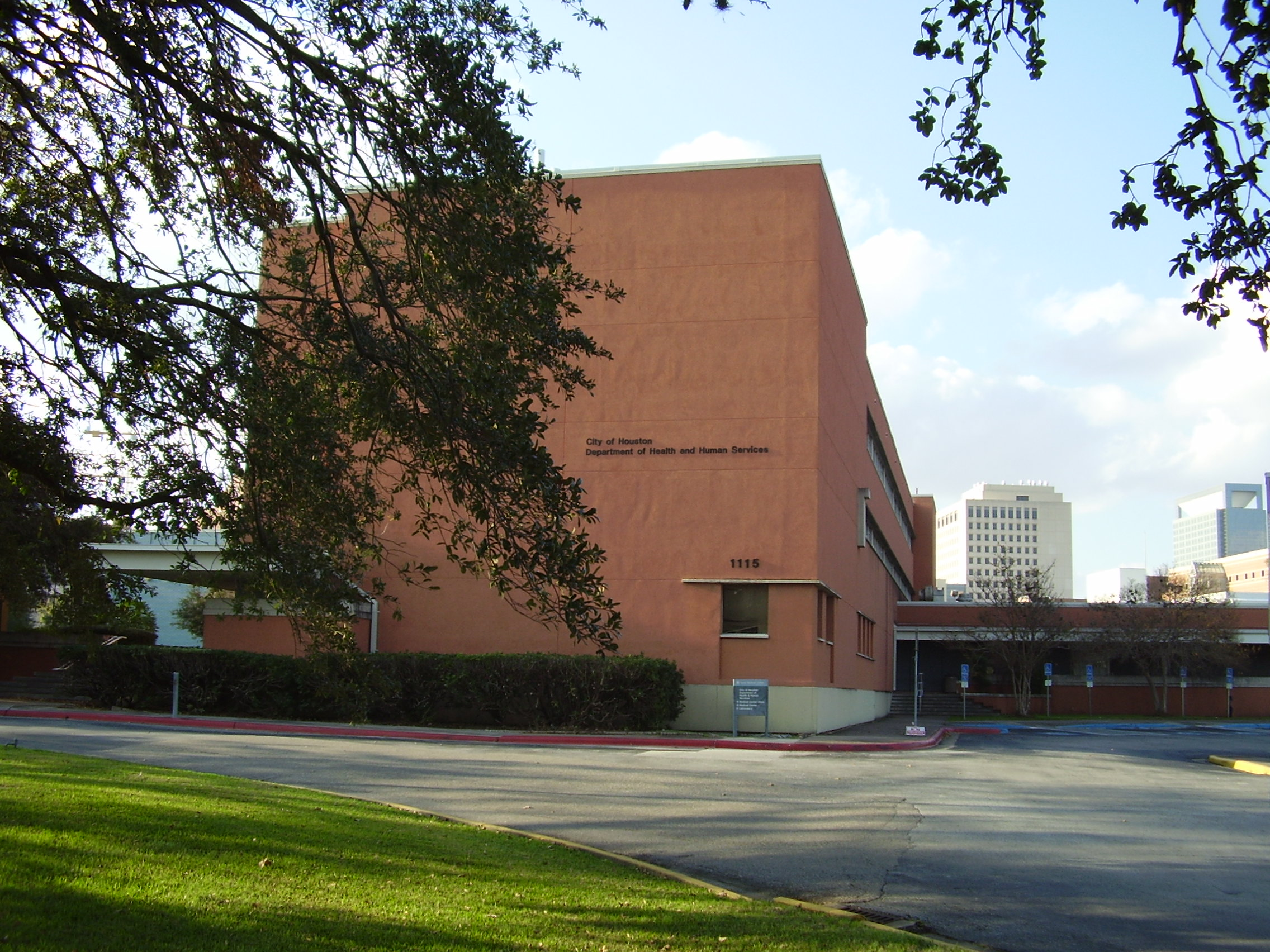
Office of the City of Houston Health and Human Services, located in the Texas Medical Center

- Gulf Coast Regional Blood Center
- John P. McGovern Museum of Health and Medical Science
- Ronald McDonald House of Houston
- Ronald McDonald House of Galveston
- YMCA Child Care Center in the Texas Medical Center
- The Menninger Clinic
- DePelchin Children's Center
- Sabin Vaccine Institute
