= Cheri L. Canon =

American radiologist

Cheri L. Canon, M.D., FACR, FSAR, FAAWR
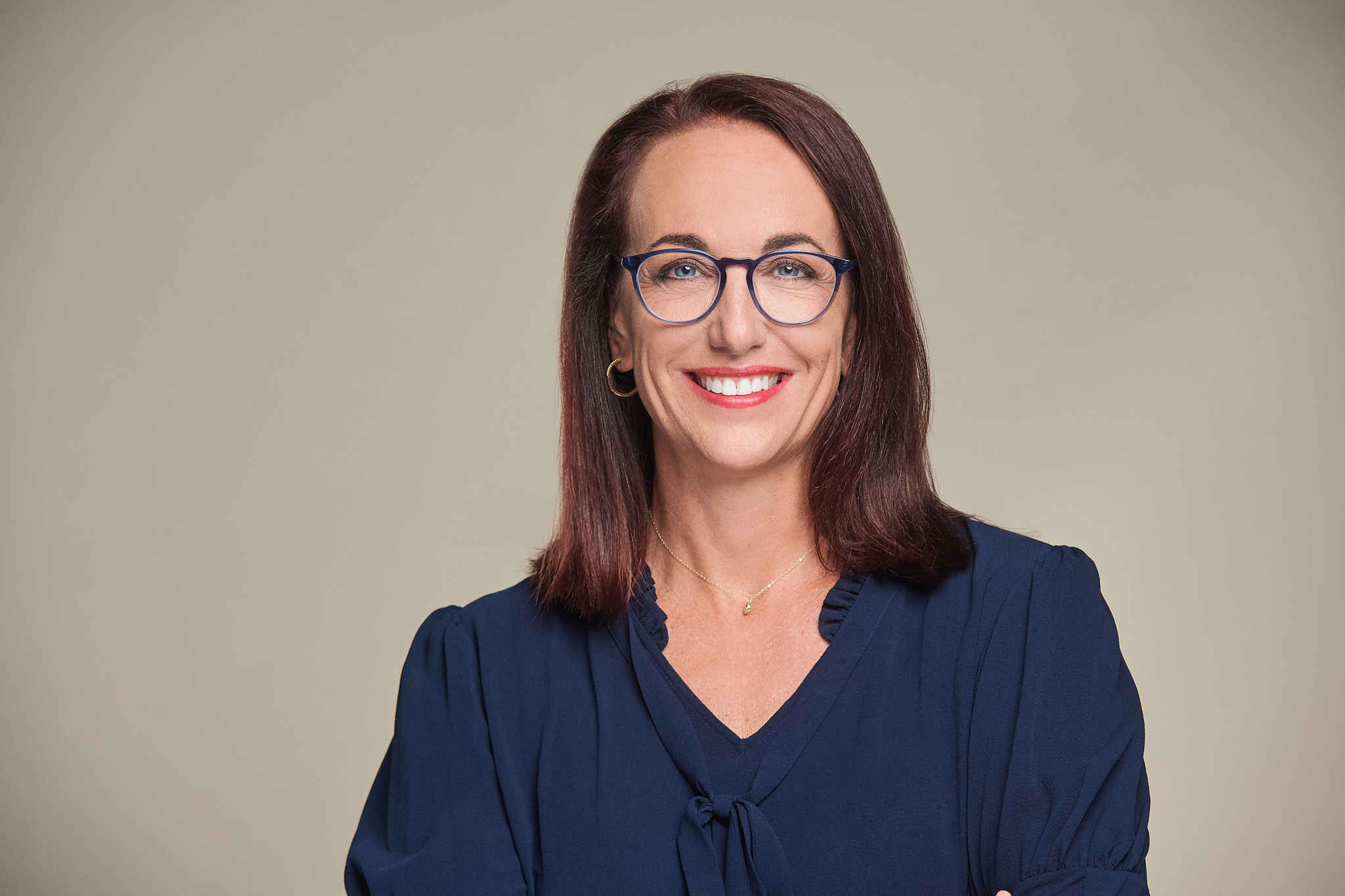
- Occupations: Professor and Witten-Stanley Endowed Chair of the Department of Radiology at the UAB Heersink School of Medicine
- Website: https://providerdirectory.uabmedicine.org/provider/cheri-canon/572735

Cheri L. Canon, M.D., FACR, FSAR, FAAWR, is an American abdominal radiologist at the University of Alabama at Birmingham School of Medicine Department of Radiology. She currently serves as president of University of Alabama Health Services Foundation (UAHSF), chief physician executive of the UAB Health System, and is a professor emerita for the UAB Department of Radiology.

== Education ==
Canon completed her undergraduate training at the University of Texas at Austin, obtaining a Bachelor of Science in zoology. Afterward, she attended medical school at the University of Texas Medical Branch in Galveston, Texa. After graduating medical school with honors, she completed a diagnostic radiology residency at UAB, where she joined the faculty in the Abdominal Imaging Section in 1998. She sits on the UAB Medicine Joint Operating Leadership Council and is a trustee on the UAHSF board.

== Career ==
Canon served as a professor in the UAB Heersink School of Medicine after joining the faculty in the Department of Radiology in 1998. She served as the school’s Curriculum Committee chair when an organ-based curriculum was implemented in 2001. From 2003 to 2008, she was the radiology residency program director, in addition to serving as the vice-chair of education from 2004 to 2008.

From 2008 to 2011, Canon was the division director of diagnostic radiology (2008–2011) and senior vice chair of operations (2009–2011) before being appointed interim chair of radiology in 2010 and the Witten-Stanley Endowed Chair of Radiology in 2011, a position she held until 2024. Canon was selected as the next president of the UAHSF and chief physician executive (CPE) of UAB Health System, becoming UAHSF president-elect and UAB Health System CPE-elect on Jan. 1, 2024. She formally transitioned into the roles on May 1, 2024. She was also chosen to be part of the UAB Healthcare Leadership Academy inaugural class.

Canon served as an oral examiner for the American Board of Radiology (ABR) for 11 years, a member of the Board of Trustees, and now sits on its Board of Governors as the president-elect. She was vice president of the American College of Radiology (ACR), chancellor on the board, and chair of the ACR Commission on Education. As a member of the inaugural ACR Radiology Leadership Institute board, she helped launch a comprehensive leadership development program in partnership with the most recognized business schools. She is a fellow of the college and received the ACR Gold Medal in 2021, its highest honor. She received the Alabama Academy of Radiology’s Silver Medal in spring 2022. Canon is a past president of the Society of Chairs of Academic Radiology Departments (SCARD) and the co-creator and co-director of LEAD, a women’s leadership development program jointly developed by SCARD and GE Healthcare.

Canon previously served in leadership – including as president and on the executive board – for Momentum, a Birmingham women’s leadership organization. In recognition of her advocacy for women, she was recognized with the American Association of Women in Radiology Marie Sklodowska-Curie Award in 2020. In 2022, Canon was recognized by the University of Texas Medical Branch John Sealy School of Medicine Alumni Association’s highest honor, the Ashbel Smith Distinguished Alumni Award.

== Research ==
Canon’s research interests include diseases of the esophagus and imaging of postoperative patients. Additional areas of interest include resident education, diversity and inclusion, and leadership development. In addition to her peer-reviewed publications, her editorial experience includes one book contribution, multiple book chapters, and four leadership webinars with the American College of Radiology Leadership Institute. Furthermore, Canon has served as an editorial reviewer for multiple peer-reviewed journals, including the American Journal of Roentgenology, World Journal of Gastrointestinal Endoscopy, and Journal of the American College of Radiology. In addition to her multiple publications, she has also given over 170 presentations at different events.

== Awards and honors ==
- Semifinalist – Aunt Minnie – Most Effective Radiology Educator: 2012, 2015
- Medical Technology Schools 25 Top Radiology Professors: 2015
- Recognition of Exceptional Manuscript Review for 2014, JACR: 2014
- American Board of Radiology Lifetime Service Award: 2013
- American Board of Radiology Distinguished Service Award: 2012
- UAB Argus Award: Best Guest Lecturer Nominee: 2002, 2003, 2005, 2007-2010
- UAB Department of Radiology Top 10 Teaching Award: 2009, 2010
- YWCA Momentum Women's Leadership Program, selected for 5th class: 2006
- Herbert M. Stauffer Award for Best Education Paper for 2005: 2006
- UAB President’s Award for Excellence in Teaching: 2002
