= Marie Charlotte Schaefer =

Texas physician and medical school faculty member (1874–1927)

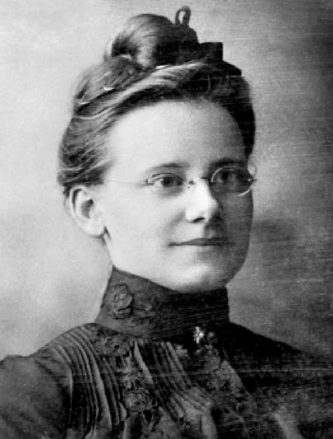
Dr. Marie Charlotte Schaefer of UTMB in 1912.

Marie Charlotte Schaefer (June 24, 1874 – May 27, 1927) was an early Texas physician and the first woman to become a faculty member of the University of Texas Medical Branch (UTMB).

== Biography ==
Schaefer was born in San Antonio, Texas and attended San Antonio High School where she graduated as the salutatorian in 1893. After high school, she taught for a year and then enrolled in the University of Texas Medical Branch (UTMB) in 1895. She earned her medical degree in 1900 and then did a year-long residency in pathology at the John Sealy Hospital. At the hospital, she worked on the pathology of hookworms.

In 1901, she became the first woman faculty member of UTMB. She gave the opening speech on the first day of school at UTMB in 1912. In 1915, she became a full professor of embryology and ten years later in 1925, a full professor of histology. On May 27, 1927 she suffered from a sudden illness due to heart disease and died the same day. Schaefer was buried in San Antonio and former students of hers served as pallbearers. Schaefer's medical drawings are in the collection of the UTMB Moody Medical Library.
