= Shriners Hospital for Children (Houston) =

- Shriners Hospitals for Children
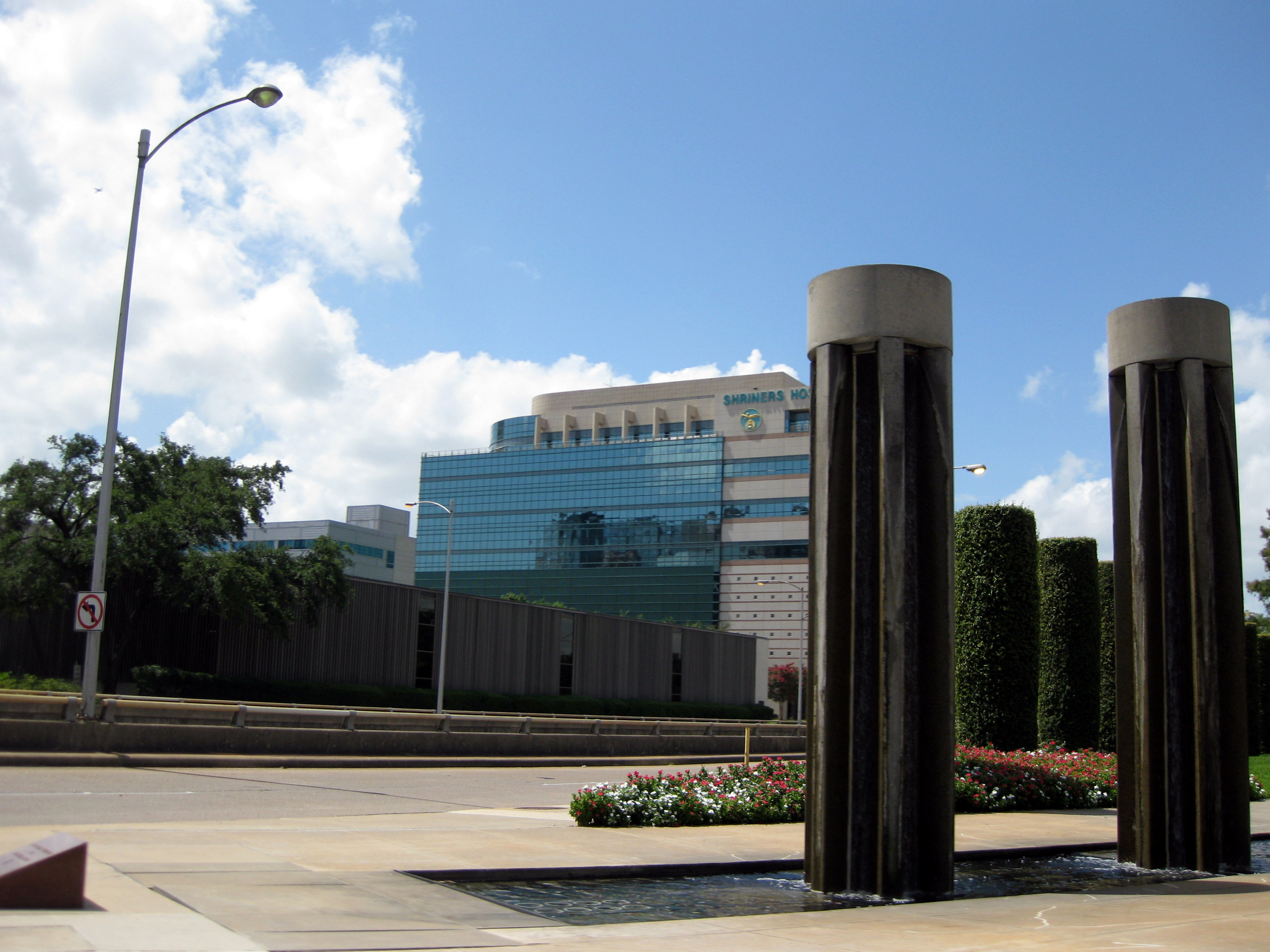

Geography
- Location: Houston, Texas, United States
- Coordinates: 29°42′16″N 95°24′20″W

Organization
- Type: Specialist
- Affiliated university: University of Texas Medical Branch

Services
- Standards: Joint Commission
- Beds: 40
- Speciality: Pediatric orthopaedics

History
- Founded: 1952
- Closed: 2021

Links
- Website: Shriners Hospital - Texas
- Lists: Hospitals in Texas

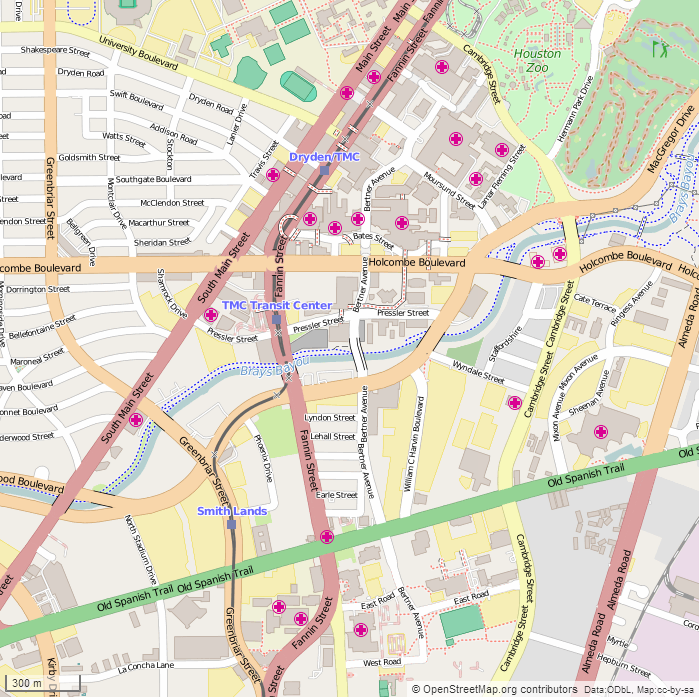
Location within Texas Medical Center

The Shriners Hospital for Children (Houston) was a non-profit, 40-bed pediatric orthopedic hospital, research and teaching center located in the Texas Medical Center in Houston, Texas, United States. At the time it was one of 22 hospitals belonging to the Shriners Hospital for Children Network. Faculty worked closely with the Baylor College of Medicine, Scott and White Hospital, and the University of Texas Health Science Center at Houston. The hospital was accredited by the Joint Commission on Accreditation of Healthcare Organizations.

== Hurricane Ike ==
Prior to Hurricane Ike in 2008, the cleft lip and palate program had been based at the institution's sister hospital, Shriners Hospital for Burned Children in nearby Galveston. The storm briefly closed the Galveston hospital, and in the interim, both burn and cleft lip patients were seen at the Houston orthopedic hospital. When the Galveston hospital reopened in 2009, the decision was made to keep the cleft lip program in Houston.

== Closing ==
In January 2020 it was announced that Shriners Hospital for Children in Houston would be closing their facility and transferring staff and programs to their sister hospital, Shriners Hospital for Burned Children, in Galveston. The merger was expected to be completed by the 4th Quarter of 2020 with the closing of the Houston Hospital occurring in early 2021. After the merger the Shriners Hospital for Burned Children -- Galveston would be renamed Shriners Hospitals for Children - Texas, to reflect the expanded programs and services.

== See also ==
- Shriners Hospitals for Children
- List of Texas Medical Center institutions
- List of hospitals in Texas
