= Rebecca Sealy Hospital =

- University of Texas Medical Branch

Geography
- Location: Galveston, Texas, United States
- Coordinates: 29.30980°N 94.77550°W

Organization
- Care system: Public
- Type: Research, day surgery, and psychiatric facility
- Affiliated university: University of Texas Medical Branch

Services
- Beds: 20 (Psychiatric Unit)

History
- Opened: 1866; 159 years ago (as St. Mary's Hospital); 1996; 29 years ago (purchased by the Sealy & Smith Foundation)
- Closed: 2008; 17 years ago

Links
- Website: utmbhealthcare.org
- Lists: Hospitals in Texas

Rebecca Sealy Hospital was an eight-story hospital, and one of five hospitals on the campus of the University of Texas Medical Branch (UTMB) in Galveston, Texas, United States. It was founded in 1866 as St. Mary's Hospital, a private, Catholic, general hospital, but was purchased in 1996 by the Sealy & Smith Foundation. The foundation renamed it and donated it to the university for use as a psychiatric, outpatient surgery, and research hospital.

== Hurricane Ike ==
In 2008, severe flooding from Hurricane Ike damaged all UTMB facilities, including Rebecca Sealy Hospital. The inpatient psychiatric unit closed and the building was renovated into offices and simulation labs.

== See also ==
- John Sealy Hospital
- List of Texas Medical Center institutions
- List of hospitals in Texas
