= James Edwin Thompson =

English born American surgeon (1863–1927)

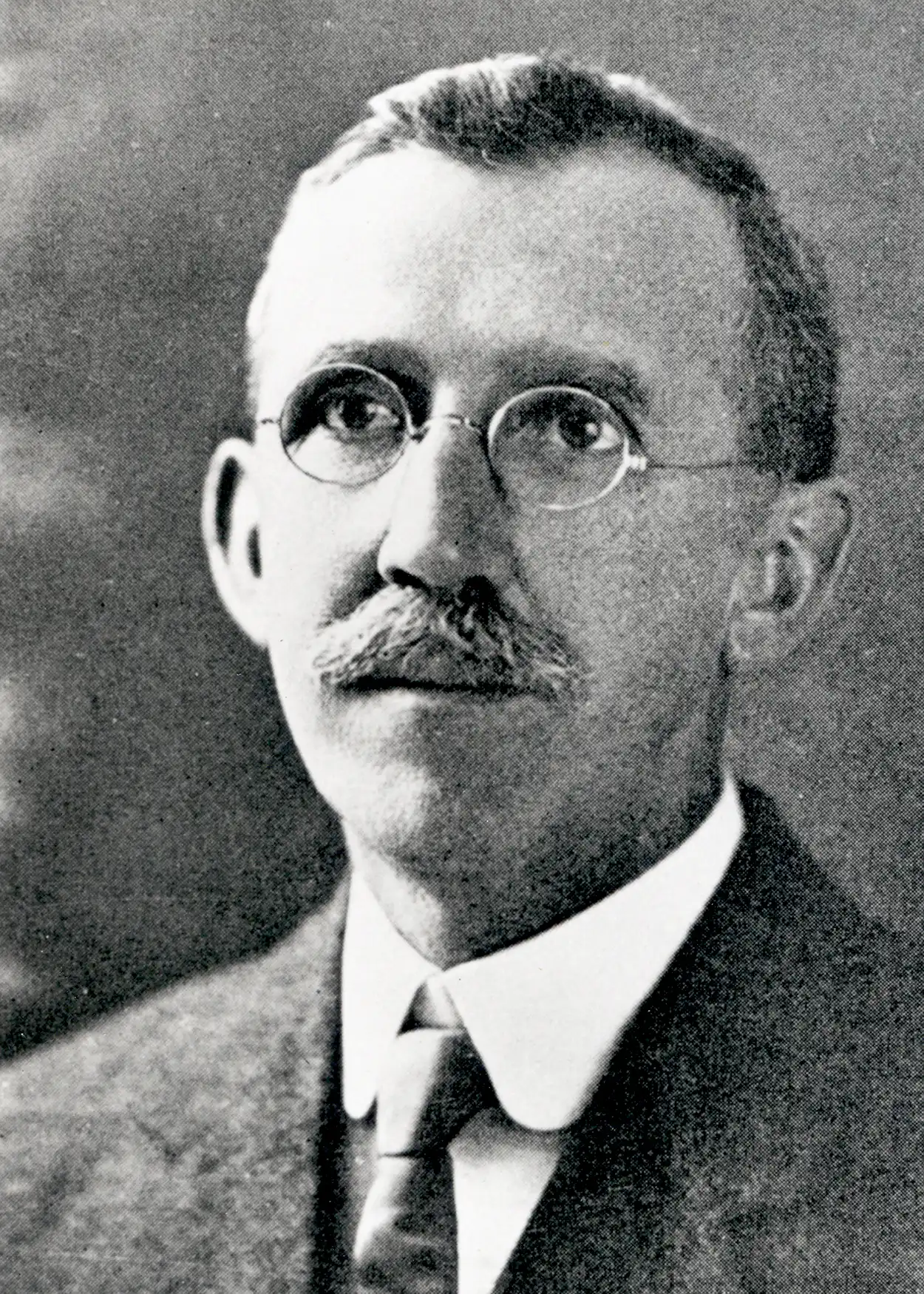
- Born: May 21, 1863; Norwich, England
- Died: April 9, 1927 (aged 63); Galveston, Texas, US
- Occupation: Surgeon
- Spouse: Eleanor Waters Roeck
- Children: 8

James Edwin Thompson (May 21, 1863 – April 9, 1927) was an English-born surgeon who spent much of his life in the United States. He was the first vice-president and a founding member of the American College of Surgeons. He served as the inaugural chairman for the Department of Surgery at the University of Texas Medical Branch in Galveston, Texas.

== Early life and education ==
Thompson was born May 21, 1863, in Norwich, England, to John and Mary (née Molyneux) Thompson.

Thompson attended the Witton Grammar School, Owens College (receiving the Bradley and Dumville Scholarships), Manchester School of Medicine, and University of London, receiving bachelor's degree in medicine and surgery from the latter. He also received an honorary degree from Baylor University in 1925. During his studies, between 1886 and 1887, he was President of the Medical Students' Debating Society.

== Career ==
Thompson became a member of the Royal College of Surgeons on the 23rd of July, 1886, and a fellow on the 13th of June, 1889.

Thompson moved to Galveston, Texas, in 1891 and served as the University of Texas Medical Branch's inaugural Chairman of Surgery, holding the position until his death in 1927. He worked as a surgeon at John Sealy Hospital.

Thompson aided in founding the American College of Surgeons and became the organization's first vice president in 1913. Two years later, he helped found the Texas Surgical Society. He served as president for the Texas Surgical Society (1915–1916) and Southern Surgical Association (1919), as well as the American Surgical Association's first vice president (1922). He is also credited with bringing modern surgery to Texas

He published over 75 publications on various surgical topics including Anal fistula, appendicitis, cleft palate, face and neck tumors, and hepatic cancer. His plastic surgery techniques for cleft lip and palate were considered state of the art at the time.

== Selected publications ==
- "Intestinal Obstruction due to Meckel's Diverticulum."
- "Conservatism in the Treatment of Tubercular Joint Disease."
- "Anatomical Routes of Approach to the Long Bones of the Extremities."
- "The Simplification of Technique in Operations for Hare-Lip and Cleft Palate"
- "An Anatomical and Experimental Study of Sacral Anæsthesia"

== Personal life ==
Thompson was married to Eleanor Waters Roeck on May 16, 1896 and together they had eight children: four daughters and four sons. All four of his sons became doctors.

Thompson died in Galveston, Texas, on April 9, 1927.
