= Sisters of Charity of the Incarnate Word =

Roman Catholic institutions

The Congregation of the Sisters of Charity of the Incarnate Word (Latin: Congregatio Caritatis Verbi Incarnati). is the name of two related Catholic religious institutes based in Texas. They use the abbreviation C.C.V.I.

== History ==
=== Houston order ===
The Congregation of the Sisters of a Charity of the Incarnate Word, Houston is a religious institute of women begun in 1866, at the request of French-born Claude Marie Dubuis, the second Catholic bishop of the Diocese of Galveston, which then included the entire state of Texas. Texas was suffering from the ravages of the Civil War, coupled with the tragedy of a rapidly spreading cholera epidemic.

In 1866, Dubuis contacted his friend Angelique Hiver, Superioress of the Order of the Incarnate Word and Blessed Sacrament in Lyon, France. The Sisters could not fulfill his request since the order was cloistered and was committed to the ministry of education. Dubuis then applied for the admission of three young women who had volunteered. They were received into the monastery for the purpose of receiving formation and the rule of the Order, with the understanding that a new order was being formed. For a long time, the Lyon community continued to direct and support the Sisters of Charity of the Incarnate Word, as the new community came to be known.

Logo of the now-defunct St. Mary's Hospital, Galveston

Mary Blandine, Mary Joseph and Mary Ange arrived in Galveston, Texas, and started Charity Hospital, the first Catholic hospital in Texas. This would later become St. Mary's Infirmary and St. Mary's Hospital. Later, as a result of the yellow fever epidemic that struck Galveston, the St. Mary's Orphanage was started, first in the hospital, and was later moved just outside town, away from the epidemic. This epidemic also struck two of the sisters. Mary Blandine died of yellow fever on August 18, 1867; Mary Ange also contracted yellow fever, but recovered and returned to France. In 1867 and 1868, other sisters, educated and professed in the same convent at Lyon, came to offer their assistance.

Mary Joseph became superior, and continued the work in Galveston. In the early part of the 20th century, with the rapid growth of the City of Houston, the institute's headquarters were relocated from the Island city to Houston.

Today the sisters have missions in Ireland, Guatemala, El Salvador, Kenya and the United States. They are involved in ministries in health care (as part of Christus Health and Dignity Health), education, and social justice. They are also involved in fighting illiteracy and AIDS.

=== San Antonio order ===
The Sisters of Charity of the Incarnate Word, San Antonio is the largest group of religious women in Texas. The institute was founded in San Antonio in 1869, as a sister house of the Sisters of Charity of the Incarnate Word, Galveston, Texas. In 1869, Bishop Dubuis chose three from the Galveston community, Madeleine Chollet, Pierre Cinquin and Agnes Buisson to begin a new house in San Antonio and open the first hospital in the area. He named St. Madeleine superior of the new community. Three years later, he appointed St. Pierre Cinquin as her successor, and she remained in office until her death almost twenty years later. In 1870, Dubuis erected this new community as an independent centre, on the occasion of vesting the first postulants admitted into the San Antonio novitiate.

Madeleine Chollet, Pierre Cinquin and Agnes Buisson came to help the people of San Antonio who were being ravaged by a severe cholera epidemic. It was just after the Civil War and San Antonio had a population of 12,000; however, there were no public hospitals. When the three Sisters arrived, they founded the institute of the Sisters of Charity of the Incarnate Word. They also founded San Antonio's first public hospital, known today as Christus Santa Rosa Hospital.

Previous to 1874, the sisters had been solely occupied in caring for the sick, the aged, and orphans, but following the counsel of Anthony Dominic Pellicer, first bishop of San Antonio, they began to engage in educational work. In 1881, the Sisters founded the Incarnate Word Academy, which became Incarnate Word High School and University of the Incarnate Word.

In 1885 the Sisters opened a school in Saltillo, Mexico. By 1891 the Sisters had founded St. Joseph's Infirmary in Fort Worth, Texas. They also administered seven railroad hospitals scattered throughout Texas, Missouri, Iowa, and New Mexico. They are involved in ministries in health care (as part of Christus Health), education, care for the elderly and social justice.

The Village at Incarnate Word is a not-for-profit corporation, established by the Sisters of Charity of the Incarnate Word of San Antonio in 1988, to provide a retirement community for people of all faiths. The sisters work in United States, Mexico, Peru, and Zambia.

== Saint Mary's Orphanage and the Galveston Hurricane ==
The Galveston Hurricane of 1900 was one of the most destructive hurricanes ever to hit the United States. More than 6,000 people died, one-sixth the population of Galveston, Texas.

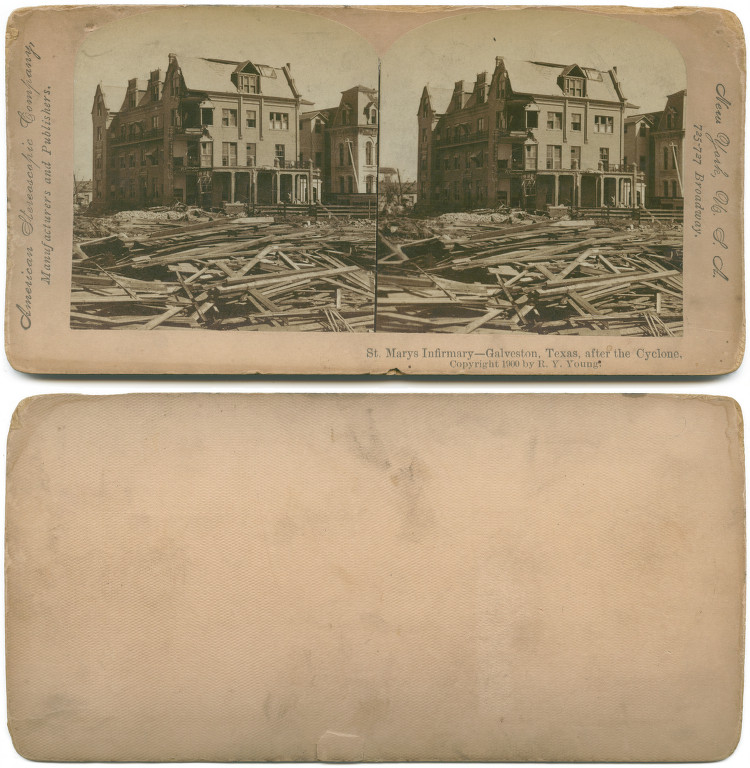
St. Mary's Infirmary in Galveston, Texas after the Cyclone, c. 1900

The Saint Mary's Orphan Asylum housed at that time 93 children (ages 2 to 13) and 10 sisters. The hurricane arrived quietly on September 7, 1900. The full force of the Galveston Hurricane of 1900 was not felt until the next day, September 8, and began to erode away the sand dunes that surrounded St. Mary's Orphanage. The sisters in charge decided to move the children into the girls' dormitory, as it was newer and stronger (and thus potentially safer) than the boys' dormitory.

The sisters led the children in singing (in English) the old French hymn, Queen of the Waves. Eventually, the boys' dormitory failed and collapsed into the sea. When the waters started to fill the first floor of the girl's dormitory, the sisters moved the children to the second floor, and again led in singing Queen of the Waves. The sisters put clothes line around their waists and connected themselves to six to eight children each in an attempt to save the children. Three of the children (older teen boys) were left loose.

Finally, the girls' dormitory collapsed. All ten sisters and ninety children perished; only the three teenage boys survived: William Murney, Frank Madera and Albert Campbell.

As a result of this tragedy, the Sisters of Charity of the Incarnate Word across the world sing Queen of the Waves every year, on September 8, and remember the sisters and the children that died in Galveston.

On September 8, 1994, a Texas historical marker was placed at 69th Street and Seawall Boulevard, marking the site of the former orphanage.

== See also ==
- Catholic sisters and nuns in the United States
- History of nursing in the United States
