= Sally Abston =

American physician and scientist

- Born: May 29, 1934
- Died: August 27, 2008 (aged 74)
- Education: Medical degree (UTMB)
- Occupation: Surgeon
- Known for: Burn surgery
- Medical career
- Profession: Doctor
- Field: Medical field
- Institutions: UTMB, Shriners Burns Hospital
- Sub-specialties: Burn care
- Notable works: Garment compression for burn treatment

Sally Abston (1934 – 2008) was an American surgeon and scientist. She is noted as the first woman surgical resident at the University of Texas Medical Branch Galveston (UTMB), where she also worked as part of the faculty.

== Biography ==
Abston was born in Refugio, Texas, on May 29, 1934, to Charles Richard Abston and Susie Abston. She grew up in Fort Worth and Houston. At an early age, she already wanted to be a physician. After finishing her secondary education at Austin High School in 1952, she obtained a degree at the Rice University in 1956. She then pursued her medical degree from the UTMB. After graduating in 1962, she immediately joined UTMB as the first woman surgical resident and, later on, member of the faculty. After her retirement in the field of medicine, she completed a substance abuse counselling programming at Galveston College.

In Abston's honor, the Association of Women Surgeons Foundation established an award called The Dr. Sally Abston AWS Distinguished Member Award, recognizing her commitment to quality patient care and the welfare of medical students.

== Career ==
Abston taught at UTMB for 17 years and was also the director of its Blocker Burn Unit. She also worked for the Shriners Burns Hospital where she treated children. This hospital is noted for developing innovations covering burn care in children. Abston is credited for developing garment compression for burn treatment that improved the appearance of scars. She successfully demonstrated how to maintain body weight in children with serious burns through the consistent enteral feeding of milk. In a study with two other doctors involving children treated for burn injury, she identified burns as a silent epidemic in the United States.

Abston was also cited as the pioneer in Ketamine anesthesia in the treatment of pediatric burn as well as the use of early excision and grafting in burn care.

Abston died on August 27, 2008, in Galveston due to kidney failure and hypertension.

== Publications ==
- Heimburger, Richard A.; Marten, Ernesto; Larson, Duane L.; Abston, Sally; Lewis, Stephen R. (1973-05-01). "Burned feet in children: Acute and reconstructive care". The American Journal of Surgery. 125 (5): 575–579. doi:10.1016/0002-9610(73)90140-2. ISSN 0002-9610. PMID 4144651.
- Watson, Larry C.; Abston, Sally (1976-12-01). "Prevention of upper gastrointestinal hemorrhage in 582 burned children". The American Journal of Surgery. 132 (6): 790–793. doi:10.1016/0002-9610(76)90460-8. ISSN 0002-9610. PMID 1087124.
- Minifee, Paul K.; Barrow, Robert E.; Abston, Sally; Desai, Manubhai; Herndon, David N. (1989). "Improved myocardial oxygen utilization following propranolol infusion in adolescents with postburn hypermetabolism". Journal of Pediatric Surgery. 24 (8): 806–811. doi:10.1016/s0022-3468(89)80541-x. PMID 2769550.
