= Queen of the Waves =

French fishermen's hymn for protection from storms

Queen of the Waves is a French Marian hymn (author unknown) sung by French fishermen seeking protection from storms.

In the United States, it became well known as a result of the Galveston Hurricane of 1900. The nuns of the St. Mary's Orphan asylum had the orphans sing this song (in English) in order to calm them. Of the 93 children and 10 sisters in the orphanage, only three teenage boys survived.

As a result of this event, the Sisters of Charity of the Incarnate Word across the world sing this song every year on 8 September, and remember the sisters and orphans that died that day.

The Sisters of Charity recorded an audio CD titled Queen of the Waves: Centennial Remembrance of The Great Storm of 1900 available for purchase or free download.

== Lyrics ==
Queen of the Waves, look forth across the ocean
From north to south, from east to stormy west,
See how the waters with tumultuous motion
Rise up and foam without a pause or rest.

But fear we not, tho' storm clouds round us gather,
Thou art our Mother and thy little Child
Is the All Merciful, our loving Brother
God of the sea and of the tempest wild.

Help then, sweet Queen, in our exceeding danger,
By thy seven griefs, in pity Lady save;
Think of the Babe that slept within the manger
And help us now, dear Lady of the Wave.

Up to thy shrine we look and see the glimmer
Thy votive lamp sheds down on us afar;
Light of our eyes, oh let it ne'er grow dimmer,
Till in the sky we hail the morning star.

Then joyful hearts shall kneel around thine altar
And grateful psalms re-echo down the nave;
Never our faith in thy sweet power can falter,
Mother of God, our Lady of the Wave.
