= Christus Health =

International Catholic nonprofit health system

- Type: Private
- Industry: Health care
- Predecessor: Sisters of Charity of the Incarnate Word Healthcare System
- Founded: 1999; 27 years ago
- Headquarters: Irving, Texas, United States
- Area served: United States, Chile, Mexico and Colombia
- Website: www.christushealth.org

Christus Health (stylized as CHRISTUS Health) is an international Catholic nonprofit health system based in Irving, Texas, United States.

== History ==
The present company was formed on January 28, 1999 by the merger of Houston's Sisters of Charity Health Care System and San Antonio's Incarnate Word Health System; however its history extends back to 1866, with the founding of St. Mary's Hospital in Galveston, Texas, by the Sisters of Charity religious institute.

Another significant merger came in 2016 when Christus merged with Trinity Mother Frances Hospitals and Clinics (itself the product of a merger of two Catholic-based systems), giving it a major presence in East Texas.

Christus Health services can be found in 60 cities in Texas, Arkansas, Louisiana, and New Mexico in the U.S.; also, in the Pontificia Universidad Católica de Chile Health Network in Santiago, Chile, and Chihuahua, Coahuila, Nuevo León, Puebla, San Luis Potosí, and Tamaulipas in Mexico.

The system comprises almost 350 services and facilities, including more than 60 hospitals and long-term care facilities, 175 clinics and outpatient centers and dozens of other health ministries and ventures. Its corporate headquarters are in Irving, Texas. It employs approximately 30,000 people and has more than 9,500 physicians.
