= Charles Milton Strother =

American radiologist

Charles M. Strother is Emeritus Professor of Radiology at the University of Wisconsin–Madison. He was born in McKinney, Texas. He earned his M.D. at the University of Texas Medical Branch. Dr. Strother completed his residencies and fellowships in Neurology, Diagnostic Radiology, and Neuroradiology at Stanford University Medical Center and UCSF School of Medicine. Since then, his work has resulted in over 200 scientific publications. He is past president of the American Society of Neuroradiology (2003–2004). He has trained dozens of radiologists, neurologists, and neurosurgeons in diagnostic and interventional neuroradiology.
