= Sean Roden =

NASA flight surgeon

Sean K. Roden
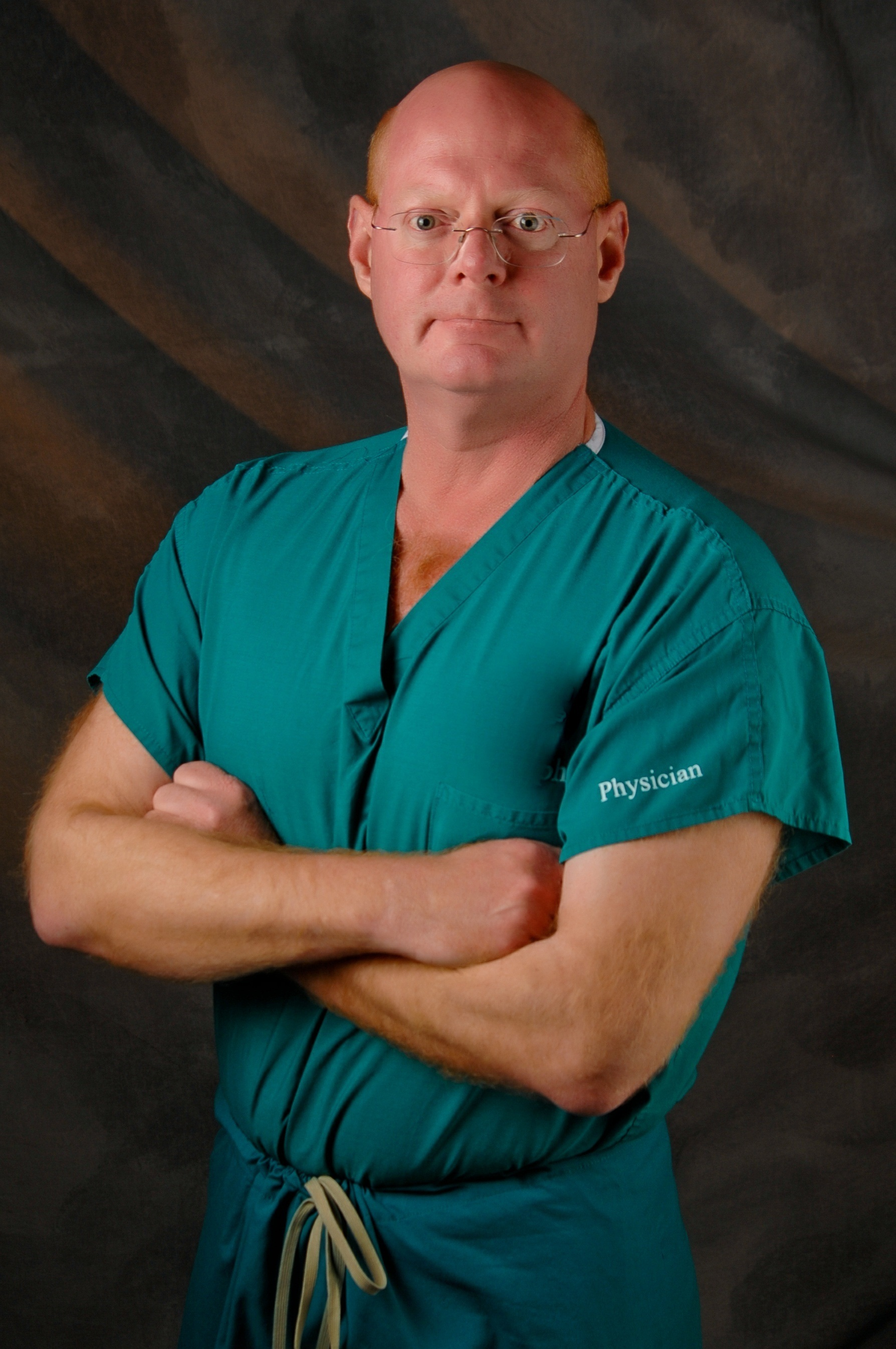
- Sean Roden
- Born: Midland, Texas
- Education: BA, University of Texas at Austin; MS, University of Texas Permian Basin; MD, University of Texas Medical Branch
- Occupation: Medical doctor
- Known for: NASA Flight surgeon

Sean Kevin Roden (born 1965) was a NASA flight surgeon with multiple roles for medical operations including for the International Space Station (ISS) from 2004 to 2007.

== Biography ==
Roden was born April 19, 1965, in Midland, Texas, the son of Midland oilman William (Bill) Roden and Carolyn Jones Roden,

He graduated from Midland High School in 1983. He completed an associate degree in paramedic technology at Austin Community College in 1985, followed by a Bachelor of Arts in kinesiology and exercise physiology from The University of Texas, and a Master of Science in genetics from The University of Texas-Permian Basin in 1990.

In 1994, he completed an externship with the "Royal Flying Doctor Service" and "The Australian Rural Health Service" in Yuendumu Aboriginal Nation, Northern Territory, Alice Springs. After his residency, he returned to Midland, Texas, and practiced emergency medicine at Midland Memorial Hospital. In 1997, he became an FAA medical examiner practicing from his family ranch in West Texas.

He received his M.D. in 1994 from the University of Texas Medical Branch in Galveston, Texas, and completed his residency in emergency medicine at Scott and White Hospital in Temple, Texas, where he was chief resident from 1996 to 1997. In 2002, he obtained his Master of Public Health and completed an aerospace medicine fellowship at The University of Texas Medical Branch (UTMB), Galveston.

He married Sonya Crump on June 20, 1998.

== Medical career ==
While serving as a NASA flight surgeon, he was a clinical assistant professor in Preventive Medicine and Community Health at University of Texas Medical Branch. He was also a preceptor at Texas A&M Health Science Center from 2006 to 2007 and then as an assistant professor in 2008–2010. He is on the Advisory Council for the University of Texas Permian Basin.

From October 2012 to February 2013, Roden served as medical officer/expeditionary physician for the National Science Foundation South Pole Station, supporting station personnel and summer expeditionary away teams in the Trans Antarctic range, and was medical support during the race around the world and South Pole marathon events. He was interviewed by Ira Glass on This American Life about his time at the station.

In 2017, Roden started for The Emergency Center at West 7th LLC in Fort Worth, Texas.

== NASA career ==
Roden was selected for the UTMB aerospace medicine residency in conjunction with NASA in 2000. During this period he spent time at the Yuri Gagarin Cosmonaut Training Center in Star City, Russia. He was selected as deputy crew surgeon for Expedition 7.

At NASA, Roden served as a backup crew member to Josef Schmid, for the NASA-NOAA NEEMO 12 (NASA Extreme Environment Mission Operations) mission in May 2007. NEEMO 12 was the first time for NASA flight surgeons to be included on a NEEMO mission. In August 2007, he also served as a backup crew member to NASA astronaut Rick Arnold on the 13th NEEMO undersea mission. Roden acted as deputy surgeon for the STS 120 Discovery shuttle mission and crew surgeon for ISS 10 A stage mission.

In 2004, when the International Space Station ran low on food supplies, Roden oversaw the calories and nutritional intake of the astronauts. During his time as deputy flight surgeon for the Discovery mission in 2007, he was the first flight surgeon to break news to an astronaut about a death in the family while in space. Roden has been interviewed by Miles O'Brien on CNN's "American Morning" Melissa Block on National Public Radio's "All Things Considered," and The New York Times.

Roden's other NASA missions include:

- Deputy crew surgeon for Expedition 7, 2002
- NASA/DOD liaison flight surgeon for Expedition 8 in 2003
- Lead flight surgeon for Expedition 10 in 2004
- Ascent and Entry surgeon for STS-118
- Deputy Crew Surgeon for STS 120
- Crew Surgeon for STS 10 A stage
- Deputy flight surgeon and medical officer in C-9 Reduced Gravity Flight program from 2006 to 2008
- Deputy Crew Surgeon for ISS Expedition 42
- Crew Surgeon for ISS Expedition 53 and 60

Roden left NASA in May 2008 for private practice in Bryan, Texas. In 2013, he returned to UTMB in his previous role as expeditionary flight surgeon supporting the International Space Station and NASA crew members. Roden retired from NASA in May 2022.

== Awards ==
Roden has been issued the following awards:

- NASA Silver Snoopy Award 2018
- NASA JSC Group Achievement Award to the STS 122 Flight Surgeon Team 2008
- NASA Superior Achievement Award 2005
- NASA Space Flight Achievement Award Expedition 10 in 2005
- NASA Superior Achievement Award Expedition 7 in 2004
- NASA Individual Performance Award 2004
- Special Space Flight Achievement Award Expedition 7 in 2003
- Special Space Flight Achievement Award 2003
- NASA Flight Crew Operations Directorate GEM Award
- Distinguished Alumni Award -The University of Texas Permian Basin 2000

== Organizations ==
Roden is a Fellow of the Aerospace Medical Association (Space Medicine Branch). Additionally he is a member of the Wilderness Medical Society, American College of Sports Medicine, Society of NASA Flight Surgeons, American College of Forensic Examiners life member, American Medical Association life member, Texas Medical Association, Galveston County Medical Society, AOPA, and Commemorative Air Force life member, Aircraft Owners and Pilots Association, and Experimental Aircraft Association.

== Published Research ==
- Principal investigator on Periodic Fitness Evaluation with Oxygen Uptake Measurement
- Musculoskeletal Diagnostic Imaging with Ultrasound on the International Space Station
- Blood-Injection-Injury Phobia in a Commercial Aviator: a Case Report
