= Midland High School (Midland, Texas) =

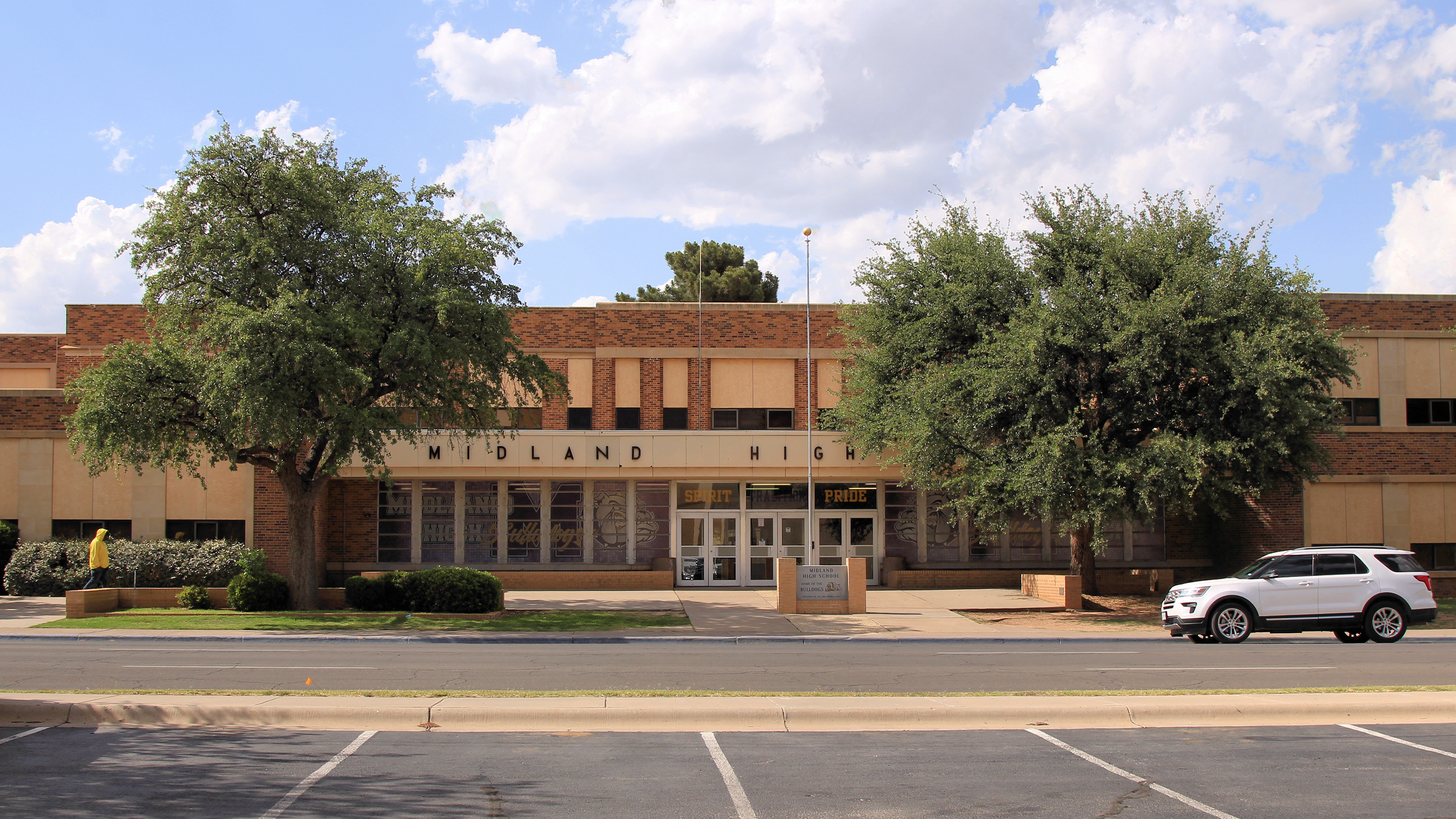
- The main entrance of Midland High School

Location
- 906 W Illinois Ave; Midland, TX 79701; United States; 31.9996°N 102.0851°W

Information
- Type: Public
- Motto: Earn The Right
- Established: 1926
- School district: Midland Independent School District
- Principal: Jennifer Seybert
- Faculty: 131.43 (FTE)
- Grades: 10-12
- Student to teacher ratio: 19.61
- Colors: Purple and gold
- Athletics: Football, volleyball, basketball, baseball, track, cross country, soccer, softball, swimming, golf, tennis, Lacrosse, Powerlifting
- Athletics conference: 6A Region I District 2
- Mascot: Bulldog
- Website: Midland High School

Midland High School (officially Midland Senior High School) is a public high school located in Midland, Texas and is part of Midland Independent School District. The original Midland High School was built in 1926 and was moved twenty-three years later to a new building in 1949 where it currently sits today. In recent years, Midland High School has received major renovations including complete asbestos removal and new West Wing that houses science, math, and social studies classroom. Also, renovations to their large gym including new floors and new bleachers. The practice field of the Midland High football team Memorial Stadium has also received a new turf.

Midland High School hosts only high school sophomores, juniors, and seniors (10th-12th grades) as Midland Freshman High School serves as a feeder school hosting freshman high school students. Both Midland High School and Midland Freshman High School use the same school mascot, the Midland High Bulldog.

The current principal is Dr. Jennifer Seybert. The Associate Principal is Jared Andrews and the Academic Dean is Sara Anderson.

== History ==
Midland High School's history goes back to the establishment of Midland County back in 1885. It was the first school in Midland County. The one room school house was for all grades. Sixty-four students attended the first school in Midland County. In 1893, a two-story brick schoolhouse was built and the top floor was for the secondary students. In 1907, Midland Independent School District was established. The first building to be officially named Midland High School was built in 1926 on the site of what is now Fasken Center, at 600 Texas Street. After 23 years in the Texas Street location, in 1949 Midland High School moved to its present location at 906 West Illinois. The land which Midland High was based on was donated by the Cowdens. The legendary bulldog mascot was chosen for Midland High in 1925, and purple and gold were chosen for the school colors in 1929.

On January 7, 1955, Elvis Presley performed at Midland High along with several other acts from the Louisiana Hayride in what was billed as a "Western Show." Elvis performed at Midland High for two more performances on May 31, 1955, and October 12, 1955. Each show cost $1.25 in advance and $1.50 at the door, with children tickets for 50 cents and student tickets for 75 cents.

In recent years, Midland High enrollment has grown steadily due to the effects of the oil industry on the Permian Basin region. As Midland's population rapidly expanded from roughly 100,000 people to approximately 150,000 people between 2000 and 2015, Midland ISD has struggled to keep up with increased enrollment. To deal with a student population projected to rise by as much as 9,700 students in the next 10 years, the Midland ISD Facility Master Planning Committee presented a plan that calls for $545.8 million bond election in as early May and more than $910 million in total projects over the next decade. In November 2019, the Midland ISD secondary school bond election resulted in local political drama as the initial vote was close enough to call for a recount. The school, in the 2023 Midland ISD Bond, will be constructing a new campus at the old site of Ranchland Hills Gold Club, near the intersection of Loop 250 [Texas State Highway Loop 250] and Fairgrounds Road. Midland High is fed into by two of the Midland Junior Highs, San Jacinto Jr High School, Home of the Mustangs, and Goddard Jr High, Home of the Raiders.

== Academics ==
Over the course of 2003–2004, Midland High produced 5 National Merit Finalists, 11 National Merit Commended Scholars, 3 National Hispanic Scholars, and 2 National Hispanic Honorable Mention Scholars.

== Traditions ==
CATOICO, Midland High School's equivalent of prom, was first established in 1929 and stands for Midland's three major commodities: CAttle, OIl, and COtton. CATOICO – pronounced commonly as cuh TOY cuh – is one of the oldest traditions in the state of Texas. The first CATOICO Queen was Martha Louise Nobles Black. Originally, the title went to the girl who was the most successful yearbook fundraiser. Since 1939, the student body has chosen the CATOICO court. The first CATOICO coronation activities were in 1936.

The CATOICO court still exists to this day, and the means of the election process is different. Contrary to the title going to the person with the most successful yearbook sales, the election process has become more complex. Students have to complete a CATOICO packet that includes: recommendations from teachers, grades, extra-curricular, etc. Then when that is completed, the students are then expected to do a video that will be presented in front of the whole student body, where they will then decide the CATOICO court, king and queen.

== Sports ==
Athletics have a winning tradition at Midland High School. From 1957 to 1965, the cross-country track team won the state championship. The boys swimming team, started in 1961, was flourishing by 1968 when MHS alum Doug Russell won two Gold Medals in the 1968 Olympics. In 1965, the girls swim team was established and they won two consecutive state titles. The MHS baseball team won the state championship in 1973 and in 2001. The basketball team went to state in 1973, 1994, and won the championship in 1998. The boys soccer team went to the state championship in 1994 as well. By 1996, the girls basketball team had won its fourth consecutive district championship.

- In December 2002, Midland High School went to the state football final.
- In 1973 and 2001, Midland High School's baseball team won the state championship.
- In 1998, Midland High School's boys basketball team won the state championship.
- Midland High tennis won the boys state championship in 1976, 1977, & 1978. Most recently, Midland High won the 2018 Girls Doubles title, and in 2021, Tyler Stewart won the boys singles championship.
- In 1965 and 1966, Midland High School's woman's swim team won two consecutive state titles.
- In 2002, 2022, and 2023 the Midland High School Marching Band made it to the State Marching Competition.

== Notable alumni ==
- Christi Craddick, member of the Texas Railroad Commission
- Tom Craddick, former Speaker of the Texas House of Representatives, state representative from Midland since 1969
- Antwan Goodley, wide receiver for the Seattle Seahawks
- J. Evetts Haley, historian of the American West, political activist
- Natalie Hinds, 2020 U.S. Olympic Team swimmer
- Bryce Hoppel, middle-distance runner
- Michael Loren Mauldin, founder of Lycos
- Wahoo McDaniel, professional football for the Dallas Texans, Houston Oilers, Denver Broncos, New York Jets and Miami Dolphins, professional wrestler.
- Thurber T. Mingus (A.K.A. Kyle Merren), Singer and guitarist of southern metal band Pumpjack and soupergroup Gasoline
- Jayson Nix, utility player for the New York Yankees
- Laynce Nix, outfielder that is currently a free agent
- Sean Roden, former NASA flight surgeon
- Doug Russell, 1968 Olympic gold medalist
- Mike Stanton, pitcher for the Cincinnati Reds
- Mike Timlin, pitcher for the Boston Red Sox
- James Zachery, Canadian Football League player
