= Sealy & Smith Foundation =

Coordinates: 29°18′17″N 94°47′38″W

- Founded: 1922
- Founder: John Sealy, II; Jennie Sealy Smith
- Type: Grant making private foundation (IRS exemption status): 501(c)(3)
- Purpose: Healthcare
- Location: 2200 Market Street, Galveston, Texas
- Region served: Galveston, Texas
- Method: Endowment
- Key people: John W. Kelso; George Sealy; Michael Doherty
- Endowment: $681 million USD
- Website: www.sealy-smith-foundation.org

The Sealy & Smith Foundation is a charitable foundation incorporated in Texas and based in the island city of Galveston. It was established in 1922 by John Sealy, II and his sister Jennie Sealy Smith with a charter stating a mission to:

"support of a charitable undertaking in the City of Galveston, Texas, for the construction, remodeling, enlarging, equipping, and furnishing of the John Sealy Hospital, and other hospital building or buildings in the City of Galveston in connection with the John Sealy Hospital in said city, and endowment thereof, for the use of the people of said City of Galveston and providing them with the necessary medical care and attention therein."

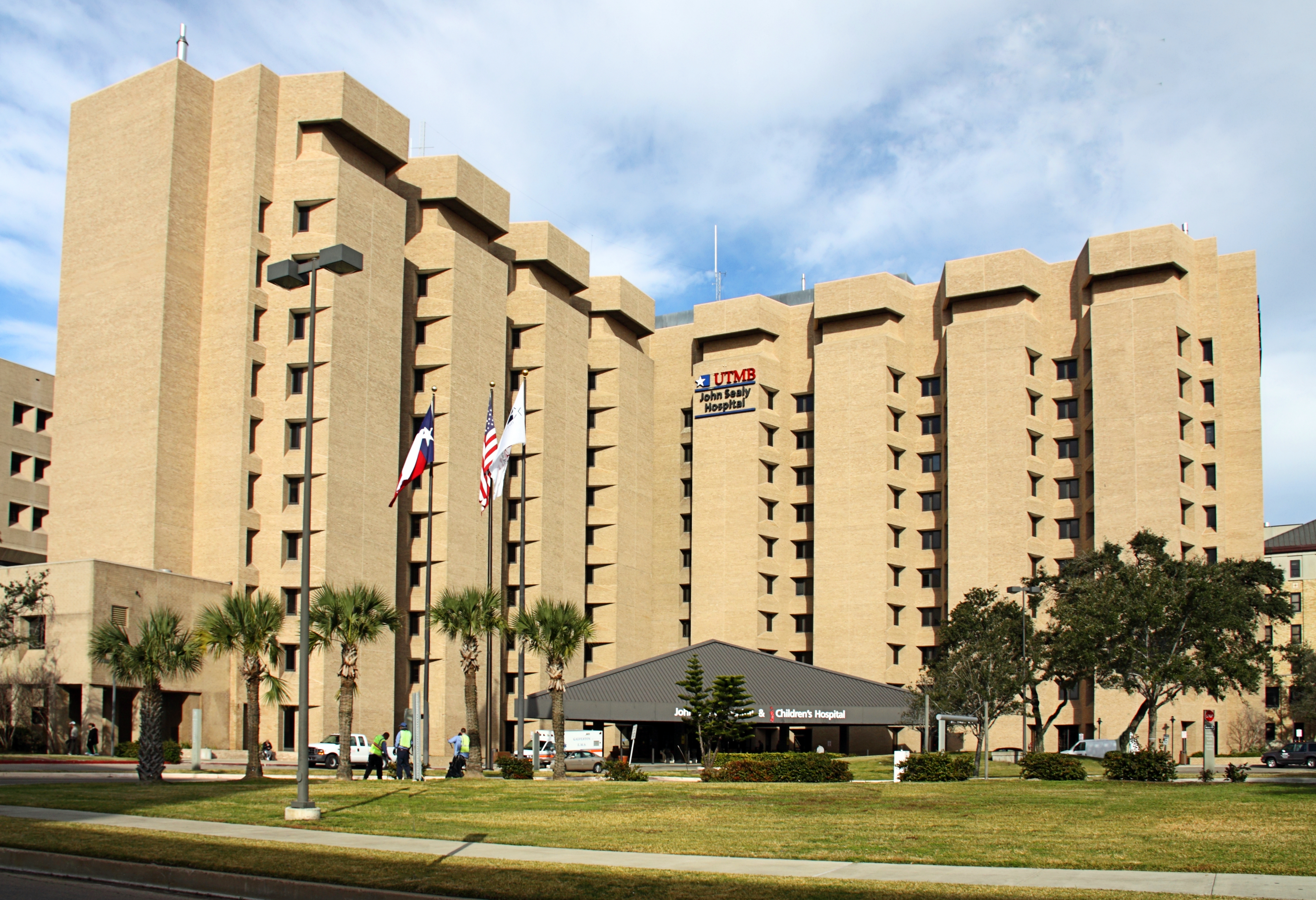
The John Sealy Hospital's construction was funded by the foundation

The foundation's endowment is funded from various sources, including mineral rights in the Permian Basin. It focuses the majority of its funding on programs supporting the healthcare and research at the University of Texas Medical Branch and its primary care facility, the John Sealy Hospital. Since its inception the foundation has contributed more than $800 million towards construction and equipping of medical facilities on the university's Galveston campus. In 2011 the foundation committed $170 million towards the construction of Jennie Sealy Hospital on the UTMB campus, an amount that represents the largest single gift ever to a Texas health institution.

== See also ==
- John Sealy Hospital
- Rebecca Sealy Hospital
