= Journal of the American College of Radiology =

- Discipline: Radiology
- Language: English
- Edited by: Ruth Carlos

Publication details
- History: 2004-present
- Publisher: Elsevier
- Frequency: Monthly
- Impact factor: 5.532 (2020)

Standard abbreviations
- ISO 4: J. Am. Coll. Radiol.

Indexing
- ISSN: 1546-1440 (print); 1558-349X (web)
- LCCN: 2003215459
- OCLC no.: 525864891

Links
- Journal homepage; Online access; Online archive

The Journal of the American College of Radiology (sometimes abbreviated JACR) is a monthly peer-reviewed medical journal covering radiology. It was established in 2004 and is published by Elsevier on behalf of the American College of Radiology, of which it is the official journal. The journal's founding editor-in-chief was Bruce J. Hillman (University of Virginia) with Ruth C. Carlos (University of Michigan) succeeding Hillman on January 1, 2019. It is sometimes called the "blue journal". According to the Journal Citation Reports, the journal has a 2020 impact factor of 5.532.
