= St. Mary's Hospital, Galveston =

St. Mary's Hospital
- Sisters of Charity of the Incarnate Word

Geography
- Location: Galveston, Texas, United States

Organization
- Care system: Nonprofit
- Type: General

Services
- Beds: 322 (at close)

History
- Opened: 1866
- Closed: 1996

Links
- Website: http://www.christushealth.org/about_legacy_call.htm
- Lists: Hospitals in Texas

St. Mary's Hospital was a Catholic hospital founded in 1866 by the Sisters of Charity of the Incarnate Word in Galveston, Texas, United States.

Founded in 1867, it was the first private hospital in Texas.

In 1869, the hospital became St. Mary's Infirmary, and it was renamed as St. Mary's Hospital in 1965. St. Mary's Hospital School of Nursing opened in 1907 and continued through 1968.

The hospital was closed and sold in 1996 to the neighboring University of Texas Medical Branch.

== See also ==
- Christus Health
