= John Sealy Hospital =

- University of Texas Medical Branch
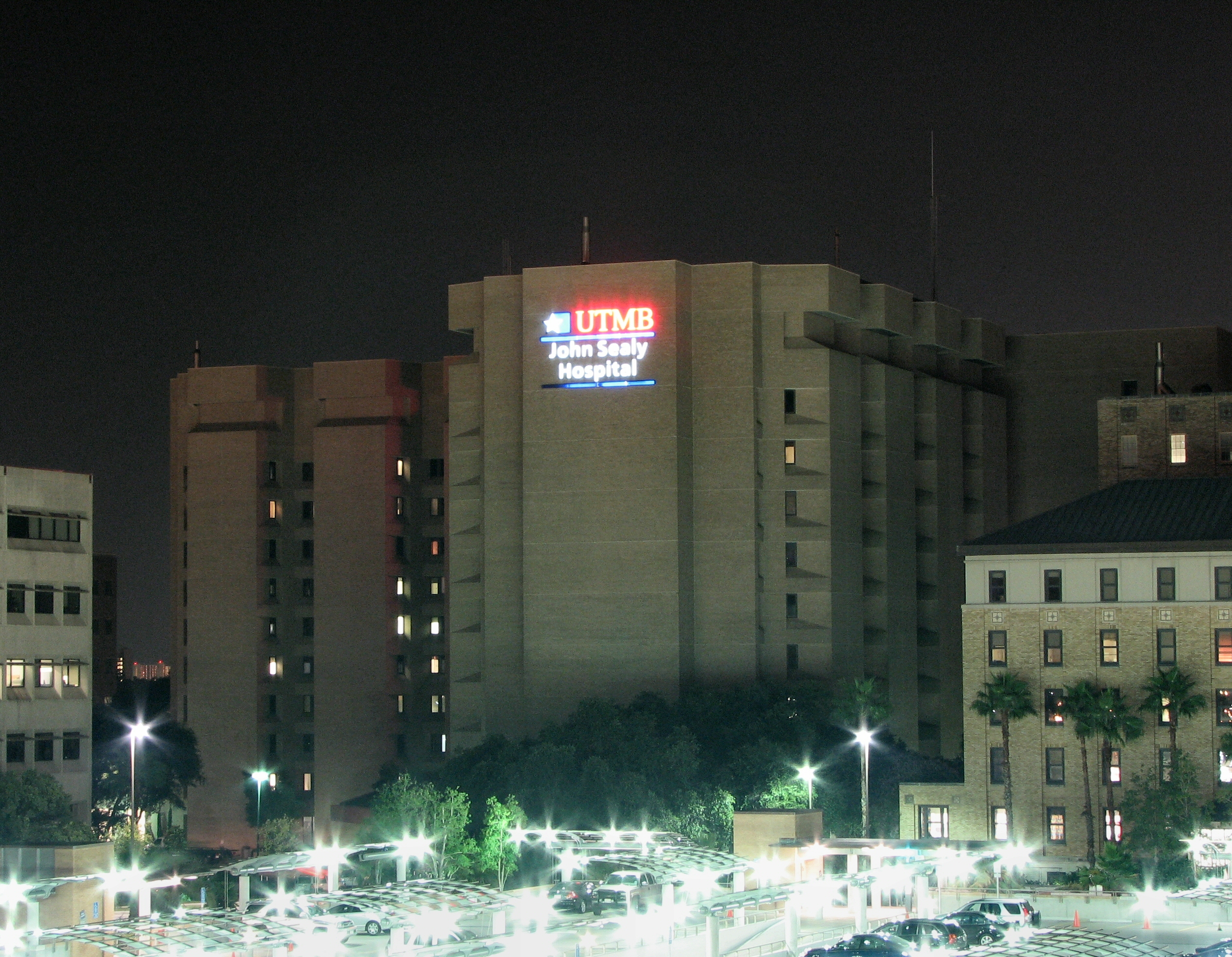

Geography
- Location: Galveston, Texas, United States
- Coordinates: 29.3108°N 94.7772°W

Organization
- Care system: Public
- Type: General and Teaching Hospital
- Affiliated university: University of Texas Medical Branch

Services
- Emergency department: Level I trauma center
- Beds: 550 (Pre-Hurricane Ike)

Helipads
- Helipad: FAA LID: 9TA7
Number	Length		Surface
Number	ft	m	Surface
H1	35	11	rooftop (concrete)
H2	35	11	rooftop (concrete)

History
- Founded: 1890

Links
- Website: www.utmbhealth.com
- Lists: Hospitals in Texas

John Sealy Hospital is a hospital that is a part of the University of Texas Medical Branch complex in Galveston, Texas, United States.

== History ==
Sealy opened on January 10, 1890. It was founded by the widow and brother of one of the richest citizens of Texas, John Sealy after his death. Accompanied by the John Sealy Hospital Training School for Nurses, which was opened two months after the hospital, the foundation became the primary teaching facility of University of Texas Medical Branch opened in October 1891. In 1922, John Sealy's children, John Sealy, II and Jennie Sealy Smith established the Sealy & Smith Foundation for the hospital. This enabled construction of several new facilities, including the Rebecca Sealy Nurses' home.

A second John Sealy Hospital was built in 1954 to replace the 1890 building. Today it is known as the John Sealy Annex and houses administrative and support services.

The current John Sealy Hospital was completed in 1978 at a cost of $32.5 million and was funded in full by the Sealy & Smith Foundation. The 12-story hospital includes single-patient rooms and specialized intensive care units. Other features include the Acute Care for Elders Unit, or ACE Unit and a Level I Trauma Center, one of only three in the entire Greater Houston area.

The Sealy & Smith Foundation has contributed over $600 million to UTMB since its inception.

== Hurricane Ike ==
Hurricane Ike forced the closing of UTMB temporarily. John Sealy Hospital and its trauma center have reopened, with renovations being undertaken in damaged areas.

== See also ==
- List of Texas Medical Center institutions
- List of hospitals in Texas
- Rebecca Sealy Hospital
