= David Leebron =

American university president and law school dean

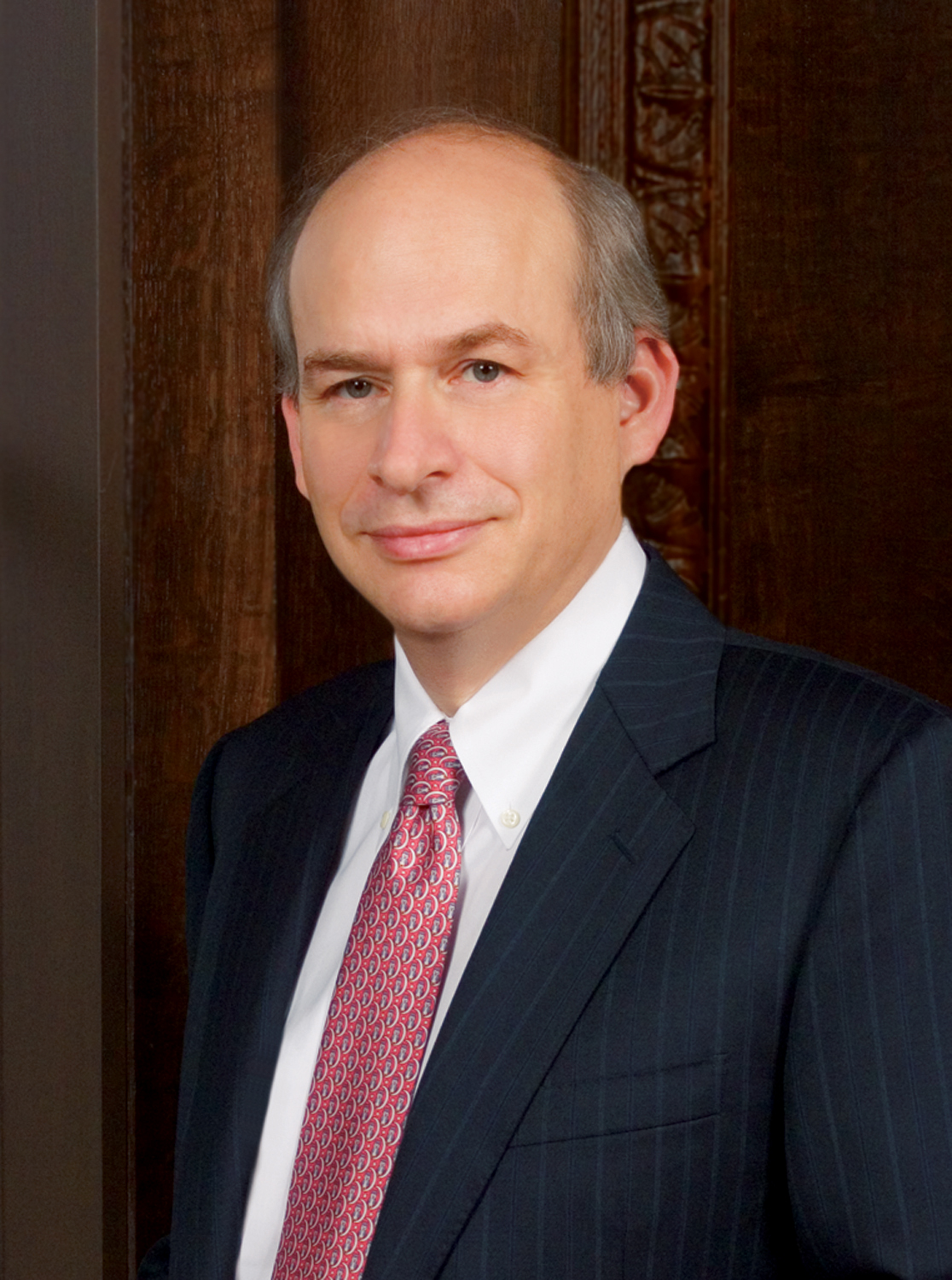

7th President of Rice University
- In office July 1, 2004 – June 30, 2022
- Preceded by: S. Malcolm Gillis
- Succeeded by: Reginald DesRoches

Personal details
- Born: February 12, 1955 (age 71) Philadelphia, Pennsylvania, U.S.
- Spouse: Y. Ping Sun (m. 1990)
- Children: 2
- Education: Harvard University (BA, JD)

Academic work
- Discipline: Law
- Institutions: University of California, Los Angeles; New York University; Columbia University; Rice University

David W. Leebron (born February 12, 1955) is an American academic administrator and legal scholar who served as the 7th President of Rice University from 2004 to 2022 and as the dean of Columbia Law School from 1996 to 2004. In 2024, he was named the new president and CEO of Texas 2036.

== Early life and education ==
Born to Carol Leebron and Norman Leebron on February 12, 1955, David Leebron was raised Jewish in Philadelphia, Pennsylvania. An Eagle Scout, Leebron was influenced by a steady stream of exchange students in his house—from Europe, Japan and Mexico—to develop an interest in international affairs. He later traveled to Germany as an exchange student himself and speaks German. He graduated from William Penn Charter School.

Leebron earned a B.A., summa cum laude, in history and science from Harvard College in 1976. He then attended and his J.D., magna cum laude, from Harvard Law School in 1979. As a law student, Leebron was the president of the Harvard Law Review. His classmate John Roberts, who would later become the 17th Chief Justice of the U.S. Supreme Court, served with Leebron as the journal's managing editor.

== Career ==
=== Early career ===
After law school, Leebron was a law clerk to U.S. circuit judge Shirley Hufstedler of the U.S. Court of Appeals for the Ninth Circuit from 1979 to 1980. He taught as a professor at the UCLA School of Law for a semester. Leebron then entered private practice from 1981 to 1983 as an associate at the New York firm Cleary, Gottlieb, Steen & Hamilton. He then re-entered academia as a law professor at New York University and the director of NYU's International Legal Studies Program from 1983 to 1989. In 1989 he joined the faculty at Columbia Law School, where he became dean in 1996. He became President of Rice University in 2004. As a professor, he taught and published in areas of corporate finance, international economic law, human rights, privacy and torts. He was also a co-author of a textbook on human rights, though most recently has written about problems in international trade law. He is member of the New York State Bar and, currently inactive, the Hawaii and Pennsylvania bars. He is on the American Law Deans Association Board of Directors. He has served on the Association of American Law Schools Committee on Nominations. He is also a member of the American Law Institute (ex officio), the Council on Foreign Relations, the American Society of International Law, the board of directors of the IMAX Corporation and the editorial board of Foundation Press.

=== Columbia Law School ===
As Dean of Columbia Law School, Leebron approximately doubled the annual giving and the school's endowment, enhancing financial aid and support for students who enter public service. He was known for recruiting promising junior faculty.

=== Rice University ===
Leebron became the 7th President of Rice University on the first of June in 2004.

Under Leebron's leadership, the campus added two new residential colleges; the 10-story BioScience Research Collaborative, where scientists and educators from Rice and other Texas Medical Center institutions work together; a new recreation and wellness center; an additional food servery; a central campus pavilion that serves as a meeting and study place; an updated sports arena; a new physics building; and the Public Art Program, a presidential initiative that added art across campus, although the university suffered a disappointing setback when merger talks between Baylor College of Medicine and Rice stalled.

As president, Leebron pushed the creation of a vision for the university, called the Vision for the Second Century. Leebron set forth a plan for expansion, calling for opinions from the Rice community. The vision called for expanding the undergraduate body to around 3800, adding two more residential colleges and expanding the current ones. The new students would mostly come from outside Texas, while the number of students from Texas would hold steady at around 1300 students.

In November 2008, Leebron traveled to Iran as part of an academic tour sponsored by the Association of American Universities. On this four-day tour, he visited Sharif University, Iran's top engineering school, where he took part in an open question and answer session with Iranian students. Leebron compared his visit to the opening of relations with China during the 1970s.

On May 26, 2021, Leebron announced that he would resign as President of Rice effective June 30, 2022.

== Personal life ==
Leebron married Y. Ping Sun in 1990. Leebron and Sun have two children, Daniel and Mei.

Academic offices
Preceded by S. Malcolm Gillis	President of Rice University; 2004–2022	Succeeded by Reginald DesRoches
Preceded by Lance Liebman	Dean of Columbia Law School; 1996–2004	Succeeded by David Schizer
