= Ben Taub =

American philanthropist

Ben Taub (1889–1982) was a philanthropist and medical benefactor from Houston, Texas. Taub ran numerous businesses and served on the boards of directors for several Texas organizations. He helped in the expansion and development of Houston entities such as the Texas Medical Center and the University of Houston. Ben Taub General Hospital, a large hospital in Houston, is named for him.

== Biography ==
=== Early life ===
His family were Jewish immigrants from the Austro-Hungarian empire and his father Jacob Nathan Taub moved to Texas in 1882. Ben Taub's family were poor and his father used to sell newspapers to make their living. Jacob Nathan later opened a tobacco store in downtown Houston. By the time Ben, their fourth child, was born they had become relatively comfortable. Taub grew up in Houston, where he attended Welch Preparatory School. During World War I, he was a captain and served in France.

=== Business career ===
He returned to Texas and expanded the family business, later becoming a real estate developer. He chaired and operated dozens of companies throughout his life, including his role as the director, chairman and senior chairman of the board of Texas Commerce Bank; chairman of the board at McGregor Park National Bank; and director at the American General Insurance Company. At one time he simultaneously served on 23 boards, including a 15-year stint as the president and then chairman of DePelchin Faith Home; president of the Baylor Medical Foundation; trustee of the Baylor College of Medicine; president of the Taub Foundation; director at the Child Welfare League of America; chairman of the Board of Managers at Houston Tuberculosis Hospital; a founding board member at TIRR; director and life director at the Texas Medical Center; trustee of St. Thomas University (Texas); 32° Mason, Master Mason, Awarded Fifty Year Masonic Grand Lodge Award; district director, Office of Price Administration (WWII); chairman, Community Chest, United Fund, which is now United Way, among many others.

In 1936, Ben Taub donated thirty-five acres to establish a permanent campus for the University of Houston. He further persuaded the heirs of J.J. Settegast to donate seventy five acres to the campus. In 1943, he was instrumental in encouraging Baylor College of Medicine to move from Dallas to the Texas Medical Center in Houston. As chairman of the board of Jefferson Davis Hospital, he and Michael E. DeBakey made Jefferson Davis Hospital a teaching facility for Baylor College of Medicine, a relationship that continued after the creation of the Harris County Hospital District.

Taub never married and often spent his time visiting patients in the county hospital. For years he helped run the DePelchin Faith Home for homeless children. He worked with the Pauline Sterne Wolf Foundation. He also worked with Charles D. Massey, Harris County Commissioner for Precinct 2, on charitable endeavors. During the Great Depression, he had a chauffeur driven automobile, a Pierce-Arrow. He was a director of the Texas Medical Center, headed the United Way, gave out scholarships, and sponsored visiting medical professors. He served as chairman of the Jefferson Davis Hospital from 1935 to 1964.

=== Later life ===
When Houston's new charity hospital opened in 1963, the hospital board, in recognition of Taub's service, named it Ben Taub General Hospital. It became renowned as one of the nation's leading major trauma centers. Ben Taub died at age ninety-two on September 9, 1982. Baylor College of Medicine opened the Ben Taub Research Center in 1986. In 1990, the Harris County Hospital District opened the new six-story 500+ bed Ben Taub General Hospital.
