= The Texas Medical Center Library =

Coordinates: 29.7120°N 95.3967°W

The Texas Medical Center (TMC) Library is a health sciences library located in the Texas Medical Center (TMC) in Houston, TX. The TMC Library is the only major medical and scientific library serving the entire 1,345 sq. acre Texas Medical Center (TMC) campus and its non-profit institutions. It offers librarian services, and provides biomedical information for education and research activities to take place, and study space for students for these schools to help maintain their accreditation.

Additionally, for the past twenty-five years, the TMC Library has been the home site for the National Network of Libraries of Medicine – South Central Region (NN/LM SCR). Through a competitive bid process, the TMC Library has secured the contract from the National Library of Medicine, under the National Institutes of Health.

== History ==
The TMC Library was founded in 1915 to serve the physicians of the Harris County Medical Society (HCMS) and has expanded significantly over the last 100 years. When Baylor College of Medicine (BCM) arrived in 1946, the school and the Harris County Medical Society decided to combine their collections into a single library to better serve the physicians of Harris County and the educational and research programs of BCM. This newly formed library would be under the jurisdiction of the Houston Academy of Medicine (HAM), a 501(c)3 entity created in the 1940s by HCMS that identified the Library as an independent tax-exempt organization. In 1949, HAM with nearly 18,000 volumes and BCM with almost 16,000 volumes in its collection, formalized their agreement to create a central, shared library under the jurisdiction of HAM which would serve all of the TMC. Later, The University of Texas Health Science Center and Texas Woman's University joined and a consortium was born.

The permanent building for this new library came shortly after in the early 1950s, through the efforts of a group of forward thinkers from HCMS and BCM, interested in the growth of the TMC and in a strong library to support medical education. These individuals secured funds from major Foundations and other leading community philanthropists to build a separate facility to house the Library. Jesse H. Jones made a personal gift for the construction of the building and in 1954, the Jesse H. Jones Library Building was dedicated with approximately 27,000 square feet of space over three floors. The building bears Mr. Jones' name and is the only building to do so in the TMC. The cornerstone of the 1954 building reads: “Jesse H. Jones Library Building of the Houston Academy of Medicine for the Texas Medical Center.”

As educational institutions, research facilities and hospitals began moving to the campus, the needs placed upon the library increased proportionately.

In 1974 a new addition to the south side of the Library added 49,000 square feet to the existing space. This project was funded by the Houston Endowment, M.D. Anderson Foundation and U.S. Department of Health and Human Services.

At this time, the Library officially became known as the Houston Academy of Medicine – Texas Medical Center Library. The new library went through several name changes over the past decades, and in late 1970 received its current official name, the Houston Academy of Medicine – Texas Medical Center Library. Today the Library operates under a DBA as The TMC Library.

During the digital age in the 90's, the Library added computerized classrooms and a lab for education classes and computer workstations for students and patrons. Tropical Storm Allison severely damaged the Library's street level in 2001 where the classrooms and lab were, but the damage was repaired and flood walls and gates were added with assistance from the Federal Emergency Management Agency (FEMA).

In 2004 a considerable investment in technology ensued, and wireless routers were added that managed to cover 45% of the building – in spite of 3 foot concrete floors. Today, the library has wireless connection throughout the building, including the outside surrounding plazas.

== Library leaders ==
1954	Claude Cody, MD, Chairman of the Board
1955-1957	Moises D. Levy, MD, Chairman of the Board
1955-1957	Moises D. Levy, MD, Chairman of the Board
1957	Helen Holt Garrett, through March 31
1957-1966	Virginia Parker, MLS, Librarian
1967-1971	Jean P. Collier, Acting Librarian
1972-1976	Sam Hitt, MLS, Director
1977-1992	Richard Lyders, MSLS, Executive Director
1993-1995	Nancy Biershenck Casillo, MLS, Interim Executive Director
1996-1999	Naomi C. Broering, MLS, Executive Director
2000-2001	J. Robert Beck, MD, Interim Executive Director
2002-2008	Elizabeth K. Eaton, PhD, Executive Director
2009	Deborah D. Halsted, MLS, MA, Interim Executive Director
2010-2016	L.Maximilian Buja, MD, Executive Director
2017-2020	Debbie Sibley, MLS, MEd, Executive Director
2020-	Katie Prentice, MSIS, Executive Director

== Organizational Governance ==
The TMC Library is a separate entity from the TMC, Corp. (TMC). Unique to medical and research libraries across the country, the Library is a private, stand-alone and not-for-profit 501(c)3 organization independent from any university or research institution. No other library in the Association of Academic Health Sciences Libraries reports to a separate governing board.

There are eight governing institutions of the TMC that are the appointed representatives on the Library Board. They include: Baylor College of Medicine, UTHealth Science Center, The Texas Medical Center, The Houston Academy of Medicine, Texas Woman's University Houston Center, Texas Southern University College of Pharmacy & Health Sciences, U.T. MD Anderson Cancer Center, and the University of Houston - College of Optometry. An additional thirteen supporting organizations are non-governing members of the Library. They include: Harris County Institute of Forensic Sciences, Harris Health System, Houston Community College System, Houston Department of Health and Human Services, LifeGift Organ Donation Center, Memorial Hermann Hospital System (including TIRR), Houston Methodist Hospital, Prairie View A&M University College of Nursing, St. Luke's Episcopal Hospital, Shriners Hospitals for Children, and Texas Children's Hospital.

The TMC Library operates under bylaws and operating agreements to which the Governing Institutions are parties. Its Board of Directors is the Library's governing body and appoints and empowers the Executive Director with rights and responsibilities for the operations of the Library.

The Library allows the educational institutions of the TMC to meet the accreditation standards necessary to remain in operation, including Baylor College of Medicine and UTHealth Science Center. The Library is required for accreditation by the accrediting bodies which oversee the educational curriculum. The Library must also meet additional library accreditation standards as determined by the LCME.

Accrediting bodies are the Liaison Committee for Medical Education (LCME) of the Association of American Medical Colleges (AAMC) and the American Medical Association (AMA); Southern Association of Colleges and Schools (SACS); Joint Commission on Accreditation of Healthcare Organizations (JCAHO).

The Library's annual budget for basic operations is derived from assessments from its eight governing and thirteen supporting institutions. Resources are accessible at the Library to non-member institutions and to the general public as well.

The TMC Library is organized as an extension under the Houston Academy of Medicine headquartered at 1515 Hermann Dr., and shares the same tax ID and reporting forms (990's). The TMC Library is located at 1133 John Freeman Blvd., situated between the two major medical schools of the TMC.

== Resources ==
The Library now holds approximately 332,000 print books and bound journals, delivers access to over 8,000 electronic journals, 11,000 electronic books, 240 free and proprietary databases, and 391 website portals. In FY 2012, over 3,100 gigabytes of data were electronically accessed by client institutions. The Library's service area extends to Houston, and Harris County, 18 counties in south Texas and a five-state region. Remote access via the Library's proxy server is available to authorized clientele logging in from locations worldwide. Under an agreement with the National Library of Medicine through their MedPrint program, the TMC Library has agreed to retain 37 journals as part of a national coordinated effort to preserve print materials. These journals equate to approximately 5,000 items to be stored in the Library's archives.

As Libraries around the country go digital, the TMC Library is relocating the large majority of its print materials to a repository co-sponsored by the University of Texas System and the Texas A&M System. This repository will act as the storage facility for the universities around the state of Texas and the TMC Library. Print material can be retrieved and shared among the various institutions when needed.

== John P. McGovern Historical Collections ==
The McGovern Center for Historical Collections (McGovern Center) within The TMC Library has notable historical collections on the foundations of the medical specialties, Texas medicine, rheumatology and North American public health. The archival collections focus on the development of the institutions and hospitals in the TMC in Houston, the careers of Houston physicians and biographical information on Texas physicians. In addition, the archive includes manuscript collections from American rheumatologists, the life sciences departments at the Johnson Space Center, historical manuscripts such as the McGovern Collection on the History of Medicine, the Menninger Collection of Psychiatry and Psychoanalysis and the Atomic Bomb Casualty Commission which recorded the after-effect of the bombs dropped in Hiroshima and Nagasaki,

Soon after his arrival in Houston, John P. McGovern, MD became one of the Library's most staunch supporters, annually supplying funds for the purchase of rare books. In 1977, the Library formed a new department in new quarters to collect historical materials and to enhance the rare book collections. In 1982, Dr. McGovern donated his personal collection of rare and historical book to the Library and several years later, donated his William Osler collection. In 1996 the Library's Board of Directors named the historical department in his honor and established the McGovern Endowment for the support of the department.

When the Menninger Clinic moved from Topeka, KS to Houston in the early 2000s, their rare book collection of more than 5,000 books was transferred to the Library.

In 2010, the McGovern Center acquired rare books about dentistry from the University of Texas Dental School at Houston. The majority of these books were collected by Dr. Thomas Dow in the early 20th century.

== Friends of the TMC Library ==
The mission of The Friends of The TMC Library is to support and promote the Library by:

- Increasing public awareness and use of the Library
- Supporting the Library's plan to collect, provide and conserve biomedical information
- Fundraising for the Library

Governed by a board of directors composed of community volunteers, the board has an outstanding representation of medical, academic, and business professionals. The Friends meet every other month throughout the academic year, September through May. Individuals, medical associations and societies, hospitals, corporations and foundations are invited to become members of the Friends organization.

The Friends of the TMC Library is a separate 501(c)3 not-for-profit organization.
