= Baylor Teen Health Clinic =

Coordinates: 29°42′19.3″N 95°20′55.1″W

The Baylor Teen Health Clinic
- Baylor College of Medicine

Geography
- Location: Houston, Texas, United States

Organization
- Care system: Non-profit
- Type: Family Planning and Teaching Clinic
- Affiliated university: Baylor College of Medicine

Services
- Standards: Family Planning, STD and HIV screening and treatment, prenatal/postpartum care, and fatherhood programs

Links
- Website: http://teenhealthclinic.org
- Lists: Hospitals in Texas

The Baylor Teen Health Clinic, also known as the Baylor College of Medicine Teen Health Clinic, is a network of nine clinics located in Houston, Texas. Established in 1968 as a maternity program for teens, the Baylor Teen Health Clinic now offers comprehensive reproductive health and family planning care at free or low-cost to males and females ages 13–25. The clinic also provides general health counseling as well as prenatal care and postpartum training to teenage boys and girls. Today the clinics welcome over 26,000 patient visits per year.

Primarily affiliated with Baylor College of Medicine, the Baylor Teen Health clinic is a non-profit clinic and research institute. The mission of the clinic is to provide health care equal to or better in quality than the private sector; to offer comprehensive care to the underserved population; and to educate both professionals and young people within the community to prevent risky behavior practices.

== History ==
The Baylor Teen Health Clinic traces its roots back to the Joyce Goldfarb Development Clinic, established in 1969 as a one-day per week maternity clinic located in the Jefferson Davis Hospital. Jefferson Davis Hospital was delivering over 10,000 babies per year, at a time when Texas had an infant mortality rate of over 20 deaths per 1,000 live births. When Dr. Goldfarb died unexpectedly in 1972, the clinic lost its Rockefeller Foundation grant funding. Dr. Peggy Smith was hired with the intention to shut down the clinic, but she decided to revive the clinic in 1971 and shifted its focus to reproductive care, serving males and females ages 13–22. Dr. Smith has since established outreach clinics beyond the Texas Medical Center in community locations and high school campuses with low-income, uninsured, indigent populations. The Teen Health Clinics serve neighborhoods known for high rates of infant mortality, sexuality transmitted infections and teen pregnancy.

In 1990, the Foundation for Teen Health, a 501(c)3 non-profit organization, was established to support the Baylor Teen Health Clinic. The objective of the Foundation for Teen Health is to garner funds from philanthropic donors and grants, and to increase community awareness of the clinics.

== Programs ==
=== Men's Program ===
Started in 1998, the young men's programs collaborated with the Texas Attorney General's Office and the Texas Department of State Health Services. Programs include the fatherhood Initiative Program and Specialized Male Clinic to serve the medical needs of young men between 17 and 25 years old. The programs play a part in the prevention of untimely pregnancies and sexually transmitted infections. Nuo grant enabled the Clinic offer assistance to young males with finding employment, taking the GED, obtaining vocational training and applying for college.

== Awards and honors ==
Through her work with the Baylor Teen Health Clinic, Dr. Peggy Smith has won various awards over the years.

Some awards and honors include:

- Child Abuse Prevention Council Heritage Award (1990)
- Good Samaritan Award (1996)
- Kezia DePelchin Award (2003)
  - see DePelchin Children's Center
- Kathryn S. Stream Award for Excellence in Women's Health Care (2010)
- The Texas Medical Association Foundation's John P. McGovern Champions of Health, Secondary Honor (2012)

== Research ==
As part of Baylor College of Medicine, Baylor Teen Health Clinic engages in academic research and has published over 130 articles in peer-reviewed journals ranging from Adolescence to the North American Journal of Psychology. In 1982, Dr. Smith was the first author of an article in USA Today entitled The Male Role in Teen Pregnancy. Dr. Smith has also published six books.

General topics for research include adolescent high-risk sexual behaviors, young fathers and male development programs, ethnicity and reproductive health, social determinants of health, and HIV/AIDS risk reduction. Some of the references:

Smith, P.B., Weinman, M., Mumford D.M. Social and affective factors associated with adolescent pregnancy. Journal of School Health, 90–93, February 1982.

Smith P.B., Weinman M., Johnson T.C., Wait R.B. Incentives and Their Influence on Appointment Compliance in a Teenage Family Planning Clinic. Journal of Adolescent Health Care 11:445-448, 1990.

Smith P.B., Weinman M. Cultural Implications for Public Health Policy for Pregnant Hispanic Adolescents. Health Values 19(1):3-9, 1995.

Smith P.B., Buzi R.S., Weinman M.L. Programs for Young Fathers: Essential Components and Evaluation Issues. North American Journal of Psychology 4(1): 81–92, 2002.

Smith P.B., Novello G., and Chacko M.R. Does Immediate Access to Birth Control Help Prevent Pregnancy? A Comparison on Onsite Provision Versus Off Campus Referral for Contraception at Two School-Based Clinics. Journal of Applied Research on Children: Informing Policy for Children at Risk, 2 (Issue 2 Teen Pregnancy) 2011.
