= Texas 2036 =

Nonprofit organization in Austin, United States

- Founder: Tom Luce
- Established: 2018
- Focus: Texas public policy
- President: David Leebron
- Address: 3963 Maple Ave, Ste 290; Dallas, TX 75219
- Location: Dallas, Texas
- Website: www.texas2036.org

Texas 2036 is a nonpartisan public policy think tank founded by Dallas attorney Tom Luce. Former U.S. Secretary of Education Margaret Spellings joined the organization in 2019 and served as president and CEO until 2023. Former president of Rice University David Leebron was selected to succeed Spellings. The organization has offices in Dallas and Austin, Texas.

The organization's name is based on the year of Texas's bicentennial. Texas 2036 focuses on education and workforce development; health; infrastructure; natural resources; justice and safety; and government performance.

== Activities ==
=== K12 education ===
In 2021, Texas 2036 and the Center for Houston's Future, an independent affiliate of the Greater Houston Partnership, released a report analyzing the impact of world oil prices on Texas public education funding. The report found that "reliance on the oil and gas industry could jeopardize up to $29 billion in public school funding over the next 15 years."

=== Health care ===
Texas 2036 developed an online tool for evaluating health care policy.

=== COVID-19 ===
Texas 2036 launched a website that tracked COVID-19 data.

=== Weather ===
In 2020, Texas 2036 funded a study on Texas weather patterns conducted by the Office of the Texas State Climatologist at Texas A&M University. An updated version of the study was released in October 2021.
