= Albert J. Rosenthal =

American legal scholar (1919–2010)

Albert Joseph Rosenthal (March 5, 1919 – March 17, 2010) was an American legal scholar and specialist in constitutional and environmental law. He joined Columbia Law School as a faculty member in 1964 and was appointed as the Maurice T. Moore Professor of Law in 1973. He served as dean of Columbia Law School from 1979 to 1984.

Rosenthal graduated from Harvard Law School in 1941.

== See also ==
- List of law clerks for the second seat of the Supreme Court of the United States

Academic offices
| Preceded by Michael I. Sovern | Dean of Columbia Law School; 1979–1984 | Succeeded by Benno C. Schmidt, Jr. |
