= BioScience Research Collaborative =

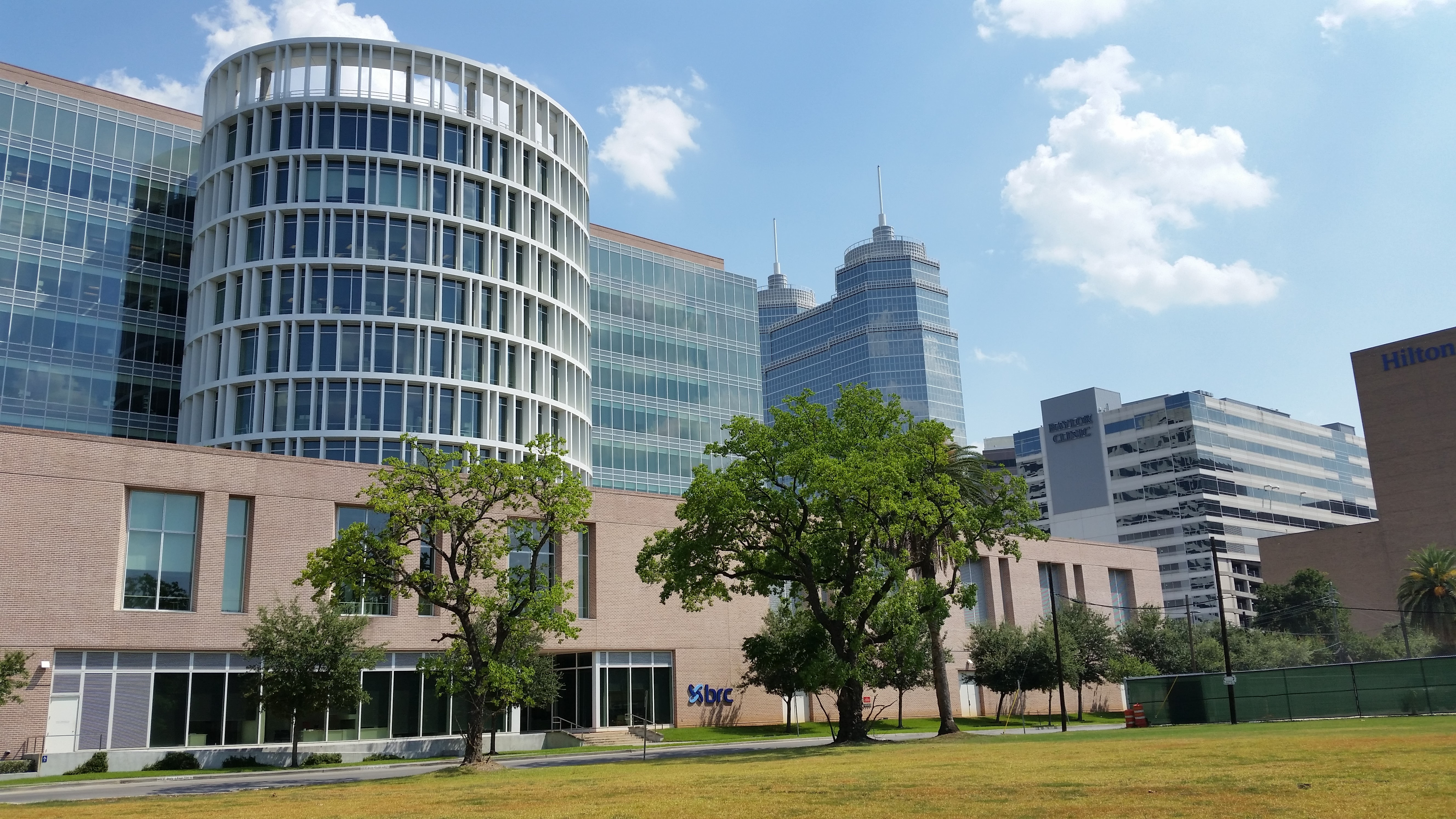

The BioScience Research Collaborative (BRC) is a collaborative life science research building in the Texas Medical Center in Houston, Texas. It is similar in concept to the Clark Center/BioX at Stanford University and the Broad Institute at MIT, among other collaborative centers. After Rice University President David Leebron announced his "Vision for the Second Century," including plans to increase research funding, build up existing programs, and increase collaboration between Rice and other entities, the construction of the BRC went forward with the intention of fostering collaboration with the neighboring Texas Medical Center. The BRC was built by Rice University, and officially opened in April 2010. A unique characteristic of the BRC as compared to other academic research institutes is the shared research space by faculty from Rice University and groups from neighboring Texas Medical Center institutions.

Collaborative research provides an advantage over traditional research in that multiple professors, or principal investigators, and their laboratory groups work together on different aspects of the same problem which usually results in finding a solution in a shorter amount of time.,

== History ==
The BRC was imagined by former Rice provost, Gene Levy, and former Rice President, Malcolm Gillis. It was designed by Skidmore, Owings & Merrill in San Francisco. The design was carefully intentional to incorporate collaborative space in as many ways as possible throughout the building, as can be seen on their project website. Construction was initiated in December 2006 and the researchers occupied the building in the summer of 2009.

== Tenants ==
In the nine years the building has been open, a number of Rice University and Texas Medical Center groups have made this space their research home. They include:

- National Space Biomedical Research Institute
- Rice University Department of Bioengineering
- Faculty from the following Rice University Departments: Chemistry, Biochemistry & Cell Biology, Physics & Astronomy, Electrical & Computer Engineering, Mechanical Engineering, and Psychology.
- Institute for Biosciences and Bioengineering
- Rice 360/Beyond Traditional Borders
- Rice University Public Art Program
- Medical Futures Laboratory
- Shared Equipment Authority
- Kinder Institute Urban Health Program
- National Space Biomedical Research Institute (NSBRI)
- Baylor College of Medicine Center for Space Medicine (CSM)
- Texas Children's Hospital (TCH)
- Houston Area Translational Research Consortium (HATRC)
- Gulf Coast Consortium (GCC)
- Electronic Health Research Institute (eHRI)
- Center for Theoretical Biological Physics
- Rice Neuroengineering Initiative

== Shared Instrumentation Facilities ==
The BRC houses numerous instrumentation facilities that are available to research groups from Rice, other universities and neighboring hospitals within the Texas Medical Center, and industry.
