= William J. McGill =

American academic (1922–1997)

William James McGill

16th President of Columbia University
- In office 1970–1980
- Preceded by: Andrew W. Cordier
- Succeeded by: Michael I. Sovern

3rd Chancellor of the University of California San Diego
- In office 1968–1970
- Preceded by: John Semple Galbraith
- Succeeded by: Herbert York

Personal details
- Born: 27 February 1922 New York City, New York, U.S.
- Died: 19 October 1997 (aged 75) La Jolla, California, U.S.
- Education: Fordham University (BA, MA); Harvard University (PhD)
- Profession: Psychologist

William James McGill (27 February 1922 – 19 October 1997) was an American psychologist, author, and academic administrator. He was the 16th president of Columbia University and the 3rd chancellor of the University of California San Diego.

== Biography ==
McGill was born in New York City to a musician and labor organizer. His father was "so embittered over the poor pay doled out to musicians" after a labor dispute that his father forbade McGill from learning how to play a musical instrument.

=== Education ===
He attended parochial Catholic schools and in 1939 began his college education at Fordham University, where he earned bachelor's and master's degrees in psychology. In 1953 he was awarded a doctorate in experimental psychology from Harvard University.

=== Career ===
McGill was an assistant professor at Massachusetts Institute of Technology until 1956 and then joined Columbia. He was chairman of the psychology department from 1961 to 1963 and left in 1965 to help found a psychology department at the University of California San Diego (UCSD). In 1968 he accepted the job of chancellor at UCSD, after the first five offered the position turned it down.

=== President of Columbia University ===
In 1970 he left California to become the president of Columbia University from 1970 to 1980.

In 1975, he was awarded an honorary Doctor of Humane Letters by Bard College.

From 1979 to 1981 McGill chaired Jimmy Carter's Presidential Commission for a National Agenda for the Eighties.

He served on the board of directors of AT&T, Occidental Petroleum and McGraw-Hill.

== Notes ==
Academic offices
Preceded by John Semple Galbraith	Chancellor of the University of California San Diego; 1968-1970	Succeeded by Herbert York
Preceded by Andrew W. Cordier	President of Columbia University; 1970–1980	Succeeded by Michael I. Sovern
