= Michael I. Sovern =

American legal scholar (1931–2020)

17th President of Columbia University
- In office 1980–1993
- Preceded by: William J. McGill
- Succeeded by: George Erik Rupp

Personal details
- Born: December 1, 1931 The Bronx, New York City, U.S.
- Died: January 20, 2020 (aged 88) Manhattan, New York City, U.S.
- Children: 4
- Education: Columbia University (BA, JD)

Michael Ira Sovern (December 1, 1931 – January 20, 2020) was an American legal scholar who served as the 17th president of Columbia University. Prior to his death, he served as the Chancellor Kent Professor of Law at Columbia Law School. He was a noted legal scholar of Labor Law and an expert in employment discrimination.

== Biography ==
Sovern was born in the Bronx to a dress businessman father and bookkeeper mother. He graduated from the Bronx High School of Science in 1949, then summa cum laude, from Columbia College in New York City in 1953, and Columbia Law School in 1955, receiving the prestigious John Ordronaux prize for having the highest academic average in his graduating class. Immediately after graduation, he joined the faculty at the University of Minnesota Law School and taught there until 1957.

He returned to Columbia as a visiting professor in 1957 and then joined the permanent faculty, becoming the youngest full professor in the university's history in 1960. He mediated for New York City in transit worker contract negotiations, as well as firefighter and police disputes. From 1962 to 1966, he was the Research Director concerning Legal Restraints on Racial Discrimination in Employment for the Twentieth Century Fund. He was a law consultant for Time magazine for fifteen years (1965–1980). Sovern served as Special Counsel to Governor Brendan Thomas Byrne of New Jersey from 1974 to 1977. He was the co-chairman of the Second Circuit commission on Reduction of Burdens and Costs in Civil Litigation from 1977 to 1980, chairman of the New York City Charter Revision Commission from 1982 to 1983 and chairman of the State-City Commission on Integrity in Government in 1986.

During the 1968 strife on Columbia's campus, he served as chairman of the faculty executive committee which was credited with easing tensions. Sovern became Dean of the Law School in 1970 and was named Executive Vice President of Academic Affairs and Provost in 1979. He became President of Columbia University in 1980. While President, he quadrupled Columbia's endowment, recruited many prominent faculty and presided over the opening of the university's main undergraduate division, Columbia College, to women students. Perhaps most importantly, he greatly improved the university's financial health by balancing its budget and introducing strict budgetary controls. He stepped down as president in 1993 and returned to the faculty at Columbia Law School.

He received honorary doctorates from Tel Aviv University, the University of Southern California and Columbia. A professorship in his name has been endowed at Columbia Law School, and the American Academy in Rome has established a fellowship in his honor.

== Civic activities ==
Outside of law and academia, Sovern was president of the Shubert Foundation and served on numerous boards, including Comcast Communications, the Shubert Organization, the Asian Cultural Council, and Atlantic Philanthropies. He served as chairman of Sotheby's Holdings, Inc. from 2000 to 2012, American Academy in Rome from 1994 to 2005, the Japan Society from 1993 to 2005, and the National Advisory Council for the Freedom Forum Media Studies Center. He was a member of the board of the NAACP Legal Defense Fund, the Kaiser Family Foundation, the Pulitzer Prizes, AT&T, Pfizer, Warner–Lambert and JP Morgan Chase, among others.

He was a member of the: American Bar Association, Council on Foreign Relations, Bar Association of the City of New York, American Philosophical Society, American Law Institute, and the American Academy of Arts and Sciences.

He was also a founding member of the board of directors of Mobilization for Youth's Legal Services Unit; the Mexican-American Legal Defense Fund; the Puerto Rican Legal Defense and Education Fund; Helsinki Watch and AMFAR, the American Foundation for AIDS Research.

== Personal life ==
Sovern was married four times: to the former Lenore Goodman in 1953, to the former Eleanor Leen in 1963, to the former Joan Rosenthal Wit in 1974, and finally to Dr. Patricia Margaret Walsh in 1995. His first and second marriages ended in divorce, and the third when Joan Sovern died of cancer in 1993. Sovern was the father of two daughters, Elizabeth and Julie, and two sons, Jeff and Douglas. Jeff Sovern is a professor of law at St. John's University and a graduate of Columbia University and Columbia Law School. Doug Sovern was an award-winning news reporter for KCBS Radio in San Francisco and maintained the sovernnation political blog. He was a graduate of Brown University. He was also a musician, playing bass in the Eyewitness Blues Band. Elizabeth Sovern, a graduate of Barnard College, teaches middle school in Westchester, New York, and Julie Sovern, also a graduate of Columbia Law School, was an Assistant General Counsel at Wells Fargo & Company, in Charlotte, NC. Sovern died on January 20, 2020, at the age of 88 from amyloid cardiomyopathy.

== Honors ==
Sovern received numerous awards and distinctions, including the Commendatore Order of Merit from the government of Italy and the Order of the Rising Sun, Gold and Silver Star from Japan. He was a recipient of the Alexander Hamilton medal from Columbia College in 1993. That year, he also won the Citizens Union Civil Leadership Award. He has also received the Town Hall Friend of the Arts Award.

- Order of the Rising Sun, Gold and Silver Star, 2003 (Japan).

== Books authored ==
- Legal Restraints on Racial Discrimination in Employment (1966)
- Cases and Materials on Law and Poverty (1969)
- Of Boundless Domains (1994)
- An Improbable Life: My Sixty Years at Columbia and Other Adventures (2014)

== Notes ==
Academic offices
Preceded by William Clements Warren	Dean of Columbia Law School; 1970–1979	Succeeded by Albert J. Rosenthal
Preceded by William J. McGill	President of Columbia University; 1980–1993	Succeeded by George Erik Rupp
