= George Erik Rupp =

American academic and theologian (born 1942)

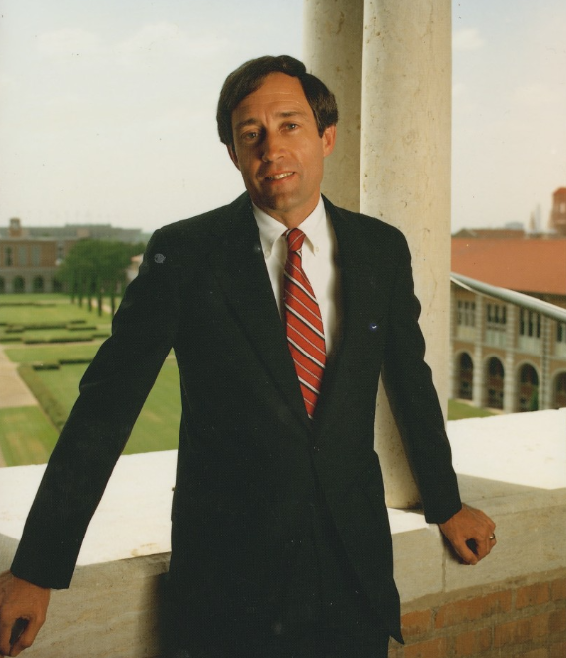
- Rupp in 1990

President of the International Rescue Committee
- In office 2003–2013
- Preceded by: Reynold Levy
- Succeeded by: David Miliband

18th President of Columbia University
- In office 1993–2002
- Preceded by: Michael I. Sovern
- Succeeded by: Lee Bollinger

5th President of Rice University
- In office 1985–1993
- Preceded by: Norman Hackerman
- Succeeded by: S. Malcolm Gillis

Personal details
- Born: September 22, 1942 (age 84) Summit, New Jersey
- Spouse: Nancy Rupp
- Education: Princeton University (BA); Yale University (BDiv); Harvard University (PhD)

Academic background
- Thesis: The cross and "unbelief": Christology in the context of religious pluralism (1972)

Academic work
- Discipline: Theology
- Institutions: University of Redlands; Harvard University; University of Wisconsin–Green Bay; Rice University

George Erik Rupp (born September 22, 1942, in Summit, NJ, US) is an American educator and theologian, who served successively as president of Rice University, Columbia University, and the International Rescue Committee.

== Biography ==
Rupp was born in Summit, New Jersey, the son of German immigrant parents, and was raised in Springfield Township, Union County, New Jersey. He studied at LMU Munich in Germany before graduating from Princeton University with an A.B. in English in 1964 after completing a senior thesis titled "A Theatre of Ideas: Studies in Mid-Twentieth Century German and English Drama." He then received a Bachelor of Divinity degree from Yale Divinity School and, after studying for a year in Sri Lanka, a Ph.D. in religion from Harvard University. He is an ordained Presbyterian minister, but mostly retired from preaching by the mid-1980s.

He was faculty fellow in religion and then Vice Chancellor of Johnston College in the University of Redlands in Redlands, California. Rupp left Redlands to return to Harvard as Assistant and then Associate Professor of Theology in the Divinity School. He left Harvard to become Professor of Humanistic Studies and Dean of Academic Affairs at the University of Wisconsin–Green Bay in 1977, where he remained until 1979.

Rupp was the John Lord O'Brian Professor of Divinity and dean of the Harvard Divinity School from 1979 to 1985. Under his leadership, the curriculum of the school was revised to address more directly the pluralistic character of contemporary religious life. Further developments included new programs in women's studies and religion, Jewish-Christian relations, and religion and medicine.

He was President of Rice University from 1985 to 1993, where in the course of his eight years applications for admission almost tripled, federal research support more than doubled, and the value of the Rice endowment increased by more than $500 million to $1.25 billion.

He became president of Columbia in 1993. During his nine-year tenure, he focused on enhancing undergraduate education, on strengthening the relationship of the campus to surrounding communities and New York City as a whole, and on increasing the university's international orientation. At the same time, he completed both a financial restructuring of the university and a $2.84 billion fundraising campaign that achieved eight successive records in dollars raised.

As the IRC's chief executive officer from 2003 to 2013, Rupp oversaw the agency's relief and rehabilitation operations in 25 countries and its refugee resettlement and assistance programs throughout the United States. In addition, he led the IRC's advocacy efforts in Washington, D.C., Geneva, Brussels, and other capitals on behalf of the world's most vulnerable people. His responsibilities regularly took him to IRC program sites in Africa, Asia, and Europe. During his time as president of the IRC, the budget tripled in size.

On March 26, 2013, The Daily Mirror reported that former UK Foreign Secretary David Miliband would be stepping down from the UK Parliament to succeed Rupp as CEO of the IRC.

In July 2013, Rupp became a senior fellow at the Carnegie Council for Ethics in International Affairs, and in April 2015 he was elected chair of the International Baccalaureate Organization. He has remained actively involved with Columbia University in his post-presidency as a distinguished visiting scholar at the Institute for Religion, Culture, and Public Life; as of 2015, he also served as an adjunct professor of comparative religion, public health, and international affairs.

He is the author numerous articles, opinion pieces, and book chapters and also of seven books:

- Christologies and Cultures: Toward a Typology of Religious Worldviews
- Beyond Existentialism and Zen: Religion in a Pluralistic World
- Culture Protestantism': German Liberal Theology at the Turn of the 20th Century
- Commitment and Community
- Globalization Challenged: Conviction, Conflict, Community
- Beyond Individualism: The Challenge of Inclusive Communities
- The Heart of Community: A Family Journey

George and his wife Nancy are the parents of two adult daughters who are teaching and writing, one with scholarly expertise in East Asia and the other a specialist in African studies, and are the grandparents of six children: four boys and two girls.

Rupp was chosen as Rice University's commencement speaker for 2008.

Academic offices
| Preceded by Norman Hackerman | 5th President of Rice University; 1985–1993 | Succeeded by S. Malcolm Gillis |
| Preceded by Michael I. Sovern | 18th President of Columbia University; 1993–2002 | Succeeded by Lee Bollinger |
