= Andrew W. Cordier =

American political scientist (1901–1975)

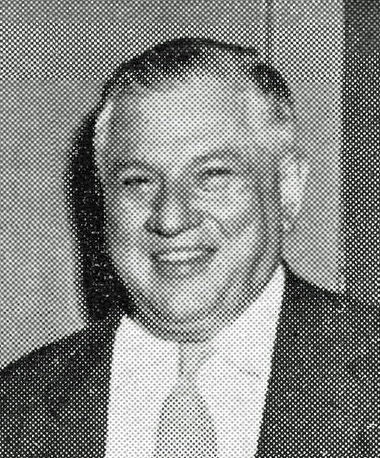

15th President of Columbia University
- In office 1968–1970
- Preceded by: Grayson L. Kirk
- Succeeded by: William J. McGill

Personal details
- Born: March 1, 1901; Canton, Ohio, US
- Died: July 11, 1975 (aged 74); Manhasset, New York, US
- Education: Manchester University; University of Chicago

Andrew Wellington Cordier (March 1, 1901 – July 11, 1975) was a United Nations official and President of Columbia University.

== Early life and education ==
Cordier was born on a farm near Canton, Ohio, and attended high school in Hartville, Ohio, where he became quarterback of the football team and valedictorian of his graduating class. He graduated in 1922 from Manchester University in Indiana and went on to earn a Ph.D. in medieval history at the University of Chicago in 1927 with a dissertation on the reconstruction of southern France after the Albigensian Crusades. He married the former Dorothy Butterbaugh in 1924. He studied at the Graduate Institute of International Studies in Switzerland in 1930–1931 where he made surveys of the situations in the Sudetenland, Danzig, and the Chaco War.

== Career ==
=== Academia ===
From 1927 to 1944, Cordier was a professor at his alma mater Manchester College and chair of the department of history and political science, also teaching at Indiana University extension.

=== State Department ===
He became an international security advisor at the U.S. State Department in 1944 and was part of the U.S. delegation to the San Francisco Conference. The State Department sent him to London in 1945 to help organize the United Nations.

=== United Nations ===
From 1946 to 1961, Cordier served as Undersecretary in Charge of General Assembly and Related Affairs and took on assignments as a special representative of the Secretary General in the Korean War and the Suez Canal and Congo crises. Cordier was dubbed a "demon parliamentarian" for his ability to cite the specific rules governing matters of procedure on the spot.

Cordier is noted for convincing Dean Rusk and Ambassador Yakov Malik to meet in the basement of his Great Neck, New York home to discuss how to lessen U.S.–Soviet tensions.

Cordier was considered responsible for facilitating the first US-supported coup against Congo Prime Minister Patrice Lumumba by closing airports and radio stations to him while his opponents had such facilities available to them. Both Belgian and UN documents show Cordier as doing this purposefully.

In 1962, Cordier resigned from his post after the Soviets criticized him for usurping too many of the Secretary General's responsibilities after the death of Dag Hammarskjöld.

=== Columbia University ===
After leaving the United Nations, Cordier joined Columbia University as the Dean of the School of International Affairs (SIA), serving in that role from 1962 to 1972.

When Grayson L. Kirk resigned in 1968, Cordier assumed the presidency on an interim basis while remaining Dean of SIA. The trustees were sufficiently pleased with his work that they gave him the permanent title in 1969; Cordier accepted on the condition that the search for a new president continue. He was president until 1970, when he was succeeded by William J. McGill. Cordier continued as Dean of SIA after leaving the president's office.

As president he enjoyed moderate success in dealing with student unrest and unhappiness by maintaining an open-door policy, attending student rallies sponsored by Students for a Restructured University (SRU) which was led by Neal H. Hurwitz, and speaking out against U.S. involvement in Vietnam.

Columbia College awarded him its highest honor, the Alexander Hamilton Medal, in 1970.

== Later years ==
In 1975, at the age of 74, Cordier died of cirrhosis of the liver at the Manhasset Medical Center on Long Island.

His undergraduate alma mater, Manchester University, located in North Manchester, Indiana named its 1100-seat auditorium in his honor.

== Notes ==
Academic offices
Preceded by Grayson L. Kirk	President of Columbia University; 1968–1970	Succeeded by William J. McGill
