= S. Malcolm Gillis =

American academic (1940–2015)

Stephen Malcolm Gillis
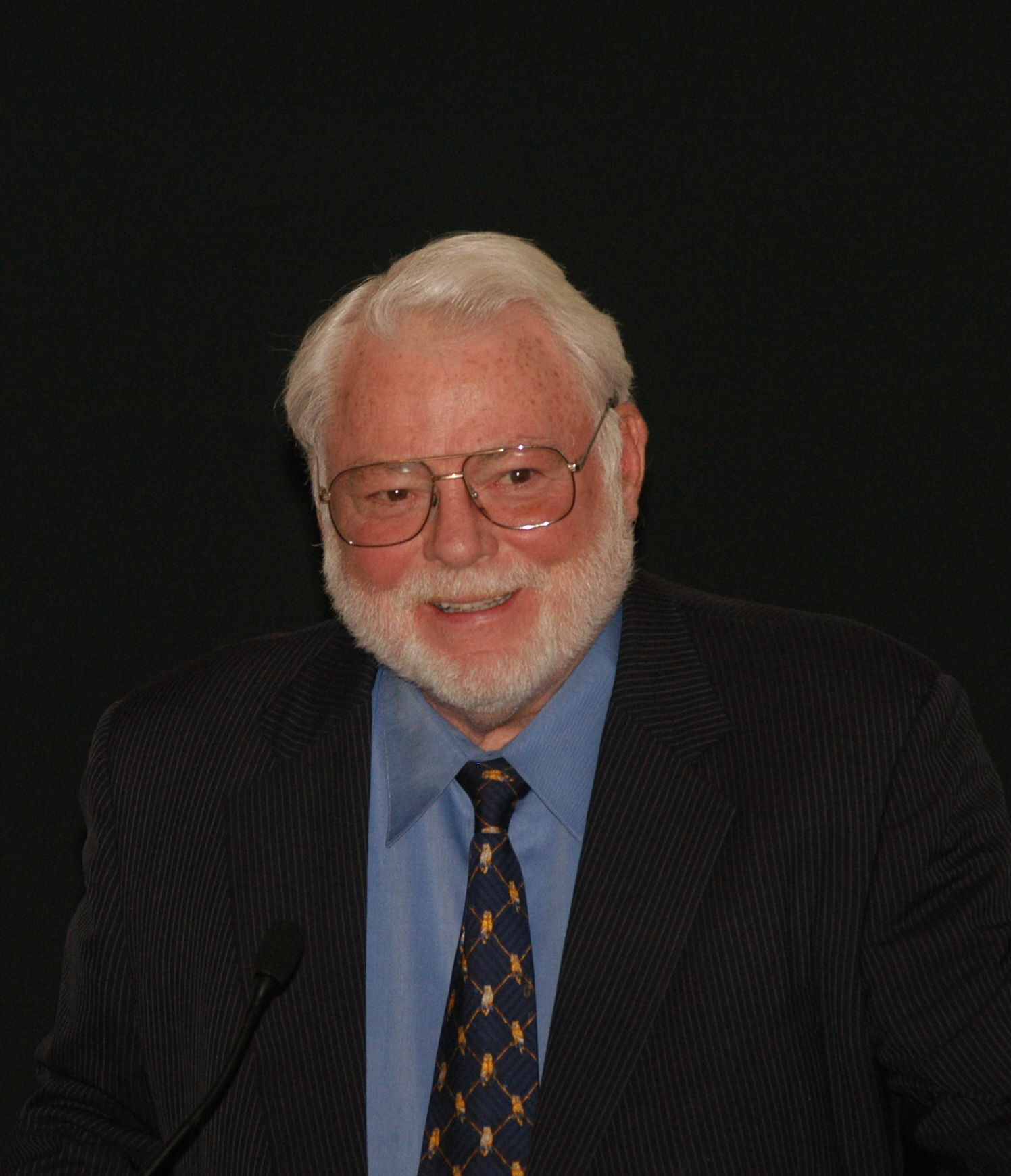

6th President of Rice University
- In office 1993–2004
- Preceded by: George Erik Rupp
- Succeeded by: David Leebron

Personal details
- Born: December 28, 1940 Dothan, Alabama, U.S.
- Died: October 4, 2015 (aged 74) Houston, Texas, U.S.
- Spouse: Elizabeth Gillis
- Education: University of Florida (BA, MA); University of Illinois Urbana-Champaign (PhD)

Stephen Malcolm Gillis (December 28, 1940 – October 4, 2015) was an American academic. He served as the sixth president of Rice University in Houston, Texas, from 1993 until 2004. He was University Professor and Ervin Kenneth Zingler Professor of Economics at Rice.

== Biography ==
=== Education ===
Gillis received a Bachelor of Arts in 1962 and a Master of Arts in 1963 from the University of Florida. Later, he received a Doctor of Philosophy from the University of Illinois Urbana-Champaign in 1968. While he was a student at Florida, he became a member of the Phi Delta Theta fraternity.

=== Career ===
Prior to serving as Rice University president, Gillis was Dean of the Faculty of Arts and Sciences at Duke University (1991–1993) and Dean of the Graduate School and Vice Provost for Academic Affairs at Duke (1986–1991).

Gillis helped to found Jacobs University Bremen (initially International University Bremen) and served on the board of governors. He was one of four Co-Chairmen of Pyongyang University of Science and Technology. He is also a founding member of TanTao University in Vietnam. He sat on the Board of Directors of CRDF Global and Halliburton.

Gillis died from cancer on October 4, 2015.

Academic offices
Preceded by George Erik Rupp	President of Rice University; 1993–2004	Succeeded by David Leebron
