= Naomi C. Broering =

American medical librarian

- Died: January 11, 2023; La Jolla, CA

Academic background
- Education: California State University, Long Beach
- Alma mater: University of California, Los Angeles

Academic work
- Discipline: Library sciences
- Sub-discipline: Medical libraries
- Institutions: Pacific College of Health and Science, Medical Library Association, Georgetown University School of Medicine

Naomi C. Broering was a medical librarian, elected fellow of the American College of Medical Informatics, past president of the Medical Library Association, and past Dean of Libraries at the Pacific College of Health and Science.

== Education ==
She received a bachelor's degree in social sciences and a master's degree in history at California State University at Long Beach. Broering went on to receive a master's degree in Library and Information Science, and NIH/NLM Fellowship in medical librarianship and complete all courses toward a doctorate in history at the University of California, Los Angeles (UCLA).

== Career ==
Broering was director of the Dahlgren Memorial Library at Georgetown University School of Medicine from 1978 to 1996. From 1996 to 1997 she served as president of the Medical Library Association, and is reckoned as the first MLA president of Hispanic heritage. She endowed the Naomi C. Broering Hispanic Heritage Grant "on the occasion of her forty-five years as a member of MLA".

She was the 21st editor of the Bulletin of the Medical Library Association. By 1993, her work had contributed to developing computer systems for libraries and to medical information technology.

== Honors and awards ==
- MLA fellow 1981
- MLA Thomson Scientific/Frank Bradway Rogers Information Advancement Award, 1986
- first recipient of the NLM Integrated Advanced Information Management Systems (IAIMS) grant
- Fellow, American College of Medical Informatics, 1989
- Winifred Sewell Prize for Innovation in Information Technologies from the Special Libraries Association Biomedical & Life Sciences Division, 1999
- Marcia C. Noyes Award, 2003

== Selected publications ==
- editor, High-Performance Medical Libraries: Advances in Information Management for the Virtual Era, ISBN 0-88736-878-6
- Broering N. C. "Medical libraries: laws and legislation", (Wedgeworth R, ed. ) ALA world encyclopedia of Library and information services, Chicago, IL: American Library Association, 1980. p, 352.
