= Texas Medical Center =

- Neighborhood
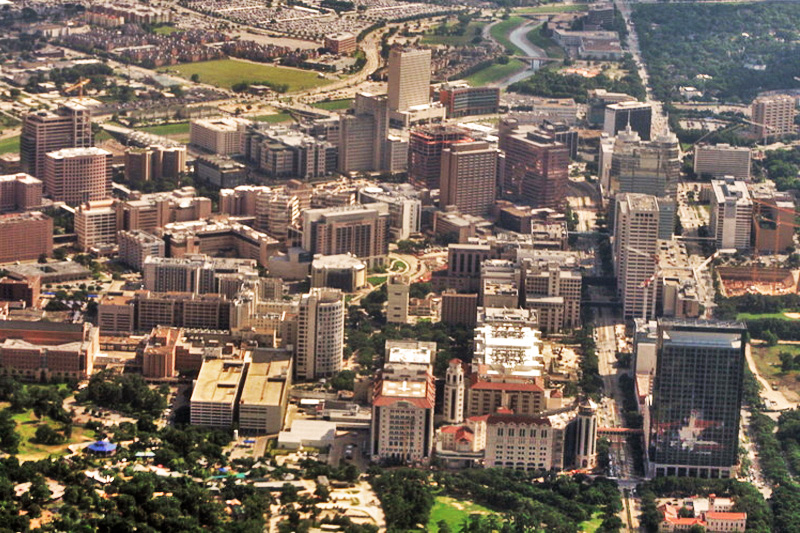
- Aerial view of the Texas Medical Center's main campus looking south from Hermann Park. Brays Bayou is visible at the top of the image.
- Interactive map of Texas Medical Center
- Coordinates: 29.7061789°N 95.408837°W
- Country: United States
- State: Texas
- County: Harris
- City: Houston
- Institution created: 1945

Government
  - Type: Non-profit corporation
  - Body: Texas Medical Center Corporation

Area
  - Total: 4.93 sq mi (12.8 km^{2})
  - TMC campus: 2.10 sq mi (5.4 km^{2})

Population (2012)
  - Total: 20,866
  - Density: 4,230/sq mi (1,630/km^{2})
- Figures for the combined Medical Center / Astrodome super neighborhood.
- ZIP Code: 77030
- Area codes: 281, 346, 713, 832
- Website: tmc.edu

The Texas Medical Center (TMC) is a neighborhood in south-central Houston, Texas, United States. It is immediately south of the Museum District and west of Texas State Highway 288.

Over 60 medical institutions, largely concentrated in a triangular area between Brays Bayou, Rice University, and Hermann Park, are members of the Texas Medical Center Corporation—a non-profit umbrella organization—which constitutes the largest medical center and life science destination in the world. As the world's largest medical center, it is also nicknamed as the "Medical Mini-City". The TMC has the world's highest density of clinical facilities for patient care, basic biomedical sciences, and translational research. The neighborhood is 2.1-square-mile (5.4 km^{2}).

The Texas Medical Center employs over 106,000 people, hosts 10 million patient encounters annually, and has a gross domestic product of US$25 billion. Over the decades, the TMC has expanded south of Brays Bayou toward NRG Park and the organization has developed plans for a new "innovation campus" south of the river. The 4.93-square-mile (12.8 km^{2}) Medical Center / Astrodome area, highly populated with medical workers, is home to over 20,000 people.

The TMC is served by the METRORail Red Line, a north-south light rail route which connects the district to Downtown Houston and NRG Park.

== Overview ==
Texas Medical Center Corporation
- Formation: 1945
- Type: Non-profit
- Location: Houston, Texas, U.S.
- President and Chief Executive Officer: William F. McKeon
- Volunteers: 12,000
- Website: www.tmc.edu

The Texas Medical Center contains 54 medicine-related institutions, with 21 hospitals and eight specialty institutions, eight academic and research institutions, four medical schools, seven nursing schools, three public health organizations, two pharmacy schools and a dental school. All 54 institutions are non-profit. Among the affiliated medical schools are McGovern Medical School, Baylor College of Medicine, University of Texas Medical Branch at Galveston and Texas A&M College of Medicine. Some member institutions are located outside the city of Houston.

In 2016, more heart surgeries were performed at the Texas Medical Center than anywhere else in the world with 13,600 heart surgeries annually. 180,000 annual surgeries were performed. The TMC performed one surgery every three minutes. Over 25,000 babies were delivered each year, more than one baby every 20 minutes. The Texas Medical Center offered over 9,200 total patient beds.

The Center receives an average of 3,300 patient visits a day, and over eight million annual patient visits, including over 18,000 international patients. The TMC has over 750,000 ER visitors each year. In 2011, the center employed over 106,000 people, including 20,000 physicians, scientists, researchers and other advanced degree professionals in the life sciences. The TMC has over 160,000 visitors each day.

The Texas Medical Center houses the world's largest children's hospital (Texas Children's Hospital), as well as the world's largest cancer hospital (MD Anderson Cancer Center).

== History ==
=== Founding and early years ===
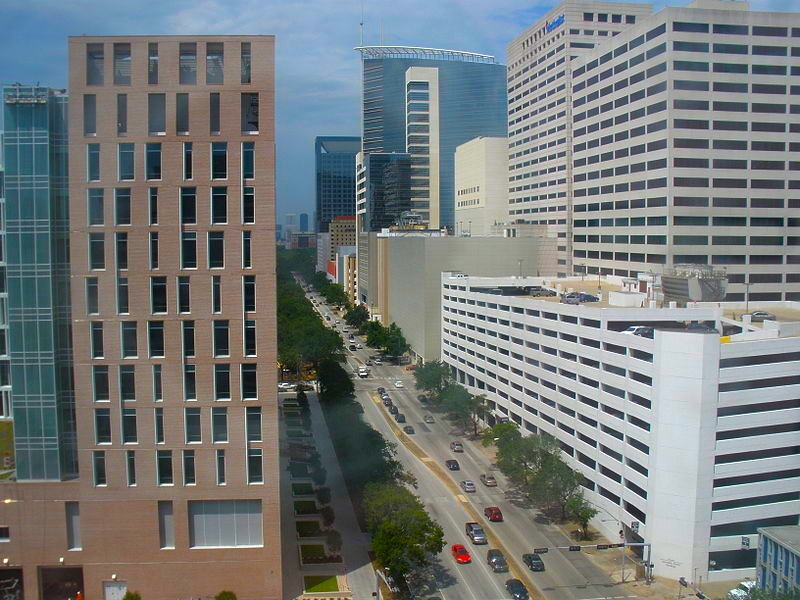
Main Street within the Texas Medical Center, viewed from the Baylor College of Medicine toward Downtown Houston. On the left is BioScience Research Collaborative

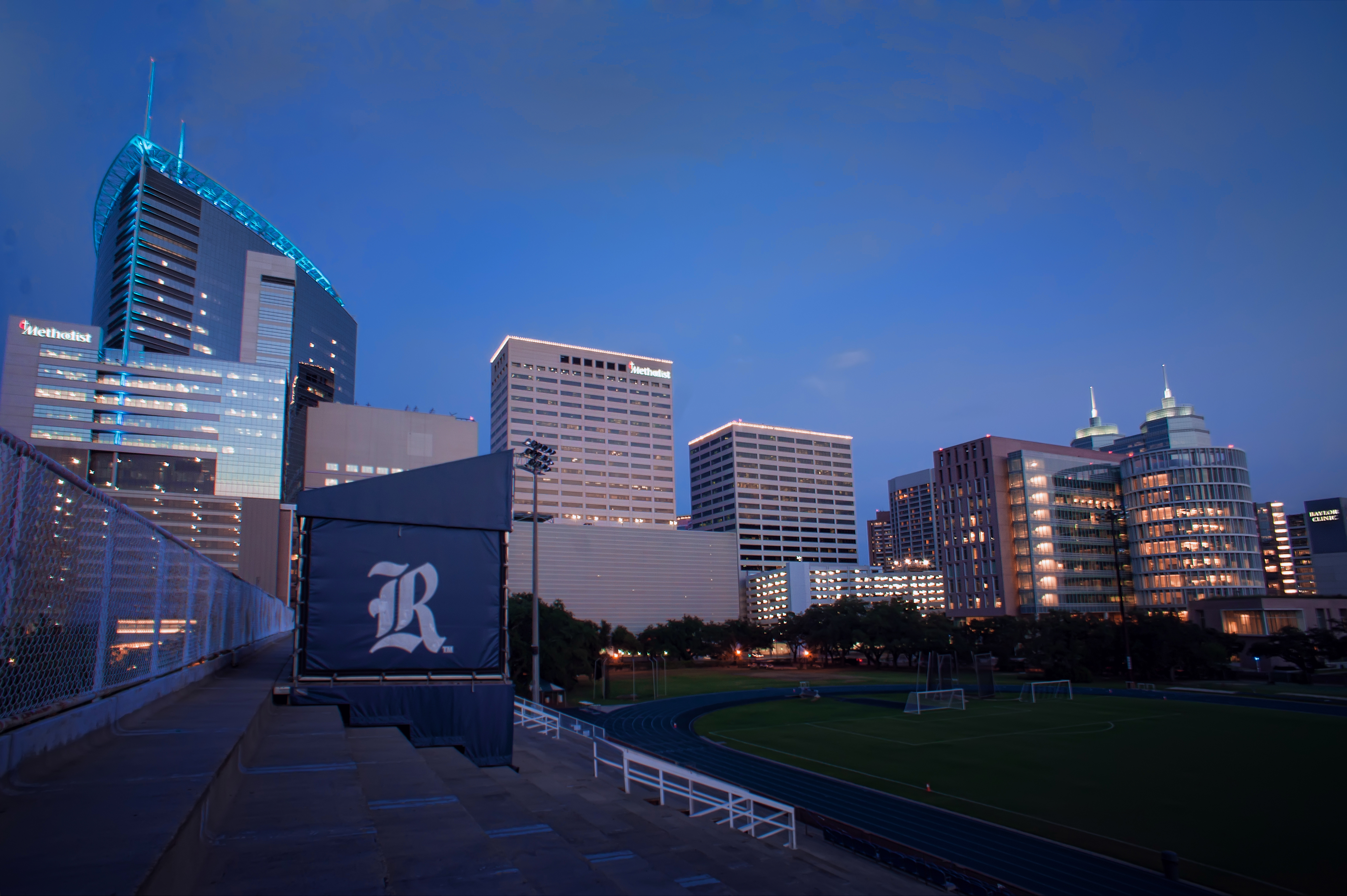
Texas Medical Center at twilight, viewed from Rice University campus

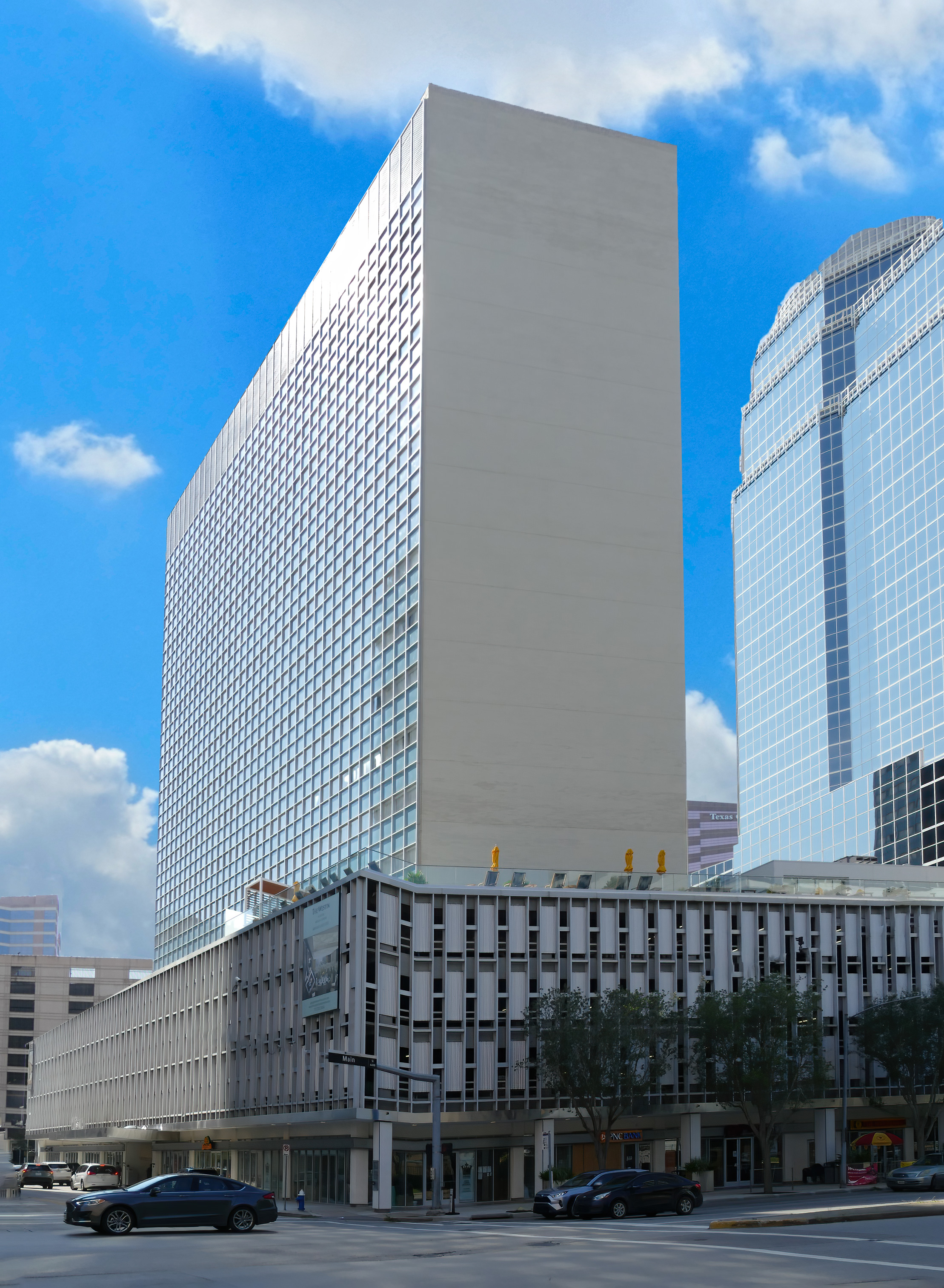
Medical Towers in Houston

Texas Medical Center was established in 1945, in part by funds endowed to the M.D. Anderson Foundation by businessman Monroe Dunaway Anderson. The fund's first gift was a check of $1,000 to the Junior League Eye Fund for eyeglasses. In 1941, the Texas State Legislature granted funds to the University of Texas for the purpose of starting a cancer research hospital. The M.D. Anderson Foundation matched the state's gift to the university by supplying funds and land on the condition that the hospital be established in Houston and named after its founder.

President Franklin D. Roosevelt approved the purchase of 118 acres (0.48 km^{2}) from the estate of local entrepreneur George Hermann (namesake of Hermann Park) in 1944 for the construction of a 1,000-bed naval hospital in Houston. The hospital, later renamed the Michael E. DeBakey Veterans Affairs Medical Center, opened in 1946 and became a teaching facility for Baylor College of Medicine. In 1946, several projects were approved for inclusion in the Texas Medical Center including:

- Memorial Hermann–Texas Medical Center, built in the 1920s
- Shriners Hospitals for Children
- Baylor St. Luke's Medical Center, Houston Methodist Hospital
- The Texas Medical Center Library

M.D. Anderson Hospital for Cancer Research of the University of Texas began construction in 1953. Texas Children's Hospital admitted its first patient in 1954.

During the late 1950s, the Texas Institute for Rehabilitation and Research opened. The University of Texas M.D. Anderson Hospital and Tumor Institute at Houston added the Gimbel Research Wing. Texas Woman's University Nursing Program began instruction.

In 1962, the Texas Heart Institute was chartered and became affiliated with Baylor St. Luke's Medical Center (known then as St. Luke's Episcopal Hospital) and Texas Children's Hospital. Ben Taub General Hospital of the Harris Health System (known then as Harris County Hospital District) opened in 1963.

The TMC Library provides access to thousands of current digital books and journals and its John P. McGovern Historical Collections and Research Center houses rare medical books dating back to the 1500s, historical manuscripts such as the McGovern Collection on the History of Medicine, the Menninger Collection of Psychiatry and Psychoanalysis, and the Atomic Bomb Casualty Commission which recorded the aftereffects of the atomic bombings of Hiroshima and Nagasaki.

=== Recent developments ===
In 1993, The University of Texas M.D. Anderson Cancer Center began a $248.6-million expansion project which constructed an inpatient pavilion with 512 beds, two research buildings, an outpatient clinic building, a faculty office building, and a patient-family hotel. From 2005 to present, the George and Cynthia Mitchell Basic Sciences Research Building, the Ambulatory Clinical Building, the Cancer Prevention Center and a new research building on the South Campus opened. The Proton Therapy Center, the largest facility in the United States where proton therapy is used to treat cancer, opened in July 2006.

In 2001, the Texas Medical Center was devastated by Tropical Storm Allison, which flooded basements and the first floors with 18 inches of water. This resulted in retrofitting of storm doors and barriers to prevent future flooding.

The Memorial Hermann Healthcare System constructed the six-floor, 165,000-square-foot (15,300 m^{2}) Memorial Hermann Heart & Vascular Institute. Also recently completed around 2006 was the 30-story Memorial Hermann Medical Plaza, which is now the largest medical office building in the Texas Medical Center. At night, it became recognizable by its unique rainbow lantern. The construction was part of the system's citywide "Century Project" initiative.

In 2005, Baylor College of Medicine opened the Baylor Clinic.

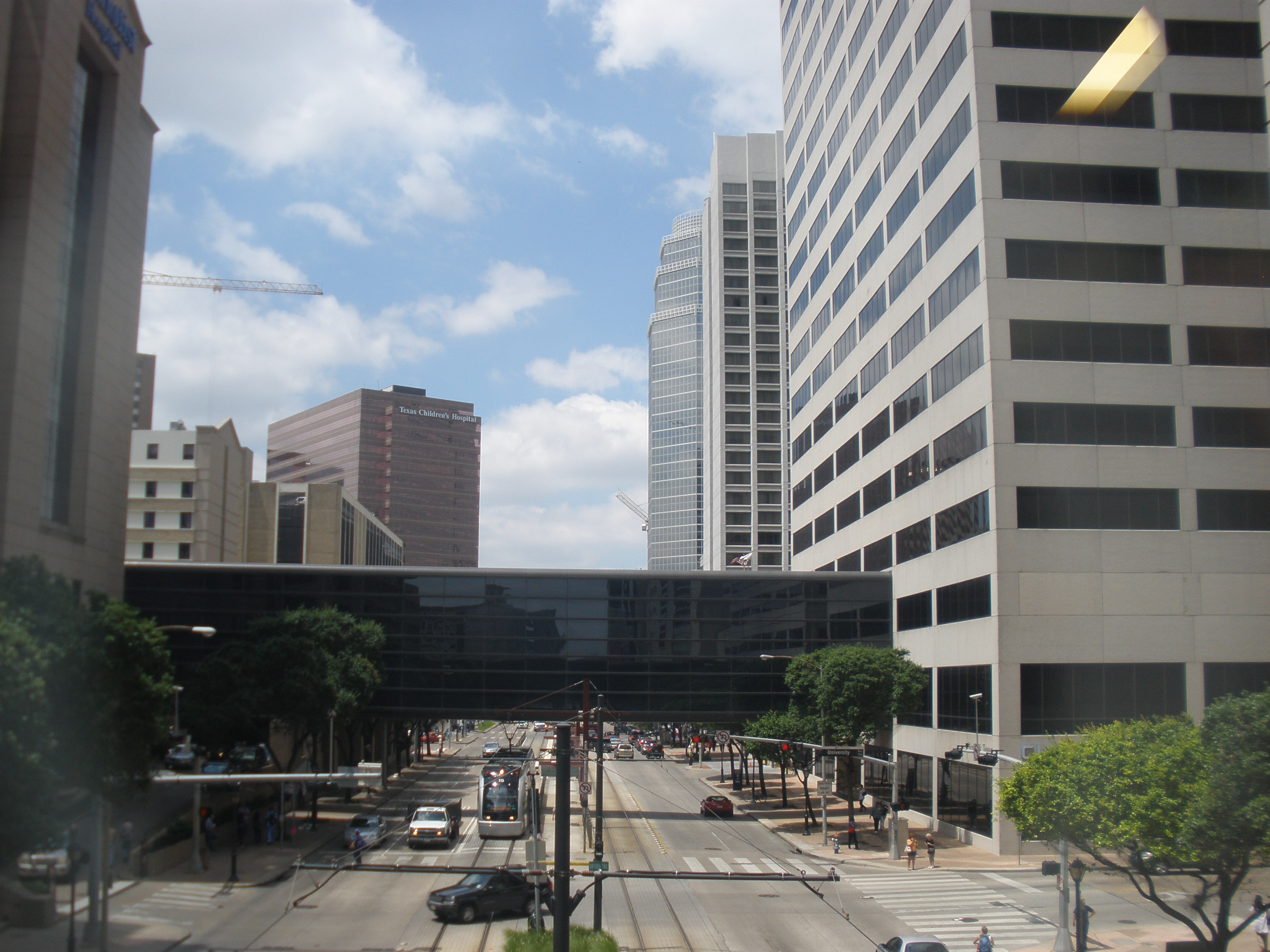
Fannin Street within the Texas Medical Center, viewed from the crosswalk between two buildings of the Houston Methodist hospital

The Texas Children's Hospital announced the largest investment and program expansion ever by a single pediatric organization. The $1.5 billion, four-year initiative was targeted for completion in 2010 and focused on research and accessibility. Major projects included the development of the neurological research institute ($215 million), the formation of a maternity center ($575 million), and the expansion of existing research facilities ($120 million). Texas Children's was undertaking the development of one of the largest pediatric hospitals in a suburban setting ($220 million). The remainder of the expenditures were earmarked for new equipment and information systems.

In 2010, the University of Texas Medical Branch at Galveston, including the John Sealy Hospital, became the 49th member of the Texas Medical Center and the first member-institution located outside the City of Houston.

Texas Medical Center–West Campus, serving residents of greater west Houston and adjacent areas, opened in January, 2011. Representing an initial investment of more than half a billion dollars, and almost 1.2 million square feet of healthcare development, the first two facilities to open in the new campus were the Texas Children’s Hospital and The Houston Methodist West Hospital. Texas Children’s West Campus is among the nation’s largest suburban pediatric hospitals.

In 2012, Texas Medical Center added the Shriners Hospitals for Children in Galveston, which treats pediatric trauma burns, as its 50th member institution.

In 2016, Texas Medical Center added San José Clinic, the community's leading charity care clinic, as a member institution. Denise Castillo-Rhodes, executive vice president and chief financial officer of the Texas Medical Center, as well as a volunteer for San José Clinic noted when it became a member of TMC: "San José Clinic serves a very important role in our community. Thus, it is a natural next step for the Clinic to join the Texas Medical Center as its newest member, as it continues to grow and provide extraordinary healthcare and education at affordable prices.".

In 2020, Texas A&M announced plans to build a $550 million complex on the southern side of the TMC including academic, medical office, and housing buildings.

On June 24, 2020, the Texas Medical Center released data showing a 97% capacity in its ICU facilities due to the COVID-19 crisis. The Texas Medical Center has been a forefront of helping COVID-19 victims in Houston during the pandemic.

== Member Institutions ==
The Texas Medical Center (TMC) in Houston is the largest medical complex in the world, comprising 21 hospitals, 8 specialty institutions, 8 academic and research institutions, 4 medical schools, 3 nursing schools, 2 pharmacy schools, and 1 dental school. Additionally, The Texas Medical Center (TMC) hosts over 400 biotech and healthcare startups, alongside numerous major pharmaceutical companies, making it a leading hub for medical innovation.

=== Hospitals ===
1. Baylor St. Luke's Medical Center
2. Ben Taub General Hospital
3. Children's Memorial Hermann Hospital
4. Harris Health System
5. Houston Hospice
6. Houston Methodist Hospital
7. Houston Methodist Sugar Land Hospital
8. Houston Methodist West Hospital
9. John Sealy Hospital
10. Lyndon B. Johnson General Hospital
11. Memorial Hermann-Texas Medical Center
12. Michael E. DeBakey Veterans Affairs Medical Center
13. Rebecca Sealy Hospital
14. St. Dominic Village
15. San Jose Clinic

==== Specialty institutions not listed above ====
1. DePelchin Children's Center
2. Institute for Spirituality and Health
3. Shriners Hospitals for Children
4. Texas Children's Hospital (including Texas Children's Cancer Center)
5. Texas Heart Institute
6. The Menninger Clinic
7. The University of Texas M. D. Anderson Cancer Center
8. TIRR Memorial Hermann

=== Academic and research institutions ===
1. University of Texas Health Science Center at Houston
2. Institute of Biosciences and Technology (Texas A&M Health Science Center)
3. BioScience Research Collaborative (Rice University)
4. MD Anderson Cancer Center (University of Texas)
5. Institute of Health Sciences (Texas Woman's University)
6. Houston Methodist Research Institute

==== Medical schools ====
1. Baylor College of Medicine
2. McGovern Medical School
3. Texas A&M School of Medicine
4. University of Houston College of Medicine
5. University of Texas Medical Branch at Galveston

==== Nursing schools ====
1. Prairie View A&M College of Nursing
2. Texas Woman's University College of Nursing
3. Jane and Robert Cizik School of Nursing
4. Coleman College for Health Sciences

==== Pharmacy schools ====
1. University of Houston College of Pharmacy
2. Texas Southern University College of Pharmacy and Health Sciences

==== Dental school ====
1. UTHealth School of Dentistry

== Cityscape and infrastructure ==
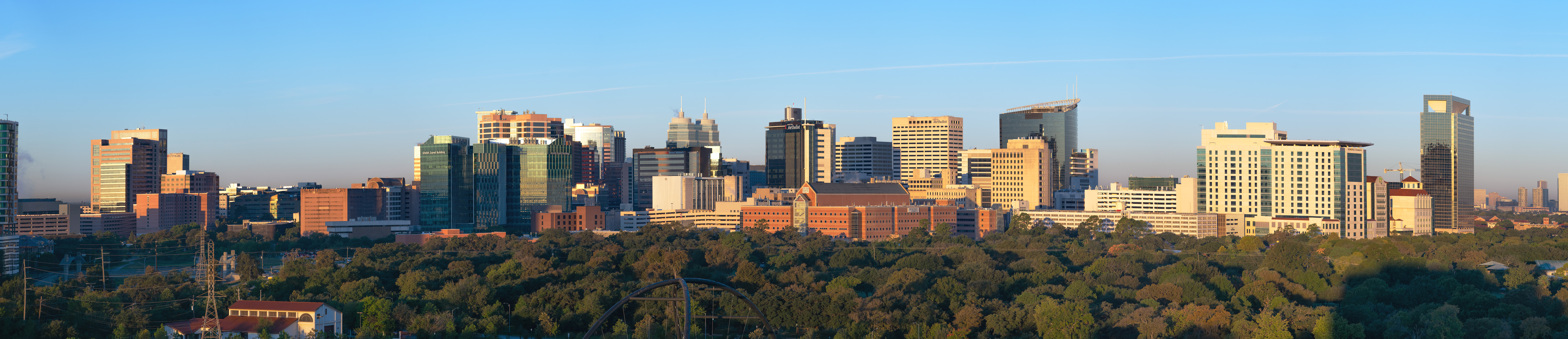
View of the Texas Medical Center from the east. Hermann Park is in the foreground.

The Texas Medical Center is a dense agglomeration of hospitals, schools, and ancillary businesses clustered on a triangular piece of land bordered by Rice University and the neighborhood of Southampton to the west, Brays Bayou to the south and east, and Hermann Park to the north. With 106,000 employees, the TMC has an employment density of approximately 50,475 per square mile (19,489/km^{2}). The Texas Medical Center Corporation has compared its dense cityscape to the Chicago Loop and Lower Manhattan.

The core of the TMC is serviced by three large arterial roads. Main and Fannin streets run southwest to northeast, while Holcombe Boulevard runs west to east. The Texas Medical Center is one of the few employment centers in Houston which is not directly serviced by a freeway; the nearest freeway is Texas State Highway 288, located to the east of Hermann Park. To compensate, the TMC has developed strong transit connections; the entirety of the district is serviced by the METRORail Red Line, which runs along Fannin. Rail stops in the Medical Center include Memorial Hermann Hospital/Houston Zoo, Dryden/TMC, and the Texas Medical Center Transit Center, which doubles as a hub for local bus routes. These three stops are the busiest stations on the Red Line; ultimately, the district's bus, light rail, and shuttle services deliver nearly 65,000 trips per day to and from the area.

In the 2010s, rapid development within the Medical Center began to strain existing transportation infrastructure; the average daily traffic on Fannin Street and nearby arterial Kirby Drive is expected to double by 2035. New development during the first half of the decade is expected to require an additional 50,000 parking spaces to meet demand. Solutions to the district's traffic problems include expanding existing arterial roads, boosting transit capacity, and constructing new contract parking lots on the outskirts.

The Third Ward Redevelopment Council defines the TMC as being part of the Third Ward. T. R. Witcher of the Houston Press wrote in 1995 that the TMC and nearby areas are "not the first places that come to mind when you say "Third Ward,"[...]".

=== Government services ===
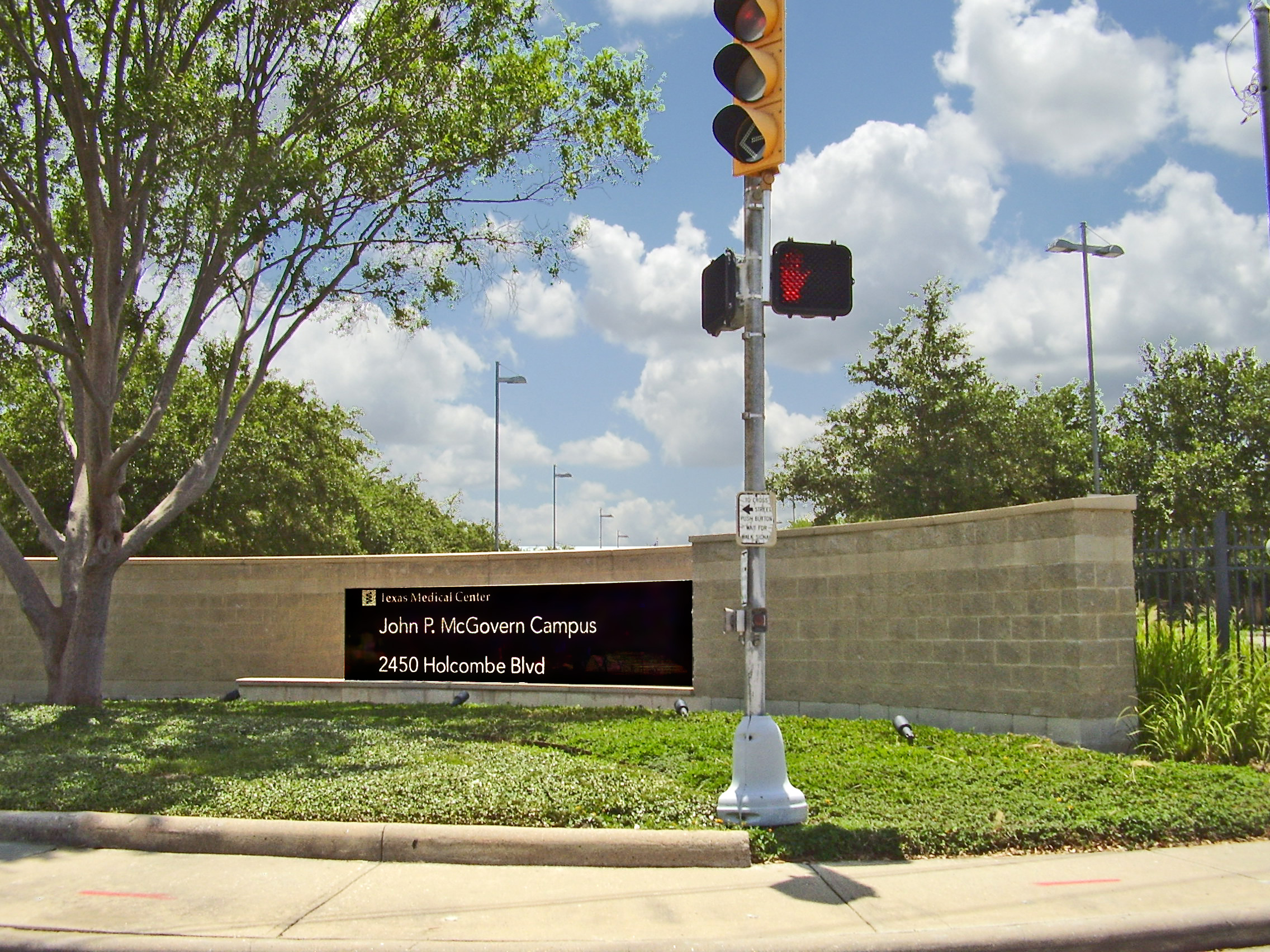
John P. McGovern Campus

The Texas Medical Center Corporation is headquartered at the John P. McGovern Campus on Holcombe Boulevard southeast of Hermann Park, adjacent to the Michael E. DeBakey Veterans Affairs Medical Center. The United States Postal Service operates the Medical Center Station on Almeda Road, and Harris County Public Library operates the Texas Medical Center Library near the Baylor School of Medicine.

The Houston Fire Department Station 33 Medical Center, a part of Fire District 21, is near the Texas Medical Center at 7100 Fannin at South Braeswood Boulevard. The original Firehouse 33 was one of the last stations to be housed in an original volunteer fire station. The original Station 33 was the city hall/fire station of Braeswood. The City of Houston annexed the area in 1950. The current Fire Station 33 opened one block from the original station in August 2004. The city relinquished its ownership of the original fire station.

The Texas Medical Center is within the Houston Police Department's South Central Patrol Division.

=== Residential developments ===
Formerly TMC had its own employee housing, Laurence H. Favrot Tower Apartments, which accommodated TMC employees and their dependents. On August 31, 2012 the complex closed. Dependent children living there were within the Houston Independent School District (HISD) and zoned to Roberts Elementary School in Southgate, Ryan Middle School in the Third Ward, and Lamar High School in Upper Kirby.

== Orchestra ==
Formerly known as the Doctors Orchestra of Houston, the Texas Medical Center Orchestra was established in November 2000 and is one of the few orchestras in the world that originated from health professions. Members of the orchestra include physicians, dentists, nurses, medical students, biomedical scientists, social workers and other health professionals.

The orchestra's stated mission is to provide health care professionals with opportunities to participate in symphonic music, present concerts that are open to the public, and feature programming that reflects the diversity of Houston. It also supports medically related and educational charities through performances and other programs.

Organizations which have received contributions include: The University of Texas Medical School for heart research; The Ben Taub BOOKS programs; The H.O.M.E.S Clinic; Making a Mark Art Program at Texas Children’s Hospital; HISD's DeBakey High School for Health Professions; Eye Care for Kids Foundation; The Greater Houston Chapter of the American Red Cross; The National Space Biomedical Research Institute; San Jose Clinic; Haddassah; and The Dr. Marnie Rose Foundation.

In an effort to increase appreciation for classical music in young audiences, Texas Medical Center Orchestra has developed a close relationship with the charter school, KIPP SHARP of KIPP Houston. By coordinating efforts with KIPP SHARP teachers and administrators, TMCO has integrated its musical programming into the school's curriculum. Works that the orchestra performs are taught and discussed in history, art and music classes. The students are invited to display artwork and essays in the Wortham lobby at TMCO concerts, and they are encouraged to attend with their families. TMCO has included KIPP choirs and orchestras in concert performances.

In 2011, TMCO began working with the National Multiple Sclerosis Society, Lone Star Chapter in an annual co-sponsorship of a bicycle ride, "Gran Fondo: Texas TMCO" that precedes the MS150 and benefits both organizations.

When the COVID-19 pandemic hit in 2020, the Texas Medical Center Orchestra was invited to perform Diane Warren's Oscar-nominated song, "I'm Standing With You" in a monumental music video that featured more than 170 artists from six continents. Warren teamed up with director Gev Miron and composer/arranger Sharon Farber to put this effort together, which has raised over $7 million for the United Nations Foundation’s COVID-19 Solidarity Response Fund for the World Health Organization (WHO).

== Demographics ==
The City of Houston defines an area around the Texas Medical Center as the Medical Center Super Neighborhood. In 2015 that area had 2,717 residents. 52% were non-Hispanic white, 16% each were non-Hispanic Black and Asian, 12% were Hispanics, and 4% were non-Hispanic other. In 2000, the area had 2,358 residents. 47% were non-Hispanic white, 33% were non-Hispanic Asian, 10% were Hispanic, 8% were non-Hispanic Black, and 2% were non-Hispanic other.

== Education ==
The main TMC area is within the Houston Independent School District (HISD).

Melinda Webb School, a private school for deaf infants to 7 years old, is located in the TMC; it is operated by the Center for Hearing and Speech and was previously at 3636 W. Dallas. The school serves as a day school for children not yet mainstreamed into regular classrooms and a speech and therapy center for those that are. Previously known as the Houston School for Deaf Children, it was given its current name, after a deaf girl, in 1997. The girl died of leukemia circa 1958; a former student of the school, she had been the first area deaf child to be mainstreamed into a public school, as she began attending one in Texas City in 1954. Her father, Frank Webb, donated $1 million to what became the Melinda Webb School in 2002. That year its enrollment was 35-40. In 2020 it began admitting preschool students without hearing difficulties to provide a more mainstream environment.

Medical Center Charter School opened in 1996, catered to employees working in the Medical Center, and had the Montessori method, used until grade two. Its specialty as of 2003 was foreign languages. It was not located near the TMC area but in the Westbury area. In 2014, the Texas Education Agency (TEA) announced that the school's performance was insufficient and that it sought to revoke its charter. By 2018, its charter had closed.

== Religion ==
Christian churches near the TMC include City Life Church, Palmer Memorial Episcopal Church, St. Mathew's Lutheran church, St. Paul's United Methodist Church, and St. Vincent de Paul Roman Catholic Church (of the Galveston-Houston Archdiocese). Nine churches established the Church Apartment Ministry, which maintains three apartment complexes for families visiting hospitalized patients.

There is a Jewish house of worship, Medical Center Chabad House, which maintains the Aishel House program.

The Islamic Society of Greater Houston (ISGH) maintains the Al-Ma'adah Musalla (Medical Center Musalla), a prayer area.

== Parks and recreation ==
The Weekley Family YMCA is in the area. It opened in 1951 as the Southwest YMCA, in West University Place. The current facility in Braeswood Place, Houston broke ground in 2001.

In 2023, Helix Park opened as part of the Texas Medical Center complex with six parks shaped around a double-helix and a campus collaboration building. The park is a center for connections, events, and outdoor respite in the heart of the life science center.

== Gallery ==
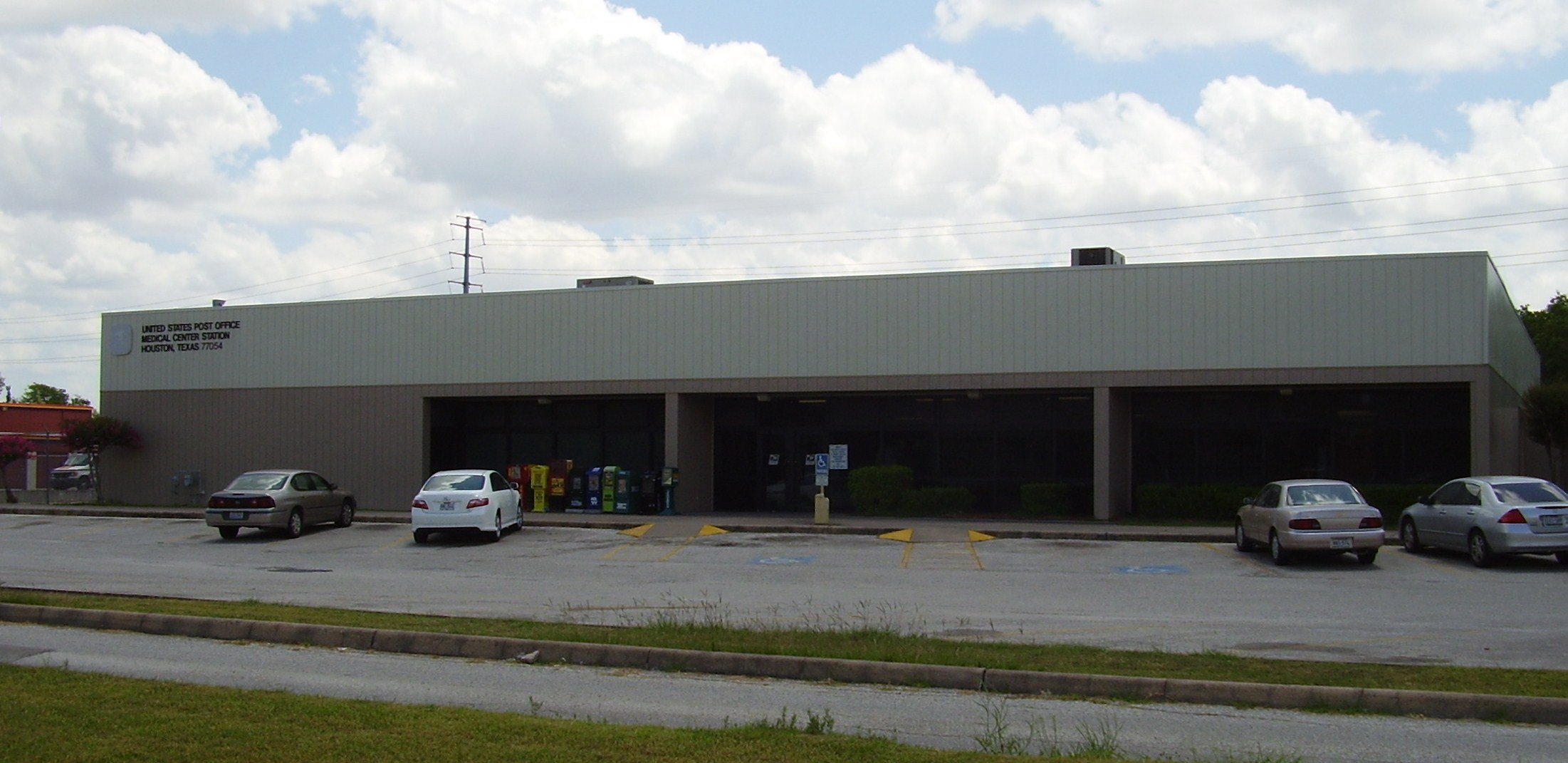
Medical Center Station Post Office

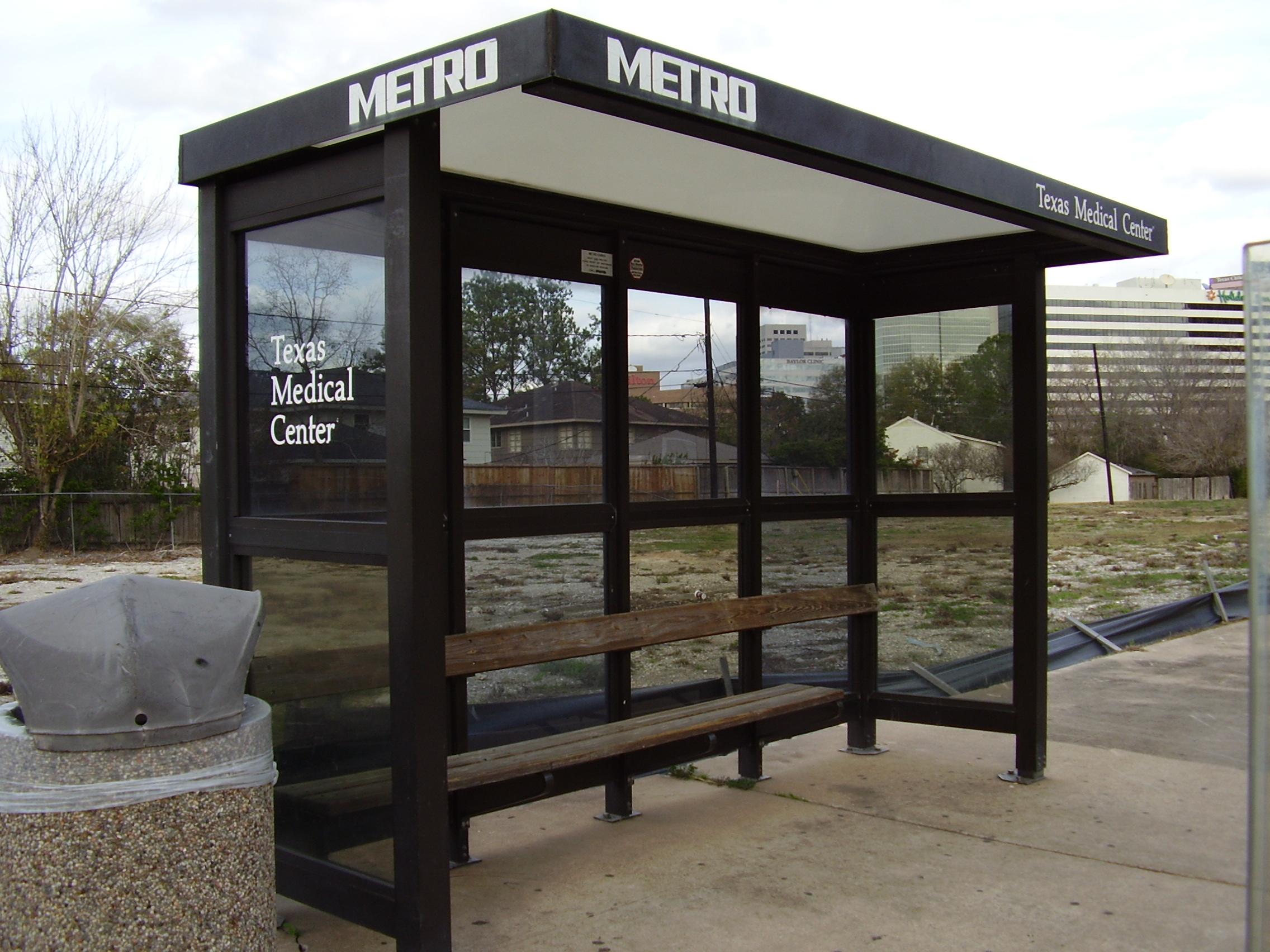
METRO stop in the Texas Medical Center area

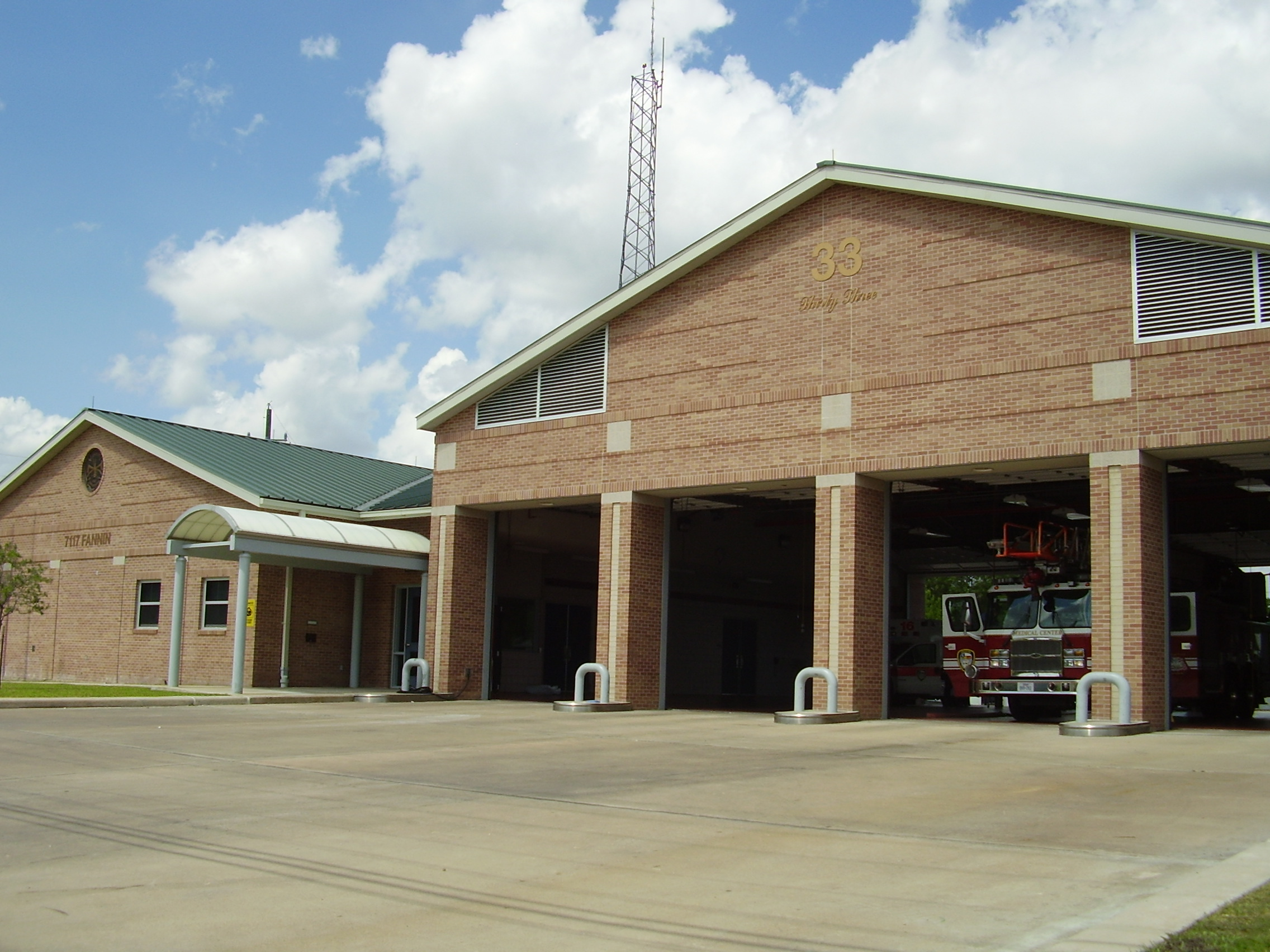
Fire Station 33 Medical Center

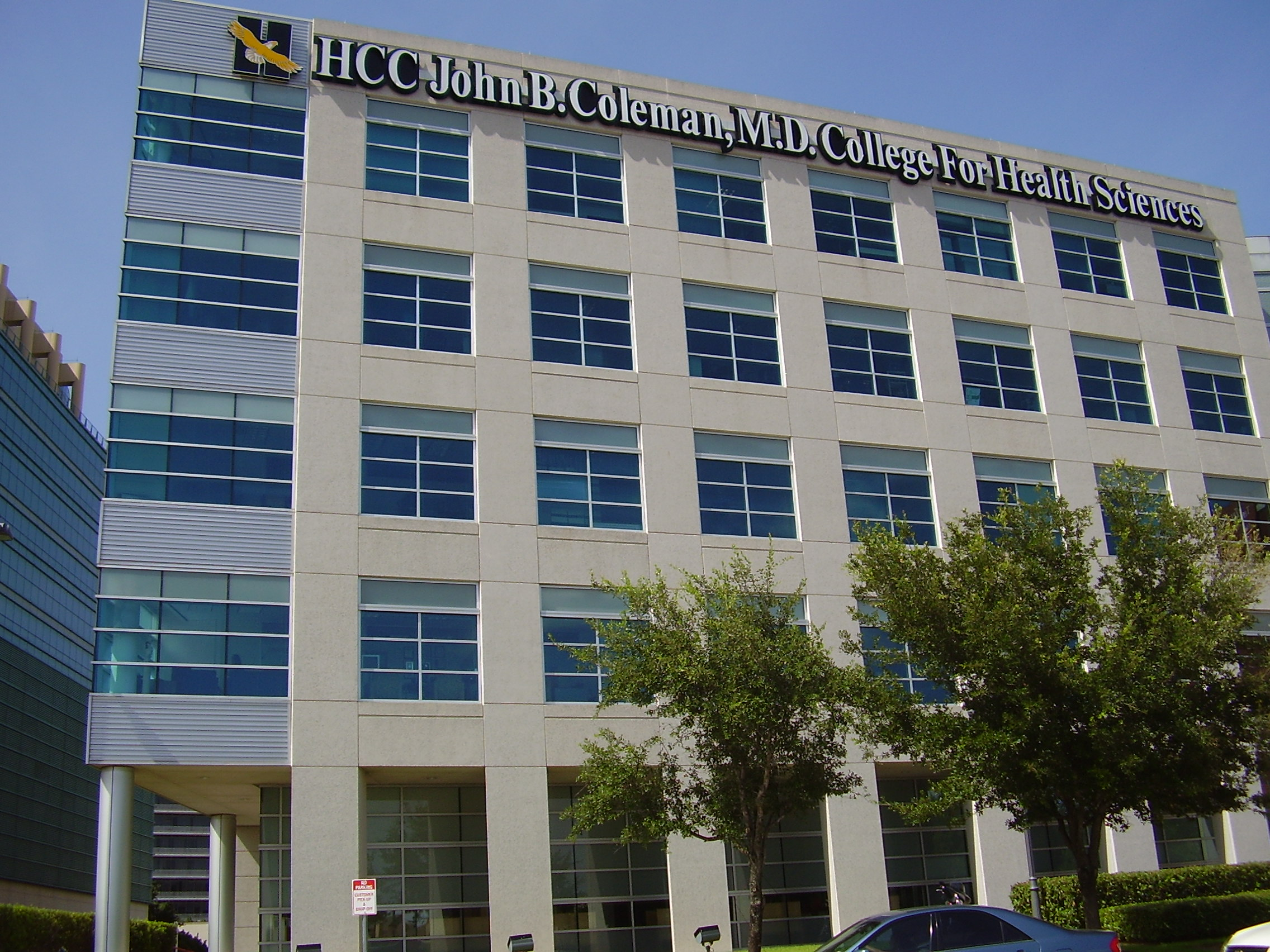
Coleman College for the Health Sciences, part of the Houston Community College system

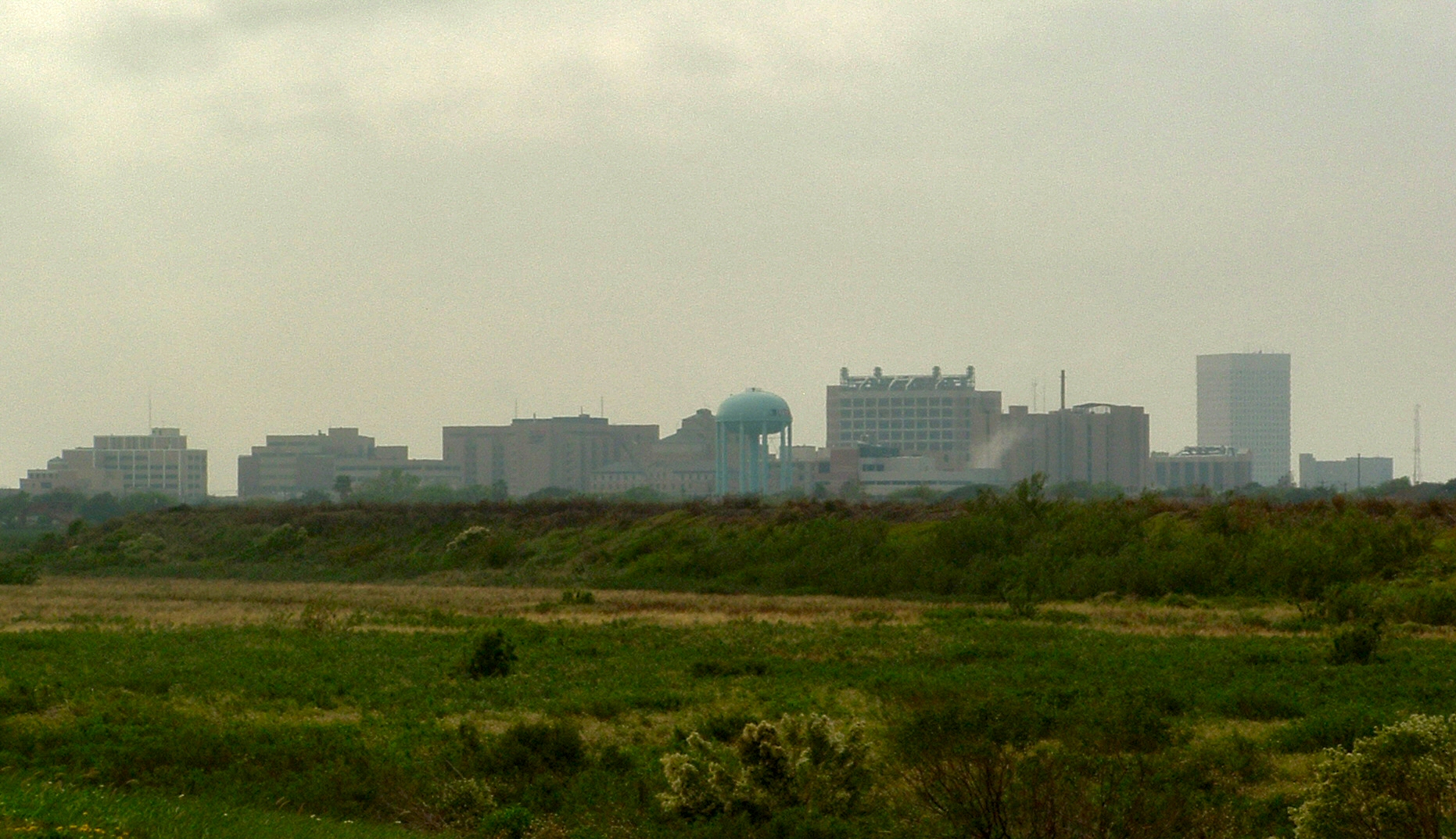
Skyline of the University of Texas Medical Branch at Galveston, the 49th member of the Texas Medical Center Corporation

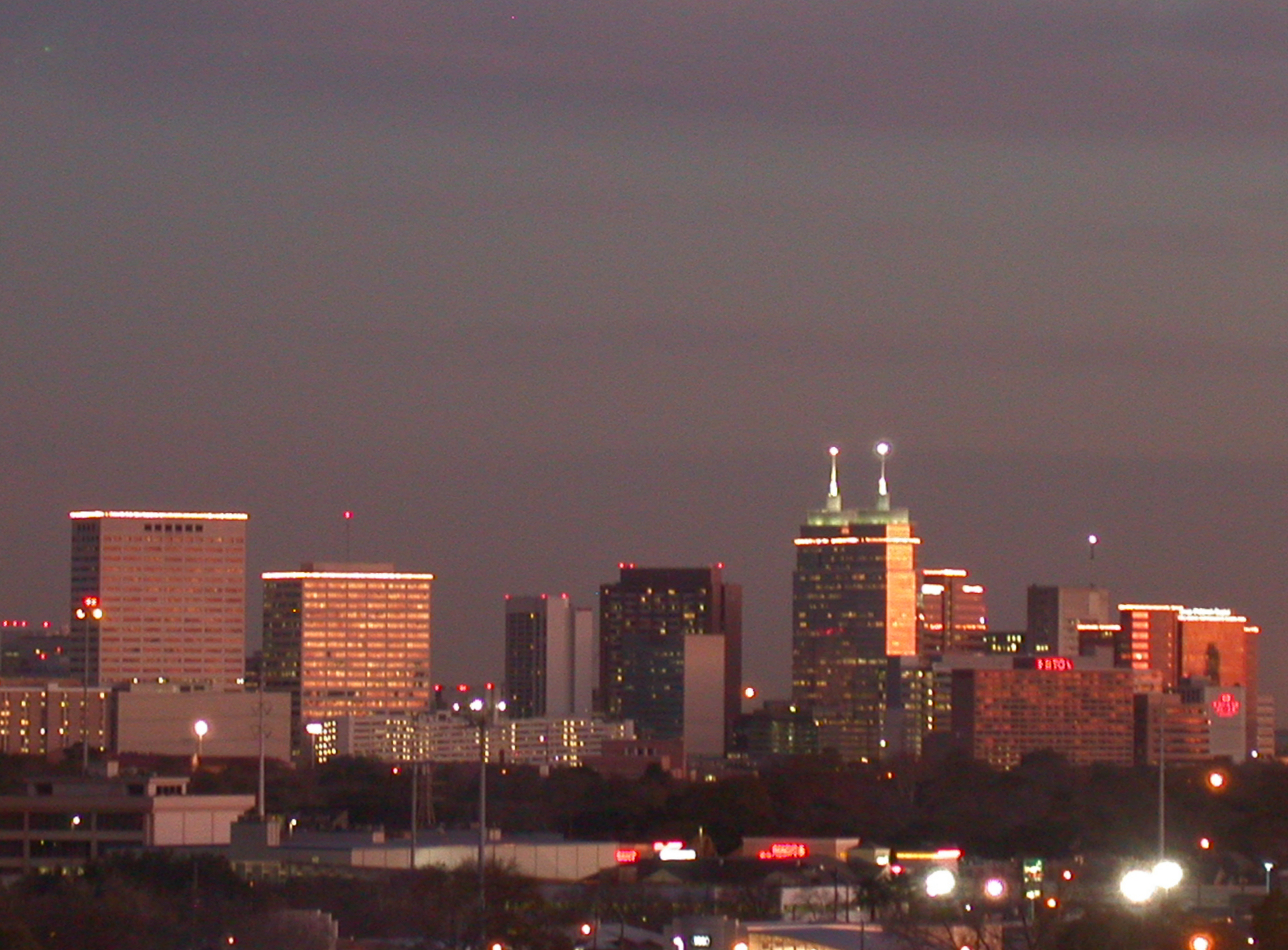
Skyline of the Texas Medical Center

== See also ==
- Medical centers in the United States
