= DePelchin Children's Center =

- Founded: 1892
- Founder: Kezia Payne DePelchin
- Location: 4950 Memorial Drive, Houston, Texas 77007, United States
- Website: http://www.depelchin.org
- Formerly called: DePelchin Faith Home, DePelchin Faith Home and Children's Bureau

DePelchin Children's Center, founded in 1892 in Houston, Texas, is a nonprofit organization focused on supporting and sustaining children and the families who care for them. DePelchin provides a range of services for children and families — it is an accredited foster care and adoption agency, and it also provides residential treatment for youth in foster care, as well as serving youth who are about to age out of foster care or have recently aged out of foster care. DePelchin’s services also include counseling, parenting classes, and other services focused on protecting children and keeping families strong. The center continues to be recognized at the state and federal level for cutting-edge programs, including a federal grant as a leading child trauma expert in Texas.

The former campus for DePelchin Children's Center at 2700 Albany Street is designated as a City of Houston Landmark and Texas Historic Landmark. It is also listed in the National Register of Historic Places.

The institution, which was founded by Kezia Payne DePelchin primarily as an orphanage for young children, quickly grew to include other services. Since its inception in 1892, DePelchin Children's Center has expanded its facilities and operations in order to offer even more services to the families of Houston.

== History ==
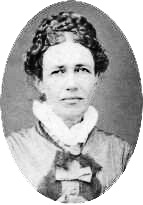
A picture of Kezia Payne DePelchin

The organization today known as DePelchin Children's Center was founded by Kezia Payne DePelchin in 1892. DePelchin survived a yellow fever outbreak that swept through Galveston in 1839. With her acquired immunity to yellow fever, Kezia Payne DePelchin nursed the victims of the disease during the epidemics that struck Houston and also traveled to aid yellow fever victims in cities as far away as Memphis, Tennessee, and Senatobia, Mississippi, between 1878 and 1879. When DePelchin returned to Houston, she became the first female matron of Bayland Orphans’ Home for Boys, which cared for young boys between the ages of six and twelve. In 1892, when DePelchin was approached with three orphan boys too young to be taken in by Bayland, she asked her friend Agnes Perry to open up a room in her house to care for the three boys. This small act effectively created the organization today known as DePelchin Children's Center. The number of children being taken in by DePelchin grew, and the institution moved to larger buildings to accommodate the additional children. Within a year of founding her Faith Home, DePelchin died on January 13, 1893, at the age of 64, from a bout of pneumonia she contracted while walking the five miles (8 km) between Bayland Orphans’ Home and her Faith Home. DePelchin often opted for this walk instead of riding a carriage in order to save a nickel that could be spent on the children. To carry on her work, DePelchin's friends and family secured a charter on March 24, 1893, to incorporate DePelchin Faith Home officially. When asked what DePelchin would call her institution, she responded, "I suppose I will have to call it my 'faith home.' I'm entirely dependent on my faith in God and the good people of Houston to support it."

=== Name and address changes ===
1892: DePelchin dubs 2500 Washington Avenue, the address of Agnes Perry's house, her “faith home.” On March 24, 1893, after DePelchin's death, a charter is secured so that her work can be continued.

1899: Because of a growing number of children in its care, the DePelchin Faith Home moves to a larger building on the corner of Chenevert and Pierce Streets.

1913: An even larger building is constructed at 2700 Albany Street to accommodate the growing number of children.

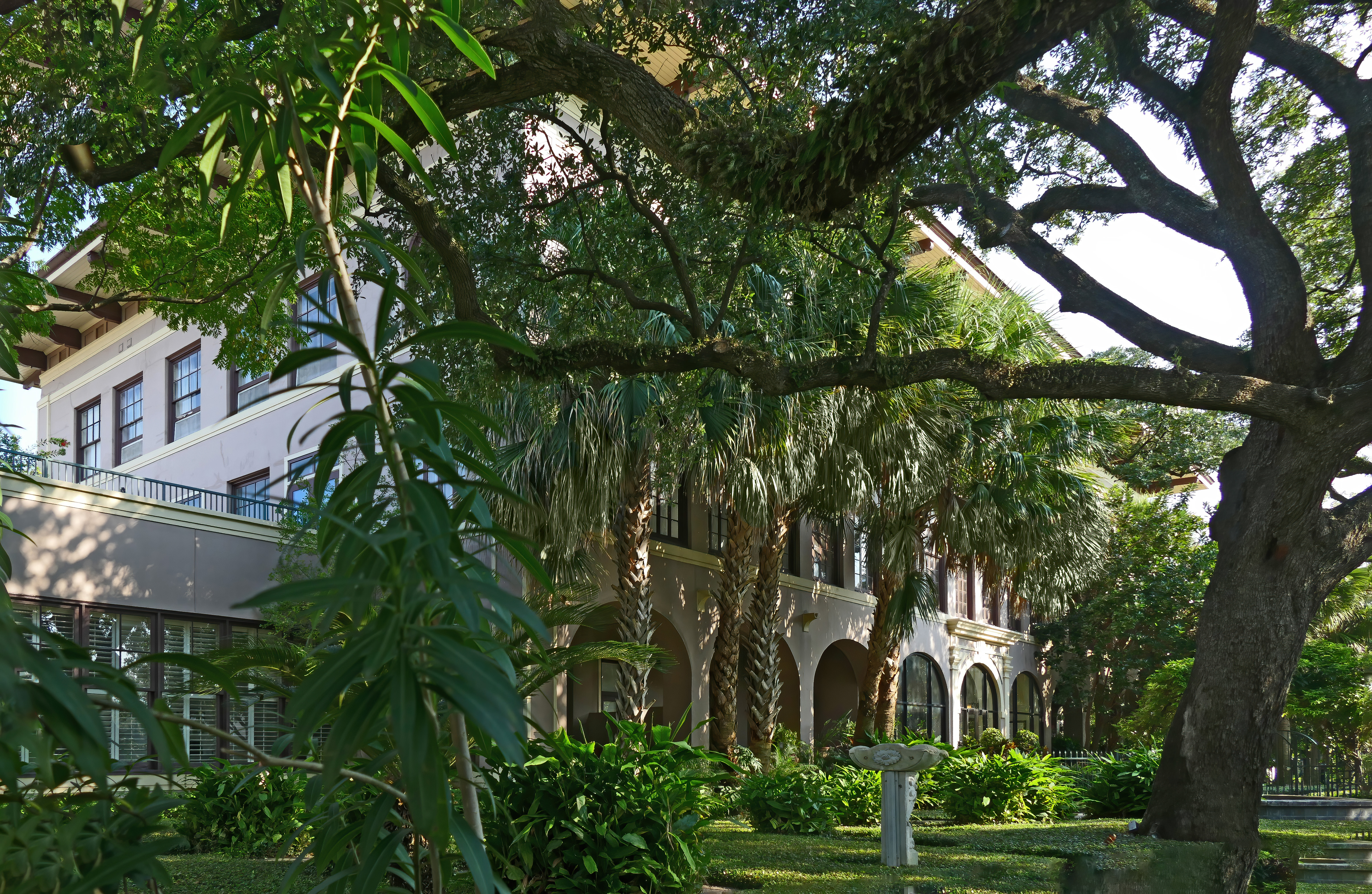
DePelchin Faith Home on Albany Street

1928: The institution's charter is renewed and its name changes to "DePelchin Faith Home and Children’s Bureau" in order to reflect the enlarged scope of the former Faith Home. The agency's new charter extends its field of services to include the general care of children, including foster home service, adoption, and protective work.

1934: A 50-acre (200,000 m^{2}) farm near Spring, Texas, is acquired for use as a summer camp.

1937: Partially with the help of the Works Progress Administration (WPA), construction on a 12-acre (49,000 m^{2}) lot at 100 Sandman Street begins.

1983: The name is changed from "DePelchin Faith Home and Children’s Bureau" to "DePelchin Children’s Center," the name the organization still carries today, and one that better reflects its expanded services.

2002: Following a successful capital campaign, DePelchin Children's Center moves into a large, new facility with the address of 4950 Memorial Drive, where the facility occupies the same physical lot as before.

2006: DePelchin was selected as the charitable partner of the Texas Bowl, which has donated more than $2 million in funding and millions in publicity support over the years.

2012: DePelchin expanded its footprint beyond Houston by merging with Caring Family Network, a foster care and adoption agency with offices in Austin, San Antonio, and Lubbock.

2022: The Boards of DePelchin Children’s Center and the Foundation for DePelchin Children’s Center assumed the campus assets of Today’s Harbor for Children in LaPorte.

=== Historical recognition ===
- DePelchin Faith Hope
- U.S. National Register of Historic Places
- Recorded Texas Historic Landmark
- Texas State Antiquities Landmark
- Location: 2700 Albany; Houston
- Built: 1913
- Architect: Mauran & Russell
- NRHP reference No.: 84001759
- RTHL No.: 10659
- TSAL No.: 322

Significant dates
- Added to NRHP: August 9, 1984
- Designated RTHL: 1984
- Designated TSAL: 9/17/1993

The building at 2700 Albany Street that housed DePelchin Faith Home between 1913 and 1938 was specially designed by architecture firm Mauran & Russell. This incarnation of Faith Home features an open arcade on the bottom story with Doric columns to support a classical cornice; the structure was modeled after an Italianate villa, a popular architectural movement in late 19th century America. The design contains characteristics emblematic of the architectural trends of the era such as sleeping porches and a flat roof that projects far out with broad eaves. The National Register of Historic Places recognizes this building for its architectural significance as well as for its importance in social history. The building is also recognized as a City of Houston Landmark and a Texas Historic Landmark.

=== Negro Child Center ===
On November 30, 1947, DePelchin Faith Home and Children's Bureau formally dedicated the opening of its Negro Child Center. The center stood at 1900 Solo Street in Houston's Fifth Ward and was notable for being the first institution of its kind in the South to welcome African-American children in need. The dedication was the result of seven years’ effort on the part of Houston residents, an effort that started after DePelchin took in its first African-American children in 1939.

Eva Burmeister, a respected social worker, praised DePelchin Faith Home and Children's Bureau as “one of the finest in the country” for its dedicated commitment to helping children of all races and for its unique layout. Similar institutions in the United States at the time typically designed their residence buildings in a dormitory style, but DePelchin modeled its residence buildings in a cottage layout, meaning that children were housed in several free-standing, small buildings rather than one large building. This arrangement was thought to be more conducive to creating a healthy home environment than was a dormitory-style building.

=== Mergers and acquisitions ===
1982: DePelchin Faith Home and Children's Bureau subsumes the Houston branch of Florence Crittenton Services, a charitable organization that provides help and a home for pregnant teenagers.

1987: On September 22, a temporary emergency shelter for adolescents and teenagers managed by Youth Opportunities Unlimited (YOU) in Richmond, Texas, is incorporated into DePelchin Children's Center.

1992: On April 1, DePelchin Children's Center merges with Houston Child Guidance Center, which represents a major expansion for DePelchin in the field of mental health. The Houston Child Guidance Center, founded by Ima Hogg in 1929, was a pioneer of mental health services because it offered an alternative to hospitalization. Its focus was on family involvement, working with the entire family to mitigate the problem. The organization tried to keep children in their homes to maintain the family network, which it felt to be important for mental health. DePelchin entered the mental health field in 1982 with the establishment of Cullen Bayou Place, named in honor of a $5 million endowment from the Cullen Foundation. The facility functioned as a psychiatric hospital that specialized in caring for children and adolescents.

== Services ==
DePelchin's services focus on foster care and adoption, residential treatment, prevention and early intervention, and counseling for children and families.

Renovated in 2002, the current campus of DePelchin Children's Center at 4950 Memorial Drive, Houston, Texas 77007

DePelchin also offers prevention and early intervention programs to promote healthy families and decrease the future need for more intensive services. This includes services to at-risk youths facing substance abuse, truancy, and other issues; school-based counseling; teen pregnancy prevention; assistance to pregnant and parenting teens; and family education programs to improve parenting skills and decrease risk factors leading to abuse and neglect. These programs are offered throughout the Greater Houston community at schools, community centers, and in homes. DePelchin also offers general parenting classes to strengthen families, including programs that focus specifically on fatherhood.

DePelchin provides foster care and adoption services in each of its four Texas markets. In some cases, children who have been removed from their birth homes by Child Protective Services (CPS) can be reunited with their families. Otherwise, these children are placed in foster care or adoptive homes. DePelchin also provides infant adoption services to birth mothers and fathers desiring to place their unborn or newborn infants into adoptive homes.

DePelchin's Transitioning to Adulthood through Guidance and Support (TAGS) Program seeks to provide a safe, stable environment for homeless young adults, ages 18–22, who have aged out of the child welfare system. In addition to offering temporary residence, the TAGS Program provides youths the opportunities, knowledge and skills necessary to mature into productive, responsible adults capable of becoming independent. In addition, in 2023, DePelchin plans to provide services at the former Today’s Harbor for Children campus in LaPorte, Texas. The programs offered there will serve youth aging out of foster care.

DePelchin Children's Center's main campus is located at 4950 Memorial Drive. In addition, there are multiple satellite locations throughout the Greater Houston area, including Stafford, Baytown, The Woodlands, Richmond, and Clear Lake. There are also locations in San Antonio, Austin, and Lubbock

DePelchin contracts with The University of Texas Charter School system to provide on-grounds, state-accredited educational services for the children in residential treatment on the main campus in Richmond, Texas.

== Kezia DePelchin Award ==
The Kezia DePelchin Award was established in 1998 as a way to honor individuals who are committed to serving as advocates for the mental health and physical well-being of children.

=== Recipients ===
1998: Former President George H.W. Bush and First Lady Barbara Bush

1999: Ann G. Trammell

2000: Former First Lady Rosalynn Carter

2001: Pediatrician Dr. Thomas Berry Brazelton

2002: Anne S. Duncan

2003: Doctor Peggy B. Smith

2004: CEO of Kinder Morgan Energy Partners Richard Kinder and wife Nancy

2005: Catherine and Robert Mosbacher Jr.

2006: Flo and Bill McGee

2007: Bobbie and John Nau III, CEO of Silver Eagle Distributors

2008: CEO of Hines Interests Limited Partnership Jeff Hines and wife Wendy

2009: Jesse H. Jones II

2010: Owners of the Houston Texans NFL team Janice and Robert McNair

2011: The Honorable James Baker, III and Susan Garrett Baker

2012: The Junior League of Houston & ExxonMobil (Corporate Volunteer Award)

2013: Nancy Powell Moore

2014: Nancy Gordon

2015: The Lovett Family

2016: Pat and Tom Powers

2017: No honoree due to 125th celebration

2018: Texas Bowl

2019: Hamill Foundation

2020: Hannah and Cal McNair

2021: Charles Szalkowski

2022: The Gordy Family

2023: Baker Botts

== Affiliations ==
In 1933, DePelchin officially joined the Child Welfare League of America (CWLA).

After the Houston branch of the Florence Crittenton services switched management to DePelchin Children's Center in 1982, DePelchin became a formal member of the Florence Crittenton's Family of Agencies.

DePelchin is a member of the Alliance for Children & Families, a national membership organization that supports education and training for organizations serving children and families, as well as the Texas Alliance for Child and Family Services, an organization that provides nonprofits with advocacy, public policy, and technical assistance.

DePelchin is also licensed as a Child Placing agency and a Child Care agency by the Texas Department of Family and Protective Services (TDFPS). This state agency is charged with the welfare and protection of children and is responsible for issuing licenses to organizations that permit them to operate residential treatment facilities, provide foster care, and place children in adoptive homes.
