= List of deans of Columbia Law School =

Deans of Columbia Law School:

Image	Dean	Tenure	Notes
	Theodore William Dwight	1858–1891	as "Warden", left to found New York Law School
	William A. Keener	1891–1901	
	George Washington Kirchwey	1901–1910	
	Harlan Fiske Stone	1910–1923	earned LL.B. from Columbia in 1898
	Huger Jervey	1923–1927	earned LL.B. from Columbia in 1913
	Young Berryman Smith	1927–1952	earned LL.B. from Columbia in 1912
	William Clements Warren	1952–1970	
	Michael I. Sovern	1970–1979	earned LL.B. from Columbia in 1955. Left to become provost of Columbia University
	Albert J. Rosenthal	1979–1984	
	Benno C. Schmidt, Jr.	1984–1986	left to become president of Yale University
	Barbara Aronstein Black	1986–1991	earned LL.B. from Columbia in 1955. First female dean of an Ivy League law school
	Lance Liebman	1991–1996	
	David W. Leebron	1996–2004	left to become president of Rice University
	David M. Schizer	2004–2014	
	Gillian Lester	2015–2024	
	Daniel Abebe	2024–	

== See also ==
- Law school dean
