= Edith Branson =

American painter

- Born: Edith Lanier Branson; December 11, 1893; Georgia, US
- Died: March 29, 1976 (aged 84); Chapel Hill, North Carolina, US
- Resting place: Old Chapel Hill Cemetery, Chapel Hill, North Carolina
- Spouse: Young Berryman Smith

Edith Branson (1891–1976) was an American painter who was known for her use of color to convey emotions. Her mature work included stylized figures and natural subjects as well as complete abstractions. She was intensely committed to her craft but made little effort to show in commercial galleries or sell her paintings by other means. Although her work appeared mostly in extremely large group exhibitions, it was nonetheless frequently singled out for comment in the local press.

== Early life and training ==
Statement in an Art Exhibition Catalog of 1935

Edith Branson has been delving in color for fifteen years, chiefly studying with Charles Martin of Columbia, who gave her the courage to work by herself. This she did for five years, studying Persian and Indian Miniatures at the Metropolitan. Since then she has found her own path, working in purely abstract forms in which she feels she can best convey her joy in color. She believes that all the depth of emotion that can be experienced thru sound, can also be experienced thru color.

Branson was raised in Athens, Georgia where her father was head of the State Normal School. Having married in 1914, she and her husband moved to Manhattan in 1916. She did not enroll in an art school but studied informally with Charles J. Martin, A. S. Baylinson, and Kenneth Hayes Miller. She also gave close observation of classical Indian and Chinese art in collections of the Metropolitan Museum of Art and made sketches in a stylized abstraction from them.

== Career in art ==
Branson rented a studio in the Lincoln Arcade Building at Broadway and 65th Street near Lincoln Square. She became acquainted with other artists who had studios there including Robert Henri, George Bellows, Ralph Barton, Raphael Soyer and, in particular, members of the Society of Independent Artists who had founded the organization in one of the building's studios in 1916. They were Walter Arensberg, John Covert, Marcel Duchamp, Katherine Sophie Dreier, William J. Glackens, Albert Gleizes, John Marin, Walter Pach, Man Ray, Mary Rogers (artist), John Sloan and Joseph Stella. Long afterwards, she said about that time: "Those were exciting days. We were all outcasts, more or less." (Note: The Lincoln Arcade Building (or Lincoln Square Arcade Building) was a six-story mixed use structure located at Broadway and 65th Street in Manhattan. It had skylight-equipped studios on its top floor that artists could rent at low cost. In addition to its artists, Van Wyck Brooks wrote, the building was a "rookery of half-fed students, astrologers, prostitutes, actors, models, prize-fighters, quacks and dancers.") She shared the studio with other artists, but paid the full rent herself because, as she saw matters, her husband's income allowed her to afford the cost whereas they, without financial support, could not afford it. In 1921 she began a practice that was to continue over the next 20 years of exhibiting her work in the society's annual shows. (Note: Her paintings are listed in catalogs of the society's annual exhibitions for 1921, 1924, 1925, 1930, 1931, 1932, 1934, 1935, 1938, 1940, 1941) In 1934 she joined the board of directors of the society, a post that she continued to hold until 1940.

The annual exhibitions were enormous. On paying a small fee any artist could display work in them and each year hundreds of them did so. The range of quality of artistic style was extremely broad. (Note: In 1923 John Sloan acknowledged this fact. He said "Any artist can show his work at our exhibitions. We, therefore, do not have a good exhibit. That is, the majority of the pictures shown are not good. But it is a place where a young artist or an artist with new and striking ideas can find a place to show them. It is a jungle of art.") Between its first exhibition in 1917 and its last in 1944 the society attracted participation from nearly 7,000 artists coming from the whole of the United States and many other countries. Although many of these artists failed to establish reputations in the New York art world, many others achieved professional success. (Note: In an article covering the 25th annual exhibition in 1941 Edward Alden Jewell, critic for the New York Times, listed some of these, including many of the founding members (listed above) and Charles Hawthorne, Rockwell Kent, Maurice Prendergast, Arnold Friedman, and Maurice Sterne.) In addition to Branson, notable women artists who showed at annual exhibitions included Mary E. Hutchinson, Marguerite Zorach, Ann Brockman, Agnes Weinrich, Katherine Dreier, Mary Rogers, Adelaide Lawson, and Theresa Bernstein.

Branson's paintings had been singled out for comment during the society's exhibitions in 1930 and 1932 and in 1935 they drew more substantial critical attention when she showed in a solo exhibition at New York's Contemporary Arts Gallery. (Note: New York's Contemporary Arts Gallery opened in 1929. Led by Emily Francis, it aimed to "bring before the public the work of the mature artist regardless of his financial, social, or racial condition." It was the first gallery to show work by Mark Tobey, Mark Rothko, Louis Schanker, Stanley Twardowicz, and other notable artists.) In 1930 Marion Clyde McCarroll, a critic for the New York Post, set a mildly humorous tone for subsequent reviews by making fun of the vague titles she supplied for the two abstractions she submitted. In 1932 the Brooklyn Daily Eagle's William Weer chided of Branson for calling an abstraction "very conservative," and Edward Alden Jewell of the New York Times said the same painting was "simply ornamental disintegration." When her paintings appeared at Contemporary Arts in 1935 a critic for the New York Sun complained about vague titles and took issue with her assertion that they conveyed emotion using color in the way that music conveyed emotion. The Post critic felt the same about the analogy between sound and color but said, nonetheless, that she handled color well. That praise was something she was unaccustomed to receiving. Simply being noticed was an achievement for a woman abstractionist at that time. Critics reacted to Branson's paintings because, as one said, their effect was striking. The ability of her paintings to stand out from the hundreds of others on show in the society's exhibitions most likely came from their quality as works of art rather than any efforts on her part to promote them.

In 1935 Branson's painting, "Orchestration," was selected for an exhibition called Abstract Painting in America, held at the Whitney Museum of American Art. A general survey of abstractionism over two decades, the show contained more than 100 works by 65 artists, five of whom were women. (Note: In addition to Branson, the women were Helen West Heller, Helen Lloyd, Georgia O'Keeffe, and Marguerite Zorach.) Later that year her painting "Dawn" was selected for the 14th Annual Corcoran Biennial. The selection was significant in that the jurors chose paintings that were broadly representative of art in America, including works by traditionalists as well as moderns, artists with established reputations as well as lesser-known ones. In 1935 and again in 1937 Branson showed with the New York Society of Women Artists which was considered to provide a radical alternative for women who were dissatisfied with the relatively conservative National Association of Women Painters and Sculptors. (Note: The New York Society of Women Artists was founded in 1925 explicitly as an alternative to the National Association of Women Painters and Sculptors. It aimed to show art that was innovative and not overly feminine. Each member was allotted the same amount of space in its exhibitions. The founding members included Adelaide Lawson, Agnes Weinrich, Anne Goldthwaite, Blanche Lazzell, Henrietta Shore, Louise Upton Brumback, Margaret Wendell Huntington, Marjorie Organ, and Sonia Gordon Brown.) In 1938 she showed paintings in an exhibition held by a Depression-era work relief organization, New York's Municipal Art Committee. (Note: Mayor Fiorello La Guardia established the Municipal Art Committee in the fall of 1934 to provide employment for New York's musicians, performers, artists, and other out-of-work arts workers. Groups of artists submitted applications to the committee and exhibitions were changed every two months. In February 1938 Branson participated in a successful application to appear in 26th Municipal Art Committee show.) Later that year one of her paintings, "Forms," was selected to illustrate the catalog for that year's Society of Independent Artists exhibition. In 1938 and again in 1940 Branson showed in a group exhibition staged by Contemporary Arts called "Small Paintings for the Home."

=== Artistic style and critical reception ===
Edith Branson, Dawn, oil on canvas, 28 x 22 inches

Edith Branson, The C.P. Dey, 1928, watercolor, 20 x 15 inches

Edith Branson, Self-portrait, about 1933-34, pastel, 18 x 24 inches

Edith Branson, Dancing Rhythm, Oil on board, 24 x 34 inches

Branson's style varied over the course of her career. Her first paintings were meticulous copies of Classical Persian and Indian art in the Metropolitan Museum of Art. This form of self-instruction followed advice from two instructors at Columbia's Teachers College who were also members of the Society of Independent Artists, Arthur Wesley Dow and Charles Martin. She later said that Martin helped her to develop the confidence needed to apply the skills this copying gave her as she developed the abstract style of her mature art. Other painters who gave her informal instruction were A. S. Baylinson and Kenneth Hayes Miller. Some of her paintings were pure abstractions and many had discernible subjects, whether figures or objects in nature. Some had cubist elements, others surrealist, but the dominant theme was the deployment of color forms to convey emotion. In 1935 the introductory statement to an art exhibition catalog maintained that she was "working in purely abstract forms in which she feels she can best convey her joy in color. She believes that all the depth of emotion that can be experienced thru sound, can also be experienced thru color." Branson's painting, "Dawn" (at left), illustrates her purely abstract style. The seascape, "C. P. Dey" (at right), shows a treatment of objects in nature. Her self-portrait (at left), illustrates Branson's handling of figures. Her painting, "Dancing Rhythm" (at right) illustrates Branson's use of color to convey emotion.

== Personal life and family ==
Born on December 11, 1891, Branson graduated from high school but did not attend college. In 1914 she married Young Berryman Smith. The couple were married in Chapel Hill and initially lived in Atlanta where Smith was an attorney with a local law firm. A Georgia native, he had been educated at the University of Georgia and Columbia Law School. In 1915, when he joined the law faculty at Columbia, they moved to Manhattan. By 1919 Smith was a full professor and in 1930 he became the school's Dean, a position he retained until 1952. Smith served on an Armed Forces committee to prepare a plan for giving military personnel educational opportunities at the close of World War II and was chairman of the New York State Law Revision Commission in 1947. The couple had one child.

Branson died on March 29, 1976, in Chapel Hill, North Carolina, and was buried in the Old Chapel Hill Cemetery.
