= Harlan F. Stone =

Chief Justice of the United States from 1941 to 1946

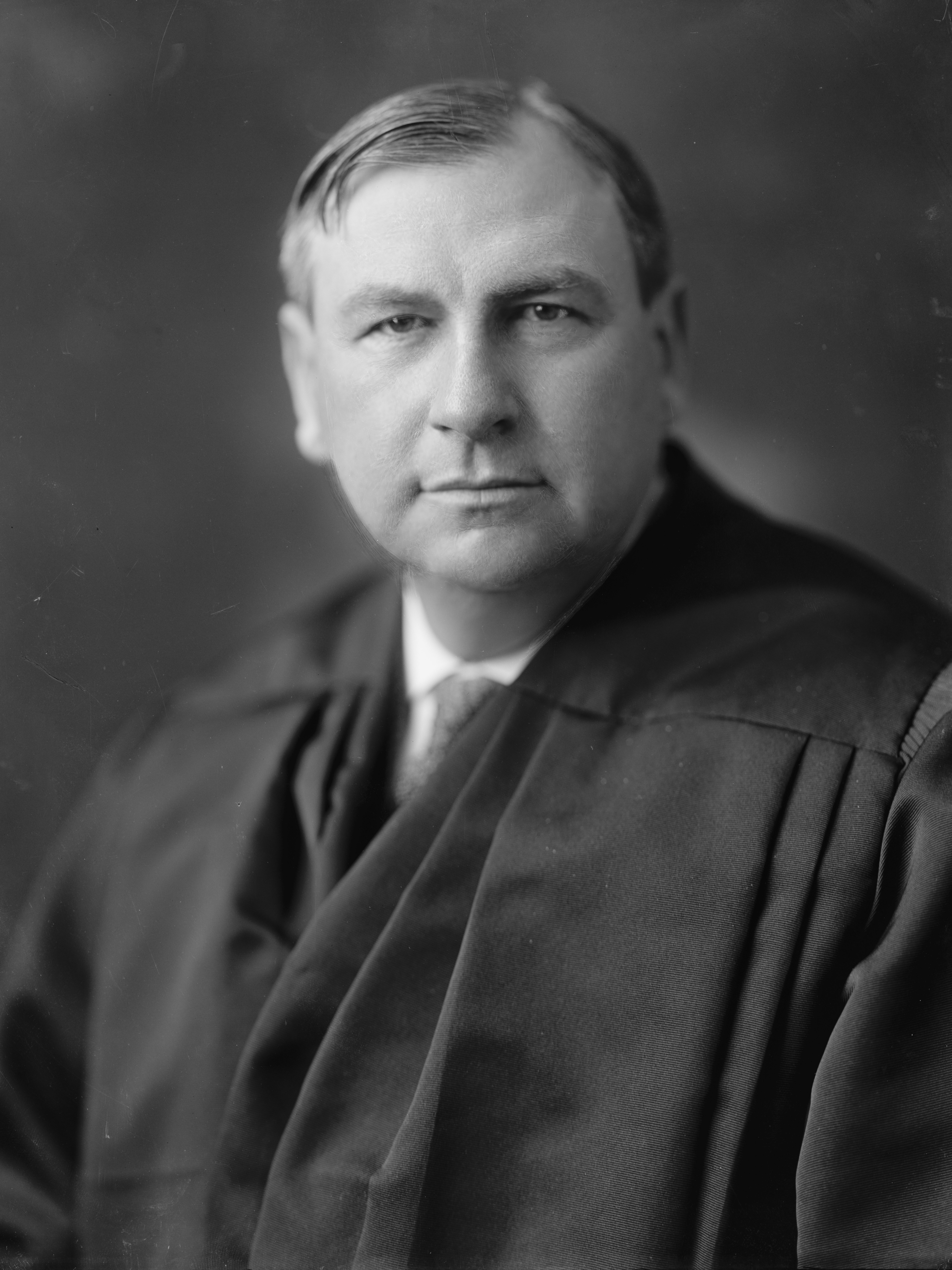
- Portrait by Harris & Ewing, 1905–1945

12th Chief Justice of the United States
- In office July 3, 1941 – April 22, 1946
- Nominated by: Franklin D. Roosevelt
- Preceded by: Charles Evans Hughes
- Succeeded by: Fred M. Vinson

Associate Justice of the Supreme Court of the United States
- In office March 2, 1925 – July 3, 1941
- Nominated by: Calvin Coolidge
- Preceded by: Joseph McKenna
- Succeeded by: Robert H. Jackson

52nd United States Attorney General
- In office April 7, 1924 – March 1, 1925
- President: Calvin Coolidge
- Preceded by: Harry M. Daugherty
- Succeeded by: John G. Sargent

4th Dean of Columbia Law School
- In office 1910–1923
- Preceded by: George Washington Kirchwey
- Succeeded by: Young Berryman Smith

Personal details
- Born: Harlan Fiske Stone; October 11, 1872 Chesterfield, New Hampshire, U.S.
- Died: April 22, 1946 (aged 73) Washington, D.C., U.S.
- Resting place: Rock Creek Cemetery
- Party: Republican
- Spouse: Agnes Harvey (m. 1899)
- Children: Marshall; Lauson
- Education: Massachusetts Agricultural College; Amherst College (BS); Columbia University (LLB)

Harlan Fiske Stone (October 11, 1872 – April 22, 1946) was an American attorney who served as an associate justice of the U.S. Supreme Court from 1925 to 1941 and then as the 12th chief justice of the United States from 1941 until his death in 1946. He also served as the U.S. Attorney General from 1924 to 1925 under President Calvin Coolidge, with whom he had attended Amherst College as a young man. His most famous dictum was that "Courts are not the only agency of government that must be assumed to have capacity to govern."

Raised in Western Massachusetts, Stone practiced law in New York City after graduating from Columbia Law School. He became the Dean of Columbia Law School and a partner with Sullivan & Cromwell. During World War I, he served on the U.S. Department of War's Board of Inquiry, which evaluated the sincerity of conscientious objectors. In 1924, President Calvin Coolidge appointed Stone as the Attorney General. Stone sought to reform the U.S. Department of Justice in the aftermath of several scandals that occurred during the administration of President Warren G. Harding. He also pursued several antitrust cases against large corporations.

In 1925, President Calvin Coolidge nominated Stone to the Supreme Court to succeed retiring Associate Justice Joseph McKenna, and Stone won U.S. Senate confirmation with little opposition. On the Taft Court, Stone joined with Justices Oliver Wendell Holmes Jr. and Louis Brandeis in calling for judicial restraint and deference to the legislative will. On the Hughes Court, Stone and Justices Brandeis and Benjamin N. Cardozo formed a liberal bloc called the Three Musketeers that generally voted to uphold the constitutionality of the New Deal. His majority opinions in United States v. Darby Lumber Co. (1941) and United States v. Carolene Products Co. (1938) were influential in shaping standards of judicial scrutiny.

In 1941, President Franklin D. Roosevelt nominated Stone to succeed the retiring Chief Justice Charles Evans Hughes and Stone was promptly confirmed by the Senate. The Stone Court presided over several cases during World War II, and Stone's majority opinion in Ex parte Quirin upheld the jurisdiction of a U.S. military tribunal over the trial of eight German saboteurs. His majority opinion in International Shoe Co. v. Washington (1945) was influential with regard to personal jurisdiction. Stone was the chief justice in Korematsu v. United States (1944), ruling the exclusion of Japanese Americans into internment camps as constitutional. Stone served as Chief Justice until his death in 1946. He had one of the shortest terms of any chief justice, and was the first chief justice not to have served in an elected office.

== Early years ==
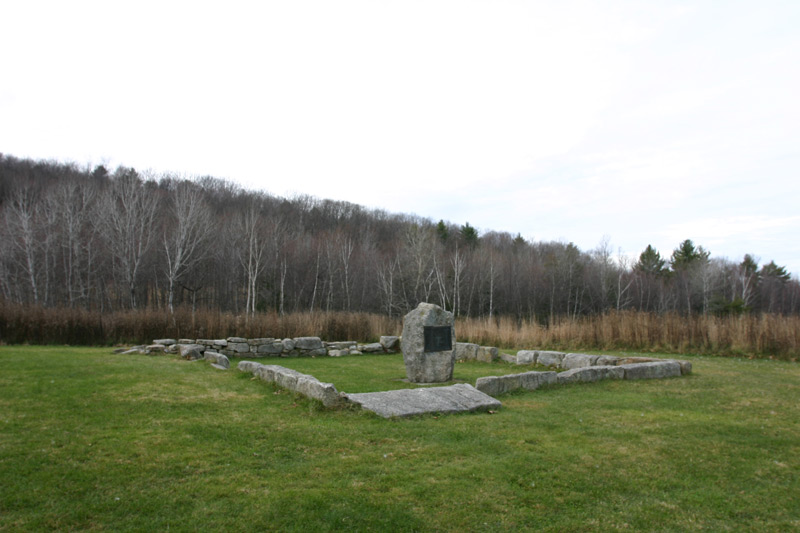
Birthplace of Stone

Stone was born in Chesterfield, New Hampshire, on October 11, 1872, to Fred Lauson Stone and Ann Sophia (née Butler) Stone. When Stone was two years old, his family moved to Western Massachusetts where he grew up. He graduated from Amherst High School. His father wished him to become a scientific farmer, and Stone matriculated at the Massachusetts Agricultural College where he attended classes from 1888 to 1890 and was later expelled at the end of his second year for a scuffle with an instructor. He later enrolled at Amherst College, where he graduated in 1894 Phi Beta Kappa.

From 1894 to 1895, he was the sub master of Newburyport High School in Massachusetts, from which he also taught physics and chemistry. From 1895 to 1896, he was an instructor in history at Adelphi Academy in Brooklyn.

== Legal career ==
Stone attended Columbia Law School from 1895 to 1898, received an LL.B., and was admitted to the New York bar in 1898. Stone practiced law in New York City, initially as a member of the firm Wilmer and Canfield, which (near the time of William Nivison Wilmer's death in 1907) was renamed Satterlee, Canfield & Stone. Stone's partners there were Herbert Livingston Satterlee (who became Assistant Secretary of the Navy) and George Folger Canfield (an early professor at Columbia Law School). Later, Stone became a partner in what is now a white-shoe law firm, Sullivan & Cromwell. He taught at Columbia Law School as a lecturer (1899–1902) and adjunct professor (1902–1905), beginning at a salary of $2,000 that eventually increased to $3,000. He served as the school's dean from 1910 to 1923. He lived in the Colosseum, an apartment building near campus.

=== World War I ===
During World War I, Stone served for several months on a War Department Board of Inquiry, with Major Walter Kellogg of the U.S. Army Judge Advocate Corps and Judge Julian Mack, that reviewed the cases of 2,294 men whose requests for conscientious objector status had been denied by their draft boards. The Board was charged with determining the sincerity of each man's principles, but often devoted only a few minutes to interrogation and rendering a decision. Stone was impatient with men who took advantage of the benefits of life in America – using postage stamps was his example – without accepting the burdens of citizenship. In a majority of cases, the Board's subjects either relinquished their claims or were judged insincere. He later summarized his experience with little sympathy: "The great mass of our citizens subordinated their individual conscience and their opinions to the good of the common cause" while "there was a residue whose peculiar beliefs ... refused to yield to the opinions of others or to force." Nevertheless, he recognized the courage required to persist as a conscientious objector: "The Army was not a bed of roses for the conscientious objector; and the normal man who was not supported in his stand by profound moral conviction might well have chosen active duty at the front as the easier lot."

=== After the war ===
At the end of the war, he criticized Attorney General A. Mitchell Palmer for his attempts to deport aliens based on administrative action without allowing for any judicial review of their cases. During this time Stone also defended free speech claims for professors and socialists. Columbia soon became a center of a new school of jurisprudence, legal realism. Legal realists rejected formalism and static legal rules; instead, they searched for the experiential and the role of human idiosyncrasy in the development of law. Although Dean Stone encouraged the realists, he was condemned by Columbia President Nicholas Murray Butler as an intellectual conservative who had let legal education at Columbia fall "into the ruts."

In 1923, disgusted by his conflict with Butler and bored with "all the petty details of law school administration" that he dubbed "administrivia", Stone resigned the deanship and joined the prestigious Wall Street firm of Sullivan & Cromwell. He received a much higher salary and headed the firm's litigation department, which had a large corporation and estate practice (including J.P. Morgan Jr.'s interests). In full‑time private practice for only a brief time, Stone was considered a "hard‑working, solid sort of person, willing on occasion to champion the rights of mankind, but safe nevertheless."

=== Attorney general ===
On April 1, 1924, he was appointed United States Attorney General by his Amherst classmate President Calvin Coolidge, who felt Stone would be perceived by the public as beyond reproach to oversee investigations into various scandals arising under the Harding administration. These scandals had besmirched Harding's Attorney General, Harry M. Daugherty, and forced his resignation. In one of his first acts as Attorney General, Stone fired Daugherty's cronies in the Department of Justice and replaced them with men of integrity. As Attorney General, he was responsible for the appointment of J. Edgar Hoover as head of the Department of Justice's Bureau of Investigation, which later became the Federal Bureau of Investigation (FBI), and directed him to remodel the agency so it would resemble Britain's Scotland Yard and become far more efficient than any other police organization in the country. A pro‑active Attorney General, Stone argued many of his department's cases in the federal courts and launched an anti‑trust investigation of the Aluminum Company of America, controlled by the family of fellow cabinet member Andrew Mellon, Coolidge's Secretary of the Treasury.

In the 1924 presidential election, Stone campaigned for Coolidge's re‑election. He especially opposed the left-wing Progressive Party's candidate, Robert M. La Follette, who had proposed that Congress be empowered to reenact any legislation that had been struck down by the Supreme Court. Stone found this idea threatening to the integrity of the judiciary as well as the separation of powers.

== U.S. Supreme Court ==
=== Associate Justice ===
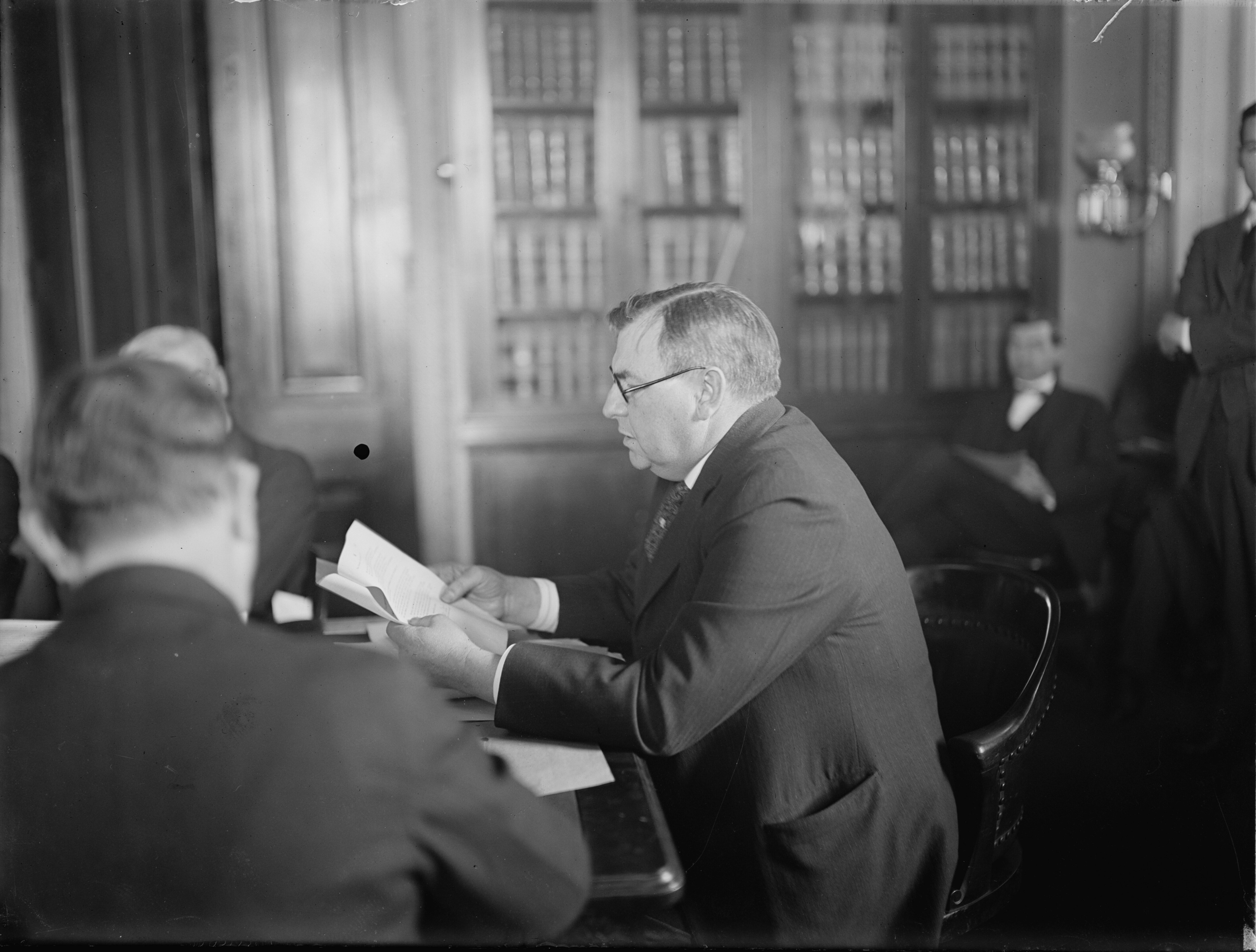
Stone testifying before the Senate Judiciary Committee during his Supreme Court confirmation process (January 28, 1925)

Shortly after the election, Justice Joseph McKenna retired from the Supreme Court, and on January 5, 1925, Coolidge nominated Stone to replace McKenna as an associate justice. His nomination was greeted with general approval, although there were rumors that Stone might have been kicked upstairs because of his antitrust activities. Some Senators raised questions about Stone's connection to Wall Street making him a tool of corporate interests. To quiet those fears, Stone proposed that he answer questions of the Senate Judiciary Committee in person. After holding one closed door hearing on January 12, 1925, where they heard testimony from Willard Saulsbury Jr., the committee gave Stone's nomination a favorable recommendation on January 21, 1925. The nomination was returned by the Senate to committee a few days later, and Stone became the first Supreme Court nominee to testify before the Senate Judiciary Committee hearings on their nomination on January 28, 1925. On February 2, 1925, the committee again gave his nomination a favorable recommendation. Stone was confirmed by the Senate on February 5, 1925, by a vote of 71–6, and received his commission the same day. On March 2, 1925, Stone, who would ultimately be Coolidge's only Supreme Court appointment, took the oath as an associate justice administered by Chief Justice William Howard Taft.

The Supreme Court of the mid‑1920s was primarily concerned with the relationships of business and government. A majority of the justices led by Taft were staunch defenders of business and capitalism free from most government regulation. The Court utilized the doctrines of substantive due process and the fundamental right of "liberty of contract" to oversee attempts at regulation by the national and state governments. Critics of the Court charged that the judiciary had usurped legislative authority and had embodied a particular economic theory, laissez faire, into its decisions. Despite the fears of progressives, Stone quickly joined the Court's "liberal faction", frequently dissenting with Justices Holmes and Brandeis and later, Cardozo when he took Holmes' seat, from the majority's narrow view of the police powers of the state. The "liberal" justices called for judicial restraint, or deference to the legislative will.

During the 1932 to 1937 Supreme Court terms, Stone and his colleagues Justices Brandeis and Cardozo were considered the Three Musketeers of the Supreme Court, its liberal or Democratic-aligned faction. The three were highly supportive of President Franklin D. Roosevelt's New Deal agenda, which many other Supreme Court Justices opposed. For example, he wrote for the court in United States v. Darby Lumber Co., 312 U.S. 100 (1941), which upheld challenged provisions of the Fair Labor Standards Act of 1938. Stone also authored the Court's opinion in United States v. Carolene Products Co., 304 U.S. 144 (1938), which, in its famous "Footnote 4", may have provided a roadmap for tiered scrutiny in the post-Lochner v. New York era.

=== Chief Justice ===
Stone's support of the New Deal brought him Roosevelt's favor, and on June 12, 1941, President Roosevelt nominated Stone to become chief justice, a position vacated by Charles Evans Hughes. Stone was Hughes’ personal choice for a successor. After it held a single hearing on Stone's nomination on June 21, 1941, the Senate Judiciary Committee gave his nomination a favorable recommendation on June 23, 1941. Stone was confirmed by a voice vote in the Senate on June 27, 1941, and received his commission on July 3, 1941. He remained in this position for the rest of his life.

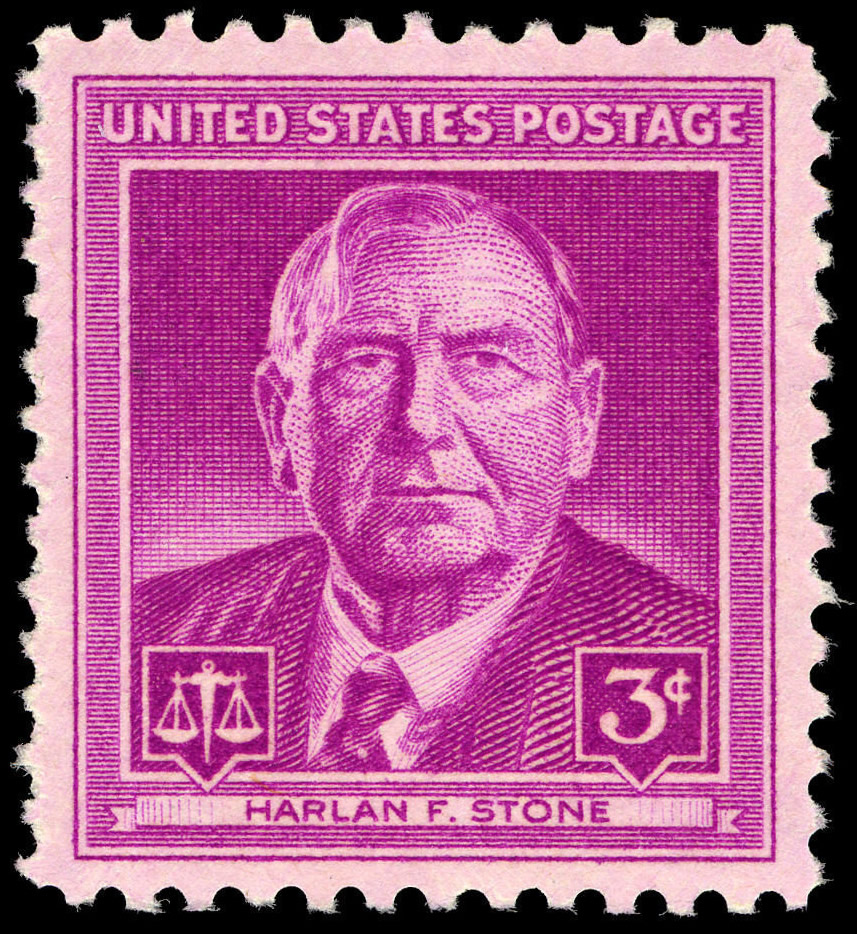
Harlan F. Stone commemorative stamp, issued in 1948

As chief justice, Stone spoke for the Court in upholding the President's power to try Nazi saboteurs captured on American soil by military tribunals in Ex parte Quirin, 317 U.S. 1 (1942). The Court's handling of this case has been the subject of scrutiny and controversy.

Stone also wrote one of the major opinions in establishing the standard for state courts to have personal jurisdiction over litigants in International Shoe Co. v. Washington, 326 U.S. 310 (1945).

As chief justice, Stone described the Nuremberg court as "a fraud" on Germans, even though his colleague and successor as associate justice, Robert H. Jackson, served as the chief U.S. prosecutor.

Stone was the fourth chief justice to have previously served as an Associate Justice and the second to have served in both positions consecutively. To date, Justice Stone is the only justice to have occupied all nine seniority positions on the bench, having moved from most junior associate justice to most senior associate justice and then to chief justice.

== Death ==
Stone was suddenly stricken while in an open session of the Supreme Court. He had just (or by some accounts not quite) finished reading aloud his dissent in Girouard v. United States. Justice Hugo Black called the Court into a brief recess, and physicians were called. Stone later died of a cerebral hemorrhage on April 22, 1946, at his Washington D.C. home.

=== Burial ===
Stone is buried at Rock Creek Cemetery in the Petworth neighborhood of Washington, D.C. His grave is near those of other justices, including Justice Willis Van Devanter, Justice John Marshall Harlan, and Justice Stephen Johnson Field.

== Other activities and legacy ==
Stone was a director of the Atlanta & Charlotte Air Line Railroad Company, president of the Association of American Law Schools, a member of the American Bar Association, and a member of the Literary Society of Washington for 11 years.

Stone was awarded an honorary Master of Arts degree from Amherst College in 1900, and an honorary Doctor of Laws degree from Amherst in 1913. Yale awarded him an honorary doctor of laws degree in 1924. Columbia and Williams each awarded him the same honorary degree in 1925. Amherst would later name Stone Hall in his honor, upon its completion in 1964.

Stone was elected to the American Academy of Arts and Sciences in 1933 and the American Philosophical Society in 1939.

Columbia Law School awards Harlan Fiske Stone Scholarships to students who demonstrate superior academic performance. Yale Law School awards the Harlan Fiske Stone Prize each fall to winners of the Morris Tyler Moot Court competition.

== Personal life ==
His brother was Winthrop Stone, president of Purdue University.

Stone married Agnes E. Harvey in 1899. Their children were Lauson H. Stone and the mathematician Marshall H. Stone.

== See also ==
- Demographics of the Supreme Court of the United States
- List of justices of the Supreme Court of the United States
- List of United States Supreme Court justices by time in office
- List of law clerks for the chief justice of the United States
- List of law clerks for the ninth seat of the Supreme Court of the United States
- United States Supreme Court cases during the Stone Court
- Justice Harlan Fiske Stone Bridge

Academic offices
Preceded by George Kirchwey	Dean of Columbia Law School; 1910–1923	Succeeded by Huger Jervey
Legal offices
Preceded by Harry Daugherty	United States Attorney General; 1924–1925	Succeeded by John Sargent
Preceded by Joseph McKenna	Associate Justice of the Supreme Court of the United States; 1925–1941	Succeeded by Robert Jackson
Preceded by Charles Hughes	Chief Justice of the United States; 1941–1946	Succeeded by Fred Vinson
