= Jervey =

Jervey is a surname. Notable people with the surname include:

- Caroline Howard Jervey (1823–1877), American author, poet
- Huger Jervey (1878–1949), American lawyer and law professor
- James Jervey (1785–1845), American lawyer, banker, and slave trader
- Patty Jervey (born 1964), American rugby union player
- Travis Jervey (born 1972), American football player
