= Anthony Triano =

American painter, sculptor, illustrator and teacher (1928–1997)

Anthony Thomas Triano (1928–1997) was a painter, sculptor, illustrator and teacher. His works feature natural forms, especially the human form, and tend toward the abstract. He exhibited in 37 one-man shows and numerous group shows.

His works can be viewed in collections, such as The Newark Museum, the Montclair Art Museum, the Lowe Museum in Coral Gables, the New York Lithographic Society, Abbott Laboratories, the Hartford Art Foundation, the Monmouth Historical Society, Johnson and Johnson, J.L. Hudson, House and Garden Magazine, Seton Hall University and Law School, the University of Alabama, William Paterson University, Wykeham Rise, the Golden Lemon on St. Kitts, the Library of Congress and Wuhan University in the People's Republic of China.

"My enterprise was inspired by the great sculptor Reuben Nakian from whom I inherited a rare insight of history, myth and art," Triano wrote in a brief autobiographical essay. "His most valuable gift to me were a total and passionate study of art of all ages, the importance of subject matter, a constant drawing style and the ultimate way of sculpting with terra cotta."

In 1971 Triano was appointed artist-in-residence at Seton Hall University and became a full-time professor the following year.

== Works ==
Dance of Life (1971) Oil. 48x72"
