= Virginia Berresford =

American painter

- Born: October 11, 1902; New Rochelle, New York
- Died: August 20, 1995 (aged 92); Martha's Vineyard, Massachusetts
- Education: Wellesley College; Teachers College, Columbia University; Art Students League
- Patrons: Charles Martin; Amédée Ozenfant

Virginia Berresford (October 11, 1902 – August 20, 1995) was a painter, printmaker, and art gallery owner. Her works are exhibited in major galleries.

== Early life and education ==
She was born Virginia Berresford in 1902 in New Rochelle, New York. She studied at Wellesley College in 1921, and Teachers College, Columbia University in 1923 with Charles Martin. She studied at the Art Students League, with George Bridgman. She studied in Paris, with Amédée Ozenfant from 1925 to 1930.

== Art career ==
Virginia Berresford has a variety of approaches and techniques. For instance : “Around 1950, she experimented with ‘circus net’ multi-media paintings on bone board using cloth/netting as a kind of stencil.”.

In the 1950s, she opened an art gallery in Edgartown, Martha's Vineyard.

Her work is included in the permanent collections of the Whitney Museum of American Art the Detroit Institute of Arts and the Dallas Museum of Art.

=== Exhibitions ===
- Third Biennial Exhibition of Contemporary American Painting, 1936, Whitney Museum of American Art
- Second Biennial Exhibition: Sculpture, Drawings and Prints, 1936, Whitney Museum of American Art
- Oil Paintings by Living Artists, 1935, Brooklyn Museum
- First Biennial Exhibition of Contemporary American Sculpture, Watercolors and Prints, 1933, Whitney Museum of American Art
- 46 Painters and Sculptors under 35 Years of Age, 1930, Museum of Modern Art, New York.

== Bibliography ==
- Virginia's journal: an autobiography of an artist, Glen Publishing Co., 1989
