= Daniel Abebe =

American lawyer

16th Dean of Columbia Law School
- Incumbent
- Assumed office August 1, 2024
- Preceded by: Gillian Lester

Personal details
- Education: Maryville University (BA); Harvard University (JD); University of Chicago (MA, PhD)
- Website: Official website

Daniel Y. Abebe is an American lawyer, law professor, and the 16th dean of Columbia Law School. Abebe joined Columbia Law School on August 1, 2024, as Dean and Lucy G. Moses Professor of Law. His research centers on the relationship between the constitutional law of U.S. foreign affairs and public international law. Previously, Abebe was Harold J. and Marion F. Green Professor of Law and Deputy Dean of the University of Chicago Law School and Vice Provost of the University of Chicago.

== Education ==
Abebe graduated summa cum laude from Maryville University of St. Louis in 1997. He earned a J.D. from Harvard Law School in 2000, then a M.A. (2006) and Ph.D. (2013) in political science from the University of Chicago.

== Career ==
Abebe clerked on the U.S. Court of Appeals for the Sixth Circuit for Judge Damon J. Keith, then worked at the law firm Cravath, Swaine & Moore before joining the faculty of the University of Chicago Law School in 2008. He was also affiliated with the University of Chicago political science department.

On June 17, 2024, Abebe was appointed Dean of Columbia Law School and Lucy G. Moses Professor of Law, effective August 1, 2024. With this appointment, Abebe became the first Black dean of Columbia Law School.

Abebe is an elected member of the American Law Institute. He serves on the board of the Higher Learning Commission and the Knight First Amendment Institute at Columbia University. He previously served as a member of the Board of Governors for Argonne National Laboratory, and as chair of the Board of Directors of Chapin Hall and the Board of Directors of the University of Chicago Charter School.

== Bibliography ==
Abebe, Daniel (2007–2008), "Not Just Doctrine: The True Motivation for Federal Incorporation and International Human Rights Litigation", Mich. J. Int'l L., vol. 29, p. 1

Abebe, Daniel (2009–2010), "Great Power Politics and the Structure of Foreign Relations Law", Chi. J. Int'l L., vol. 10, p. 125

Abebe, Daniel; Posner, Eric A. (2010–2011), "The Flaws of Foreign Affairs Legalism", Va. J. Int'l L., vol. 51, p. 507

Abebe, Daniel (2012), "One Voice or Many? The Political Question Doctrine and Acoustic Dissonance in Foreign Affairs", The Supreme Court Review, 2012: 233–254, doi:10.1086/670149, S2CID 225085116

Abebe, Daniel (2013), "Foreign Affairs Federalism: A Revisionist Approach", Vand. L. Rev., vol. 66, p. 723

Abebe, Daniel (2013), "The Global Determinants of U.S. Foreign Affairs Law", Stan. J. Int'l L., vol. 49, p. 1

Abebe, Daniel (2014–2015), "Egypt, Ethiopia, and the Nile: The Economics of International Water Law", Chi. J. Int'l L., vol. 15, p. 27
