= Lauson Stone =

American lawyer and civic leader

Lauson Harvey Stone (1904 in Manhattan – November 7, 1999 in Brooklyn), son of US Chief Justice Harlan Stone, was an American lawyer and civic leader.

Stone received a bachelor's degree in 1925 from Harvard University and a law degree in 1928 from Columbia University. He became a corporate lawyer with Sullivan & Cromwell, but found work at the large firm stifling, and left for a smaller practice. He resided in Brooklyn, where he was a trustee of the public library and of the Long Island College of Medicine.

In 1938 he was appointed by New York City Mayor Fiorello La Guardia to the Board of Higher Education, replacing Arthur M. Howe. La Guardia reappointed him for a second term, of nine years, in 1940. By the following year, he was chairman of the conduct committee for the Board, and was elected chairman of the administrative committee of Brooklyn College. His Board of Higher Education duties included leading the investigation for the Rapp-Coudert Committee into the extent of communist influence within the public schools.

He resigned his Board of Higher Education position in 1942 to enter the Army as a major. Later that year, he was assigned by the U.S. War Department to be a defense lawyer for eight Nazi saboteurs involved in Operation Pastorius. President Roosevelt had directed that the saboteurs be tried via a military tribunal; Lauson's designated role for the defense was to research whether this was constitutionally permissible. Lauson believed there was a strong possibility that a military trial was unconstitutional, and therefore the defense sought a Supreme Court order declaring as much. With the matter set to come before the Supreme Court as Ex parte Quirin, there was a question as to whether Lauson's father, Chief Justice Harlan Stone, would recuse himself from the case due to his son's involvement with the defense. Harlan did offer to do so, but his recusal was declined by Attorney General Francis Biddle, ostensibly because Lauson's involvement had been limited to the military tribunal, and he had been excused from the matters that were coming before the Supreme Court. Legal scholars have questioned this distinction, citing it as one example among many potential conflicts of interest produced by the case's unique circumstances.

In 1944, at age 41, Lauson was promoted to the rank of colonel, and he was later discharged at that rank, after being awarded the Legion of Merit Medal. He died at age 94 in Brooklyn.
