= Reuben Nakian =

American sculptor (1897-1986)

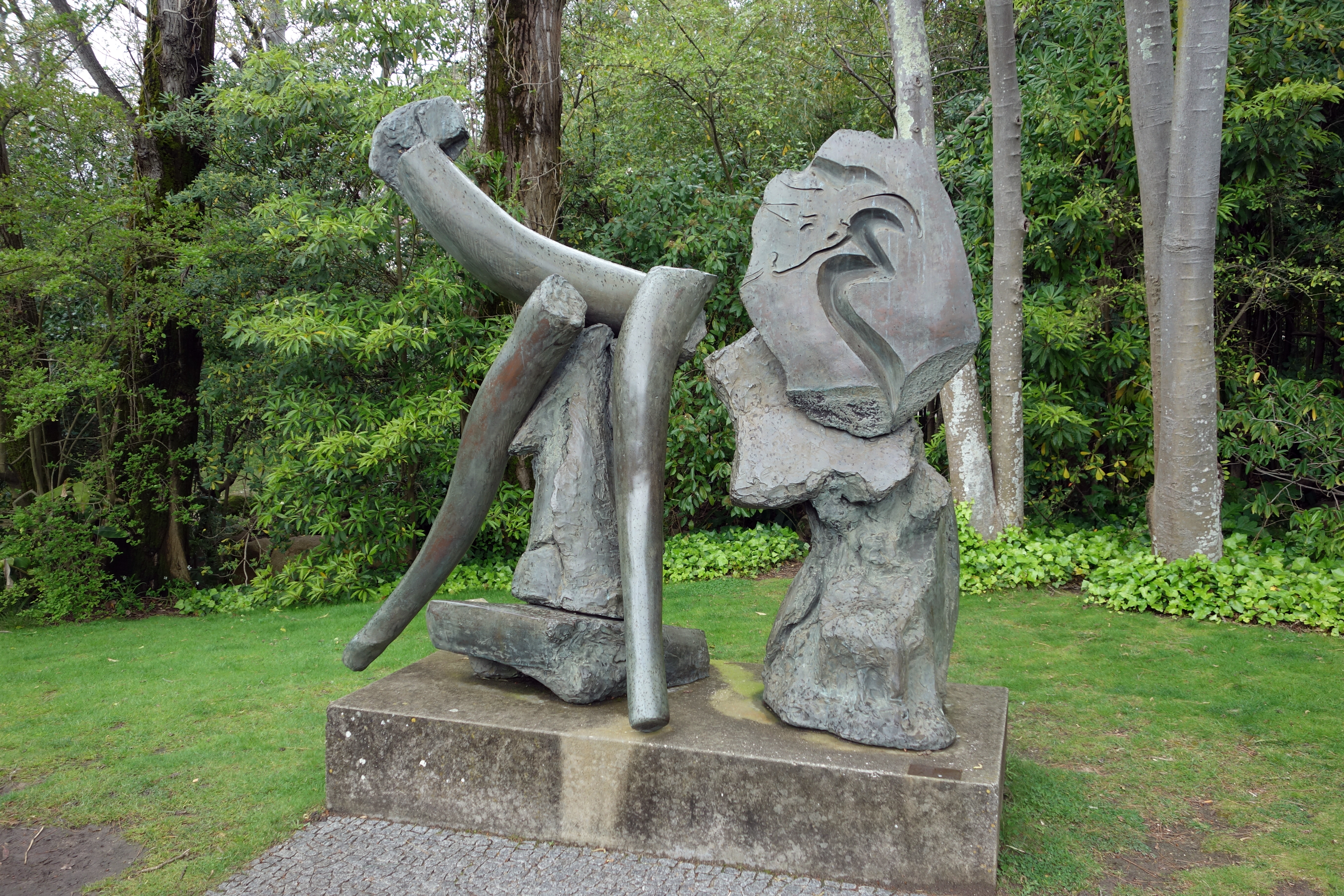
- Satyricon 1
- Born: August 10, 1897; College Point, New York, U.S.
- Died: December 4, 1986 (aged 89); Stamford, Connecticut, U.S.
- Known for: Sculpture

Reuben Nakian (August 10, 1897, College Point, New York – December 4, 1986, Stamford, Connecticut) was an American sculptor and teacher of Armenian extraction. His works' recurring themes are from Greek and Roman mythology. Noted works include Leda and the Swan, The Rape of Lucrece, Hecuba, and The Birth of Venus. He was also commissioned to create portraits of Roosevelt's cabinet in the 1930s.

== Biography ==
=== Early life ===
Reuben Nakian was born on August 10, 1897, in College Point, New York. In 1915, Nakian studied at the Independent School of Art in New York City—previously known as the Robert Henri School—with Homer Boss and A.S. Baylinson. Later he studied at the Art Students League of New York and was apprenticed to Paul Manship.

=== Career ===
He met and befriended painters Arshile Gorky and Willem de Kooning in the 1930s and Marsden Hartley and Marcel Duchamp in the 1940s. Poet Frank O'Hara was the curator of a major Reuben Nakian retrospective at New York City's Museum of Modern Art in 1966 where the artist was also exhibited in 1930. In the exhibition's catalog, O'Hara noted:

"Nakian is unrepressed, un-neurotic, unabashed in his approach to sensuality, however tortuous his esthetic commitment, and whether his subject be death, bestiality, or Arcadian dalliance. This explicitness gives the "Nymph and Satyr" plaques a marvelous joy and ease, the "Europa" terra-cottas a voluptuous dignity, and the "Leda and the Swan" drawings an almost comic abandon. Unlike most sexually oriented images in modern art, from Auguste Rodin to Andy Warhol, one finds no guilt or masochism in a Nakian. It is outgoing and athletic even in its releases and defeats: the satyr, the bull, the swan, the goat are each circumvented or absorbed by the goddess of his choice in the most choice of circumstances, that of his own choosing, like the amorous "dying" of the Elizabethans or the Metamorphoses of Ovid."

Later, he became close friends with composer, musician and sound designer, Fred Weinberg, who said:

"Reuben and I became very close friends since we are (were) both in the arts, lived down the street from each other and worked on our music, and art in our Stamford, Ct. country studios. As a composer, I would make tapes of the music Reuben loved, especially Classical.. When I traveled for out of town recording sessions, I would leave my parrots, Paco and Lucy with Ruben. He loved those two parrots which he called "birdbrains". Reuben stated upon my seeing Lucy do her 'business" on one of Reuben's sculpture "Reclining Man" "Its good for the patina!.".(I have some great pics of Ruben and myself with the birds.) When I recorded with George Burns in my Stamford, Ct. studio, I introduced the two to each other, and the "Tuesday Club" began- Sort of a "secret society", where we would partake in a few drinks of Bombay Gin...Ok, more than a few.. (Ruben commented on the interesting label of Bombay Gin). One day, near his death, I found him lying on the grass in his backyard, facing the sky and then he winked, and told me "The Gods are going to call me soon". Upon Reubens death, I wrote and performed a classical piece written for Ruben called "Tribute" performed at The Stamford Library."

His work is in the collections of DeCordova Museum and Sculpture Park, Fogg Art Museum, Honolulu Museum of Art, Smithsonian American Art Museum, Hirshhorn Museum and Sculpture Garden, Solomon R. Guggenheim Museum, Whitney Museum of American Art, Los Angeles County Museum of Art, Nassau County Museum of Art, Neuberger Museum of Art, Oklahoma City Museum of Art, The Delaware Art Museum, University of Arizona Museum of Art, University of Michigan Museum of Art, Guilford College Art Gallery, Saint Joseph College Art Gallery, Nelson-Atkins Museum of Art, Sheldon Art Gallery, Walker Art Center, National Gallery of Australia, Portland Art Museum, and the Boca Raton Museum of Art.

Nakian taught at Newark School of Fine and Industrial Arts from 1946 to 1951, and then once a week at Pratt Institute in Brooklyn from 1952 until about 1956. He also taught at the New York Studio School of Drawing, Painting and Sculpture (est. 1963).

=== Death ===
Reuben Nakian died on December 4, 1986, in Stamford, Connecticut.

== Books ==
- Marika Herskovic, New York School Abstract Expressionists Artists Choice by Artists (New York School Press, 2000); ISBN 0-9677994-0-6. pp. 33, 38, 262-5
