= Gillian Lester =

American academic

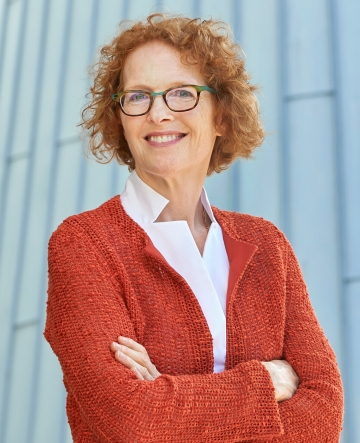

15th Dean of Columbia Law School
- In office January 1, 2015 – July 31, 2024
- Preceded by: David Schizer
- Succeeded by: Daniel Abebe

Personal details
- Born: October 30, 1964 (age 61) Maple Ridge, British Columbia, Canada
- Spouse: Eric Talley
- Education: University of British Columbia (BSc); University of Toronto (LLB); Stanford University (JSD)
- Website: Official website

Gillian L. L. Lester (born October 30, 1964) is a Canadian legal scholar who served as the 15th Dean of Columbia Law School. She joined Columbia Law School on January 1, 2015, as Dean and Lucy G. Moses Professor of Law, where she is now Dean Emerita and Alphonse Fletcher Jr. Professor of Law. Previously, Lester was acting dean of the University of California, Berkeley, School of Law where she had been a professor since 2006. Before that, she was a full professor at the School of Law of the University of California, Los Angeles.

Lester was the second female dean of Columbia Law School. Soon after taking the job, Lester told The Chronicle of Higher Education she wanted to tweak the curriculum to turn more Columbia law students into "global actors" and "entrepreneurs" who could build careers in both the private and public sectors.

== Early life and education ==
Lester was born in Maple Ridge, British Columbia, and later moved to West Vancouver. She is the youngest of four children born to Richard Egerton Matheson Lester, a labor lawyer, and Lois (Jensen) Lester, a teacher. She earned a B.Sc. in 1986 from the University of British Columbia, an LL.B. in 1990 from the University of Toronto, where she served as editor-in-chief of the University of Toronto Faculty of Law Review, and a J.S.D. in 1998 from Stanford University.

== Academic career ==
Lester began her career in the legal academy in 1994 at the University of California, Los Angeles School of Law. She became a full professor in 1999. She joined the Berkeley law faculty in 2006 and in 2014 became the Alexander F. and May T. Morrison Professor of Law and the Werner and Mimi Wolfen Research Professor. At Berkeley, Lester served as co-director of the Berkeley Center for Health, Economic and Family Security; Associate Dean for the J.D. Program and Curricular Planning; and, from 2013 to 2014, Acting Dean.

She has held external appointments as the Sidley Austin Visiting professor at Harvard Law School and the Sloan Fellow and visiting professor at Georgetown University Law Center, as well as short-term visiting appointments at the University of Southern California Gould School of Law, the University of Chicago Law School, and Radzyner Law School at Interdisciplinary Center Herzliya in Israel.

She serves on the board of directors for Legal Aid Society of New York and the International Society for Labour and Social Security Law. Lester is also a member of the Advisory Committee of the Labor Law Research Network and the American Law Institute and was an Advisor for the American Law Institute Restatement 3d Employment Law. She is also on the advisory board of the Columbia Law Review.

== Scholarship and recognition ==
Lester is a nationally recognized authority in employment law and policy. Her research has explored issues in the workplace and in public finance, distributive justice, and the design of social insurance programs. She is the author of numerous books and articles, including one of the leading casebooks on employment law, Employment Law Cases and Materials. She is also a member of the American Law Institute and was an adviser to the ALI Restatement of Employment Law. In April 2021, Lester was elected a member of the American Academy of Arts & Sciences.

== Personal life ==
Lester is married to Columbia Law School professor Eric Talley, with whom she has two children.

== Selected works ==
Books

- Philosophical Foundations of Labour Law, (Oxford U. Press, 2019) (with Hugh Collins and Virginia Mantouvalou)
- Employment Law: Cases and Materials, Fifth Ed. (Lexis-Nexis, 2012) (with Steven L. Willborn, Steven J. Schwab & John F.Burton)
- Employment Law: Selected Federal and State Statutes (Lexis-Nexis, 2012) (with Steven L. Willborn, Steven J. Schwab & John F.Burton)
- Family Security Insurance: A New Foundation for Economic Security (Workplace Flexibility and the Berkeley Center for Health, Economic and Family Security, 2010)
- Estreicher and Lester's Employment Law Stories (Foundation Press, 2010) (with Samuel Estreicher)
- Employment Law (Concepts and Insights) (Foundation Press, 2008) (with Samuel Estreicher)
- Jumping The Queue: An Inquiry Into The Legal Treatment Of Students With Disabilities (Harvard Press, 1997) (with Mark Kelman)

Articles and chapters

- "Age Discrimination and Labour Law in the United States," in Mia Ronnmar & Ann Numhauser-Henning (eds.), Age Discrimination In Labour Law (Kluwer Law International, 2015).
- "Keep Government Out of My Medicare": The Search for Popular Support of Taxes and Social Spending, in Michael Sherraden and Marion Crain (eds.) Working And Living In The Shadow Of Economic Fragility (Oxford U. Press, 2013)
- "Can Joe the Plumber Support Redistribution? Law, Social Preferences, and Sustainable Policy Design, in Tax Law Review (2011)
- "Beyond Collective Bargaining: Modern Unions and Social Solidarity," in Brian Langille and Guy Davidov (eds.), The Idea of Labor Law (Cambridge University Press, 2011)
- "Restrictive Covenants and Choice of Laws: An American Perspective," in Comparative Labor Law & Policy Journal (2010)
- "A Defense of Paid Family Leave" in Harvard Journal of Law & Gender (2005)
- "Unemployment Insurance and Wealth Redistribution" in UCLA Law Review (2001)
- "Careers and Contingency" in Stanford Law Review (1998)

Academic offices
Preceded by David Schizer	Dean of Columbia Law School; January 1, 2015 – June 30, 2024	Succeeded by Daniel Abebe
