= David Schizer =

American lawyer and academic (born 1968)

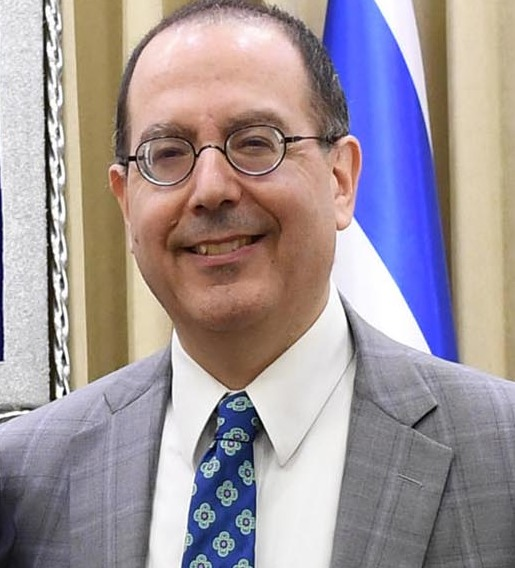
- Born: December 5, 1968 (age 57); Brooklyn, New York, U.S.

Academic background
- Education: Yale University (BA, MA, JD)
- Influences: Martin Ginsburg

Academic work
- Discipline: Tax law
- Institutions: Columbia Law School

David M. Schizer (born December 5, 1968) is an American lawyer and academic. He was named the fourteenth dean of Columbia Law School in 2004. He was appointed Dean at the age of 35, making him the youngest dean in the school's history. He served in this position until June 30, 2014. He went on to serve three years as the CEO of the American Jewish Joint Distribution Committee.

== Education and legal career ==
Schizer is a graduate of Yale University where he earned his B.A., M.A. and J.D. degrees. At Yale Law School, he was an editor of the Yale Law Journal. Schizer clerked for U.S. Supreme Court Associate Justice Ruth Bader Ginsburg for the 1994-95 term, and for Judge Alex Kozinski of the U.S. Court of Appeals for the Ninth Circuit from 1993-94 term. Schizer is a member of the Federalist Society.

Schizer worked at Davis Polk & Wardwell prior to joining the Columbia Law faculty in 1998. Schizer has occasionally been mentioned as a potential future United States Supreme Court nominee.

== Academic career ==
Schizer served as dean of Columbia Law School from 2004 to 2014. After serving as dean, Schizer became a tenured professor of law at Columbia Law School, where he taught a colloquium on tax. His research also focuses on energy law and corporate governance issues. Prior to his appointment as dean, Schizer served as the Wilbur H. Friedman Professor of Tax Law at Columbia Law School. For his ingenuity in the classroom, students awarded him the Willis L.M. Reese Prize for Excellence in Teaching in 2002.

== Publications ==
- Schizer, David M. (2023) How to Save the World in Six (Not So Easy) Steps: Bringing Out the Best in Nonprofits, Post Hill Press ISBN 9798888451885

== Personal life ==
Schizer practices Orthodox Judaism.

== See also ==
- List of law clerks for the sixth seat of the Supreme Court of the United States

Academic offices
| Preceded by David Leebron | Dean of Columbia Law School; 2004–2014 | Succeeded by Gillian Lester |
