= Charles James Martin (artist) =

American modernist artist and arts instructor

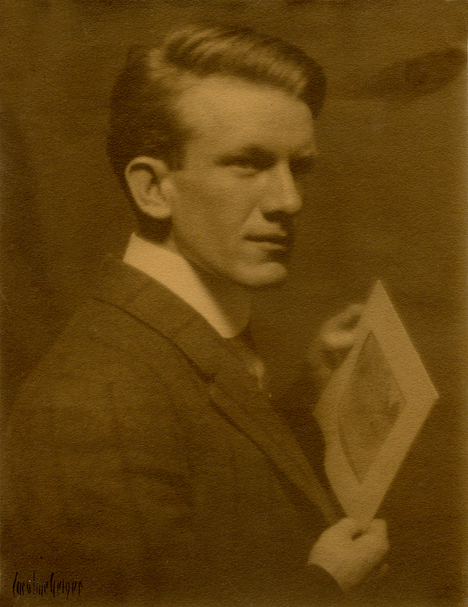
- Charles James Martin, photographed by Caroline Geiger, circa 1910.
- Born: September 1886; Mansfield, England
- Died: August 9, 1955 (aged 68); Hyannis, Massachusetts, United States
- Known for: Painting

Charles James Martin (September 1886 – August 9, 1955) born originally in Mansfield, England, emigrated and became a British American modernist artist and arts instructor. He worked in a variety of media including etching, lithography, water color, monotype, linocut, woodcut, oil, photography, mezzotint and silversmithing.

== Biography ==
Born in Mansfield, England, in 1886, Martin emigrated to the US as a boy and lived out the remainder of his life as an American. He studied art under Arthur Wesley Dow at Dow's Ipswich Summer School of Art as well as at Columbia University Teachers College, where he became an instructor himself in 1914.

Mr. Martin's work is after the new modernist school, the art that seeks essence rather than form, interpretation rather than faithful representation. The results of this first year's training in a type of work so entirely new to Teachers College students are highly gratifying to Professor Dow. According to Mr. Martin, modernist painting must be preceded by ordinary symmetrical drawing by the student. In other words, rules must be learned before they can be departed from. The exhibit showed, therefore, not only paintings of this new character, but also drawings of the old style – symmetrical, detailed, precise. One of the color experiments of particular interest in this interpretative painting is that of "optical mixtures," a process by which the mixing of colors to produce another color, is left to the eye, rather than mixed on the palette; green foliage, for example, may be represented by intermingling splotches of blue and yellow. The exhibit showed these modernist studies done in all mediums – oil, chalk, tempora, water color.

Martin attained professorship at Teachers College in 1923 and continued his work there into the 1940s. Georgia O'Keeffe attended Martin's class at Teachers college in 1914–15, where she met Anita Pollitzer. O'Keeffe considered Martin's instruction significant enough that she continued sending examples of her work for his critique in the period after she attended his class. Martin even had a fan in Winston Churchill, as a friend of his writes in a letter c. 1930s:

Wednesday afternoon Mr. and Mrs. Winston Churchill and two sons came in for tea; both Mr. and Mrs. C. are crazy about sketching and water colors. Mr. C. went back to [Charles'] picture three times and stood for ages admiring and commenting upon it – thought the light and shadows perfect and loved the simplicity of the theme. I always feel so proud to say "our friend Prof. Martin!"

In the 1910s, Martin also studied photography with Clarence H. White at Teachers College, and became an instructor at White's School of Photography in 1918. Also in 1918, Martin won first prize in a photography contest held by Columbia University in which Dow and White were judges. During this time period, he also served on the executive committee of the Pictorial Photographers of America .

Martin spent many summers in the 1920s–50s living and teaching plein air art classes in Provincetown, Mass, and also in Mexico. Martin continued working as an art instructor, often on a freelance basis, for the remainder of his life. He died on August 9, 1955, in Hyannis, Massachusetts, after a short illness. He is buried at North Burial Ground, Providence, Rhode Island.

== Personal life ==
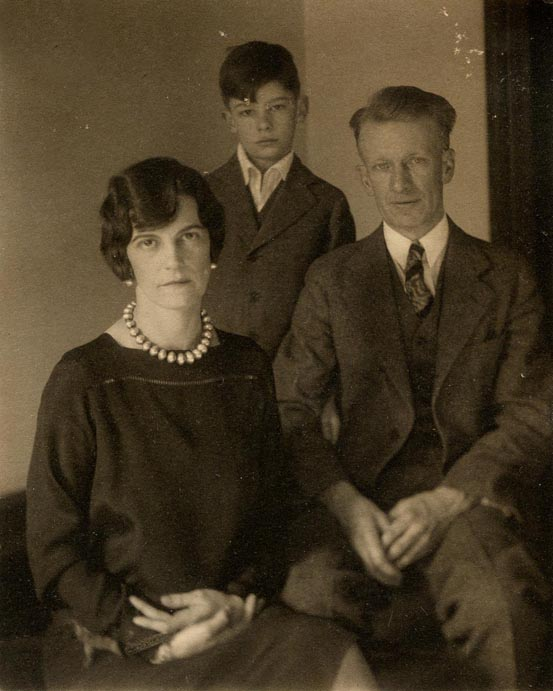
Charles J. Martin with wife Esther and son James, circa late 1920s

At Teachers College, Martin met a fellow art student named Esther L. Upton, whom he eventually married. Upton was the niece of Clifford B. Upton and Siegried M. Upton, both prominent instructors at Teachers College and also the affiliated Horace Mann School. (Mrs. Upton was also an accomplished photographer who studied with Clarence H. White.) Charles and Esther lived for a brief time in Paris, France in 1913–14. In 1918 they gave birth to their only child, James Upton "Kimo" Martin (born May 16, 1918, died Jan 20, 2007) . Charles and Esther eventually separated, and spent most of the 1920s onward living far apart from each other. James spent time living with both of his parents. He grew up to become an accomplished artist and furniture designer in his own right.

== Selected exhibitions and reviews ==
- American Water Color Society Exhibition, National Arts Club, 1916

There are two "Interiors" in the exhibition which provide contrast and text. One shall be nameless... The other is a picture by Charles J. Martin in the alcove. Mr. Martin has approached his subject first of all in the spirit of an artist with analyses to make. He has taken the haphazard of nature and reduced it to orderly plan. Or to speak more truly, he has taken the fragment of nature that presented itself to him at some one moment and recreated it until by virtue of art it became a whole, an organism, in which every part is essential to the others. He has seen his room as a pattern in which the black stove with its aggressive pipe is balanced by a black chair or something, and beautiful bright threads of color run in and out of large neutral patches of violet and dull yellow. A rug designer would see how handsome it is. But the artist in this instance has had also a sense of humor and a conscience, and since his room is a human abode he has analyzed its character and made of his work a witty and penetrating comment. That is what makes it so difficult to forgive. The makers of patterns are not all so successful as Mr. Martin.

- Columbia Teachers College, 1916

Mr. Martin's method makes water color a thing to reckon with at a distance, a medium capable of decorative effect. He pays tribute to the peculiar character of the medium, its sparkling idiosyncrasy, by his use of the white outline, which detaches the masses of color from one another, keeping them in one plane as effectively as the black bounding line in favor with one school of modern painters; and which has the advantage of giving the white ground of the paper a chance to play its enlivening part in the general scheme.

- Philadelphia Water Color Exhibition, 1916
- MacDowell Club Sketch Exhibition, 1917
- Pictorial Photographers of America Exhibition, Detroit Museum of Art, January 4–28, 1918
- Painter-Gravers Of America Exhibition, 1919
- Provincetown Art Association Exhibition, 1927

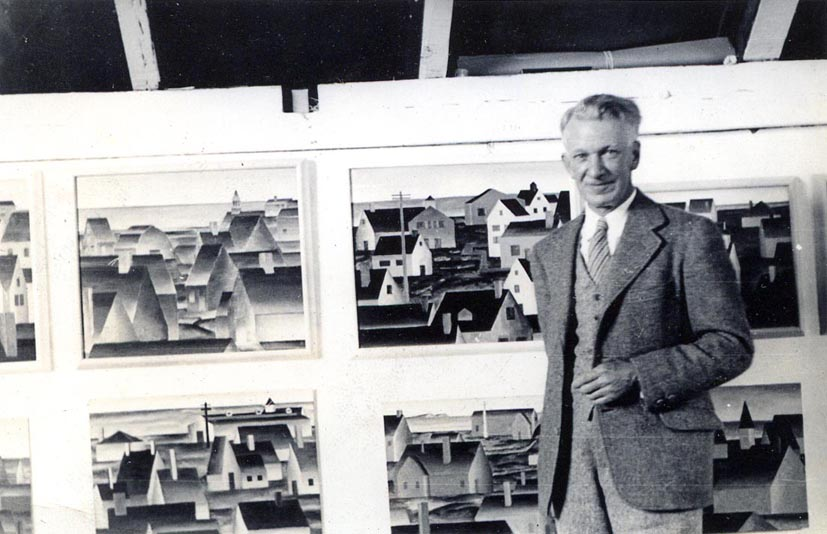
Charles J. Martin with water colors, circa 1930s

- Morton Galleries, New York City, 1929
- International Water Color Exhibition, Art Institute of Chicago, May 2 – June 2, 1929
- Provincetown Art Association Exhibition, 1931
- Morton Galleries, New York City, 1931

Charles J. Martin, well known for his freedom from academic restraint in his method of teaching design, achieves an equally unhampered expression in his creative work. "The Factory" is a boldly conceived design, especially rich in its use of resonant blacks. In contrast to the rugged construction of this work is the fluent character of the "Sand Pit," where the harmonic tour de force of combining warm and cold tonalities is skillfully accomplished.

- Morton Galleries, New York City, 1932.

Possibly the most striking paper in the show is the landscape by Charles Martin. Mr. Martin, a professor of painting at Columbia, has an original and powerful technique. He achieves architectonic pattern without any important loss in realism.

- Morton Galleries, New York City, 1933
- Morton Galleries, New York City, 1934
- Delphic Studios, New York City, 1934
- Brooklyn Museum, Brooklyn, NY, 1935 "Exhibition of Water Color Paintings, Pastels and Drawings by American and European Artists, Feb 1-28, 1935
- Morton Galleries, New York City, 1936
- Morton Galleries, New York City, 1937
- Morton Galleries, New York City, 1938
- Brooklyn Museum Art School, 1949

== Selected teaching CV ==
- Columbia University Teachers College (1914–1940s)
- Clarence H. White School of Photography (1918–1920s)
- Art Students' League (early 1920s)
- Textile Guild of the Keramic Society of Greater New York (early 1920s)
- New York High School (1927 seminars for art instructors)
- Evander Childs High School (1927 seminars for art instructors)
- Skidmore College (1928)
- University of Chicago (1929)
- Eastern Arts Convention, Philadelphia (1940)
- War Veteran's Art Center, Museum of Modern Art (1940s)

== Selected publications ==
- Notes On Permanent Painting, a 1924 article for Teachers College Record.
- Creative Design In Painting, a 12-minute 16 mm educational film, 1936. "A demonstration of the organization of lines and areas within a rectangle. The illustration of these design principles is then carried over into the painting of a landscape in watercolor."
- How To Make Modern Jewelry, New York : Museum of Modern Art : distributed by Simon and Schuster, 1949.

== Gallery of selected art works ==
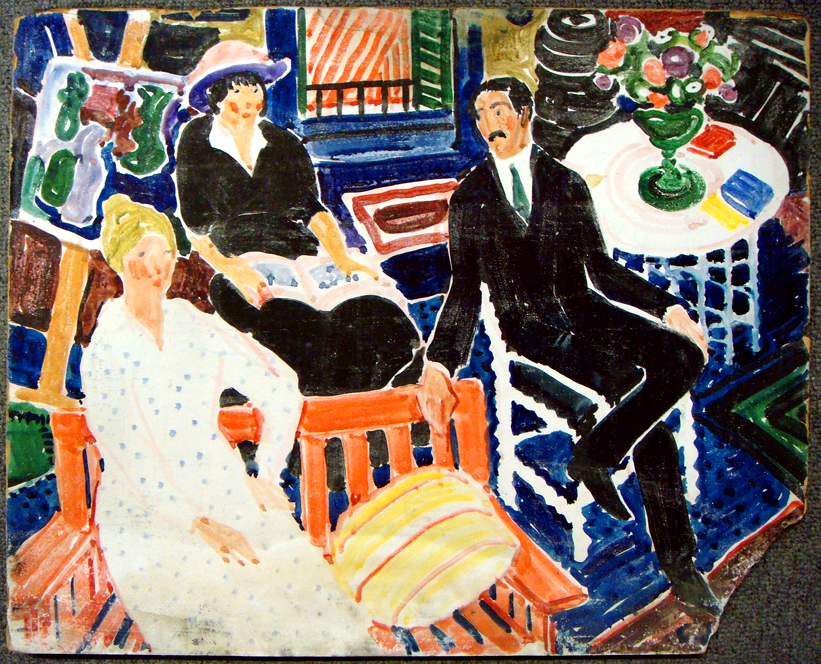
Water Color: "An Interior," 1916

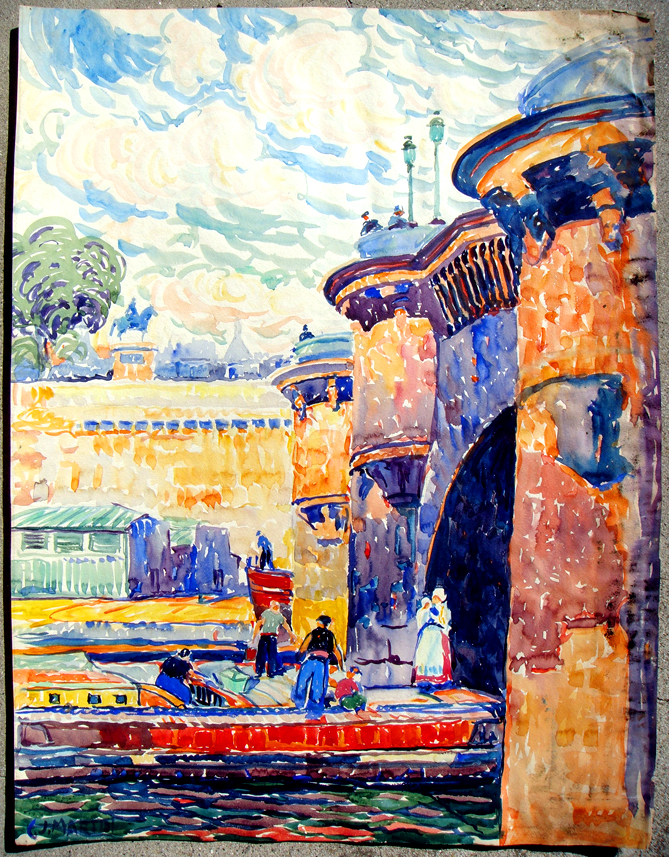
Water Color: Canal scene, c. 1913

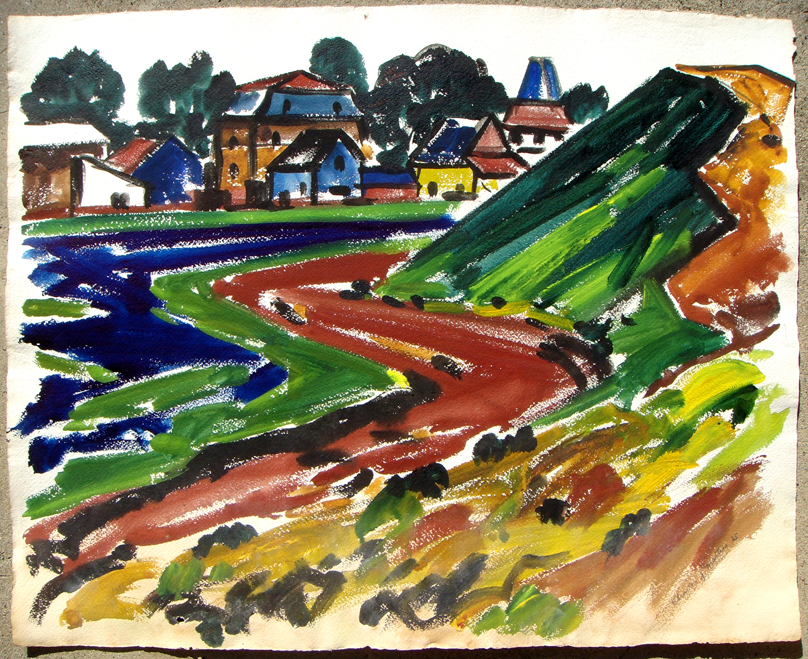
Water Color: Landscape, c. 1930s

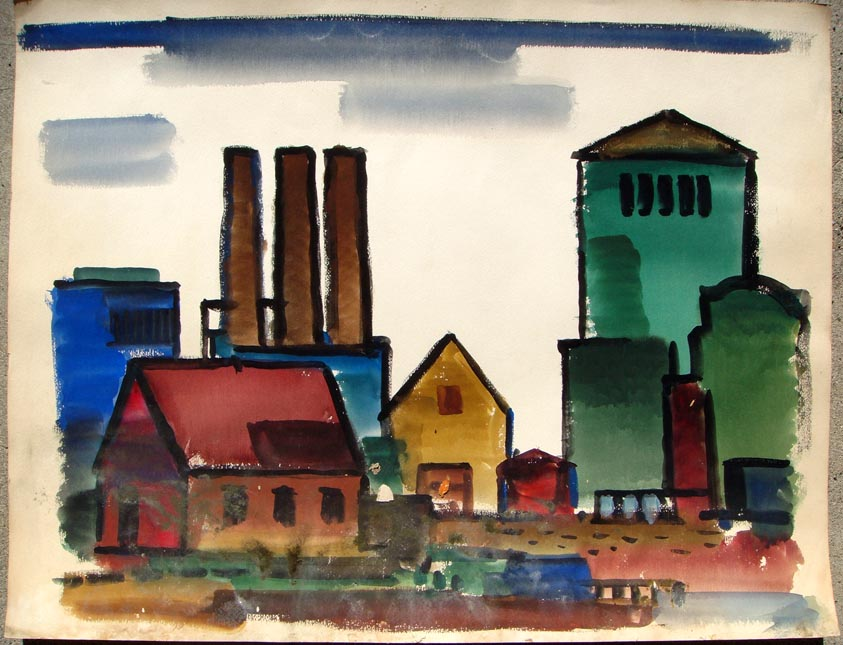
Water Color: Factory, c. 1930s

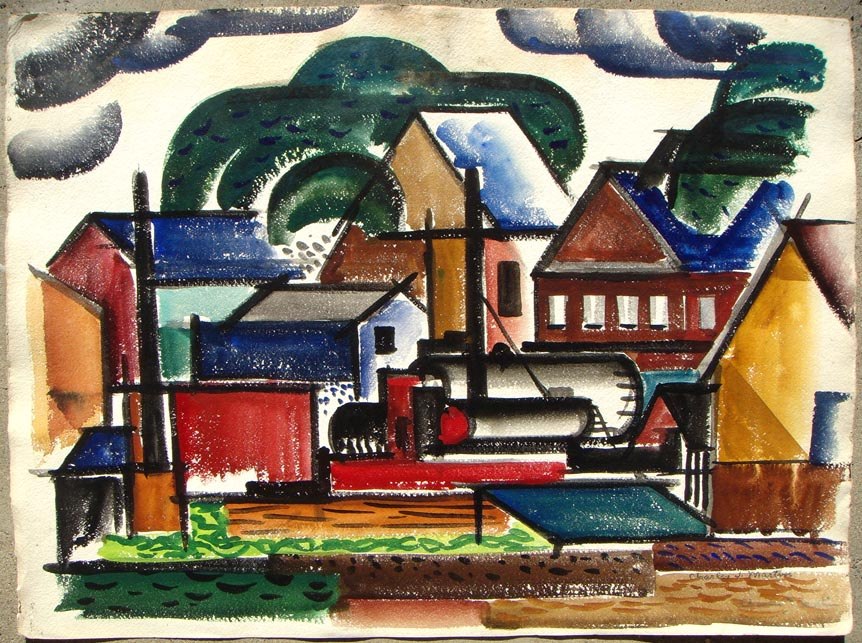
Water Color: Buildings with Tank, c. 1930s

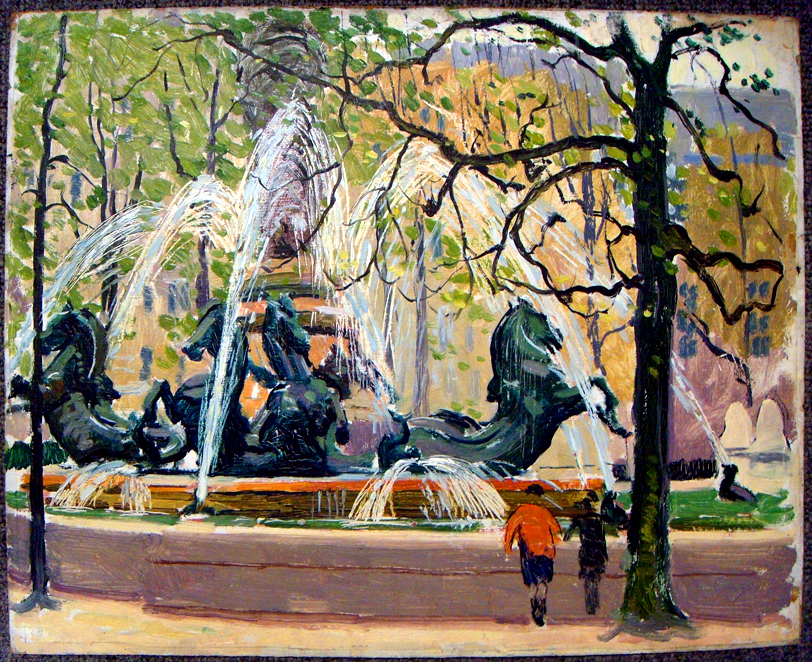
Oil Painting: Horse Fountain, c. 1913

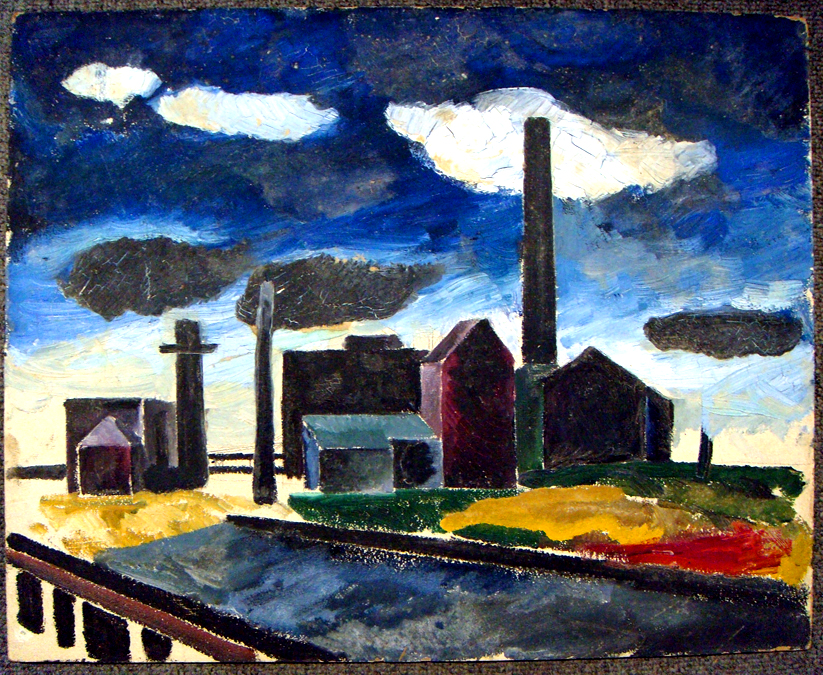
Oil Painting: Factory, c. 1913

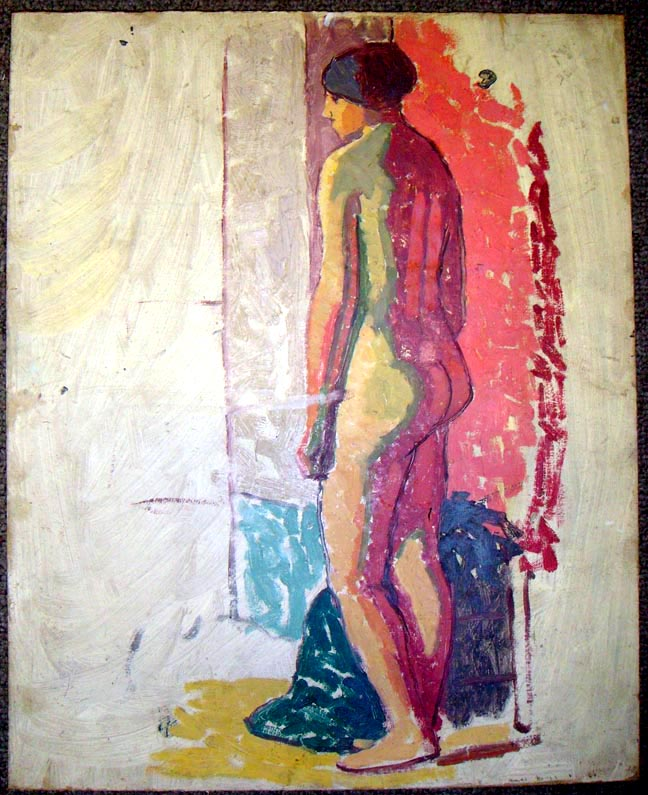
Oil Painting: Nude, c. 1913

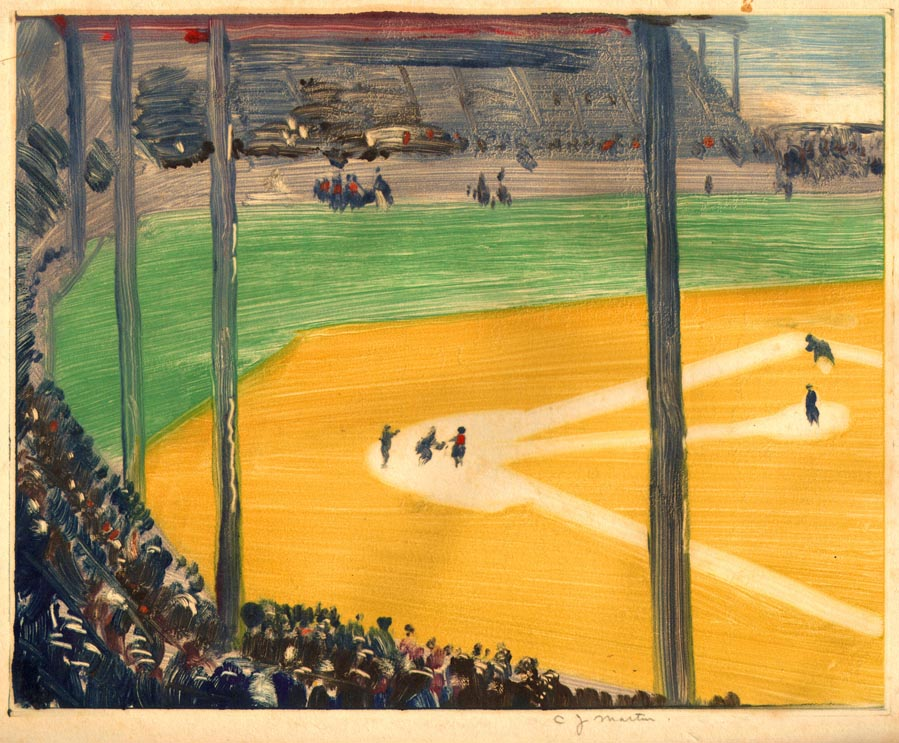
Monotype: Baseball Game, c. 1918

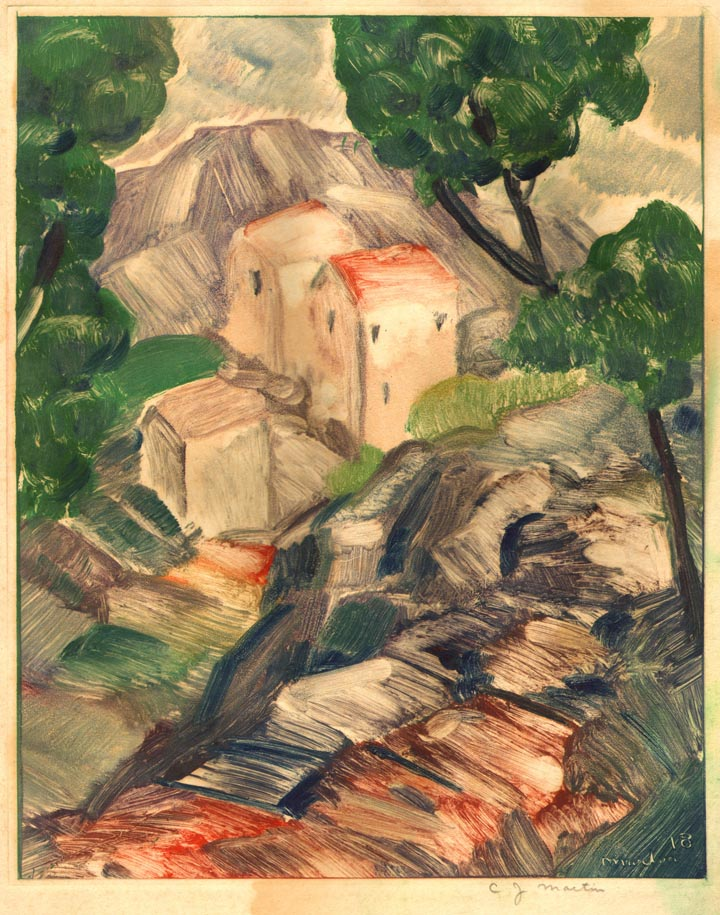
Monotype: Houses, 1918

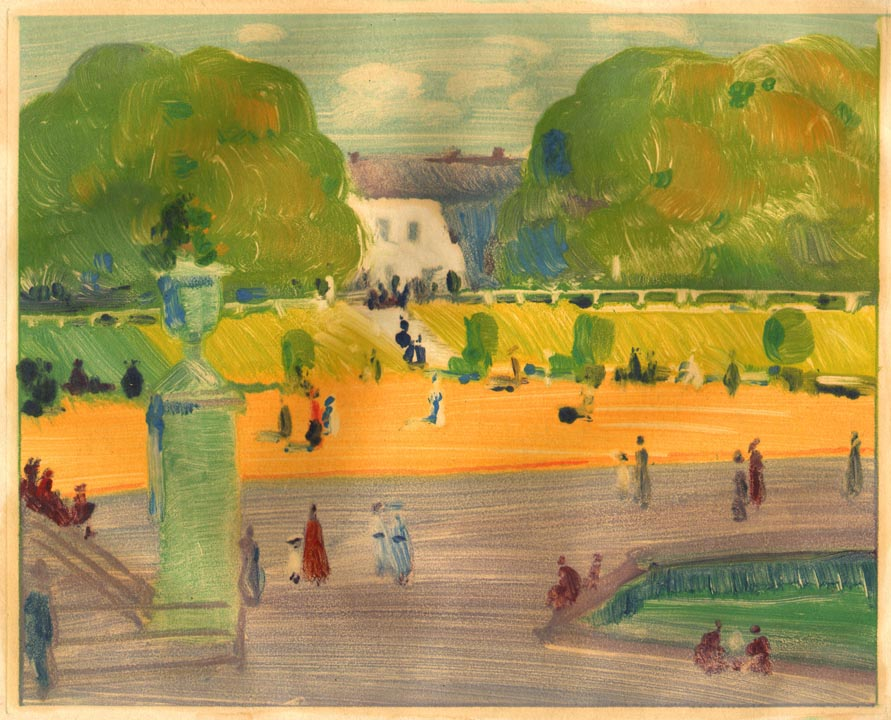
Monotype: Plaza Scene, c. 1918

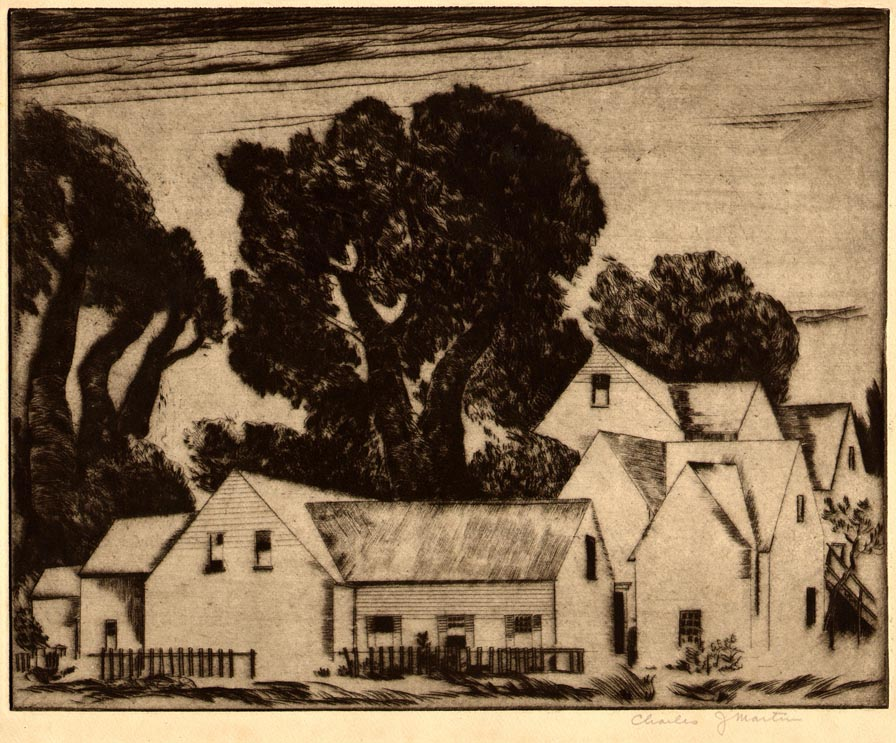
Etching: Houses & Trees, c. late 1910s

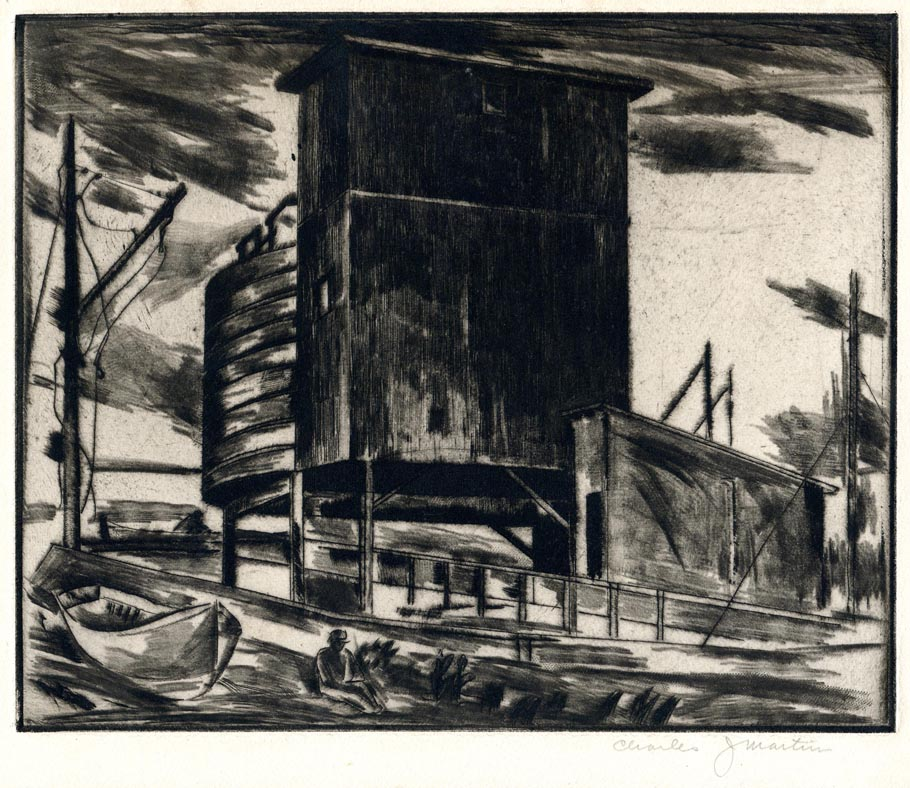
Etching: Tanks, c. late 1910s

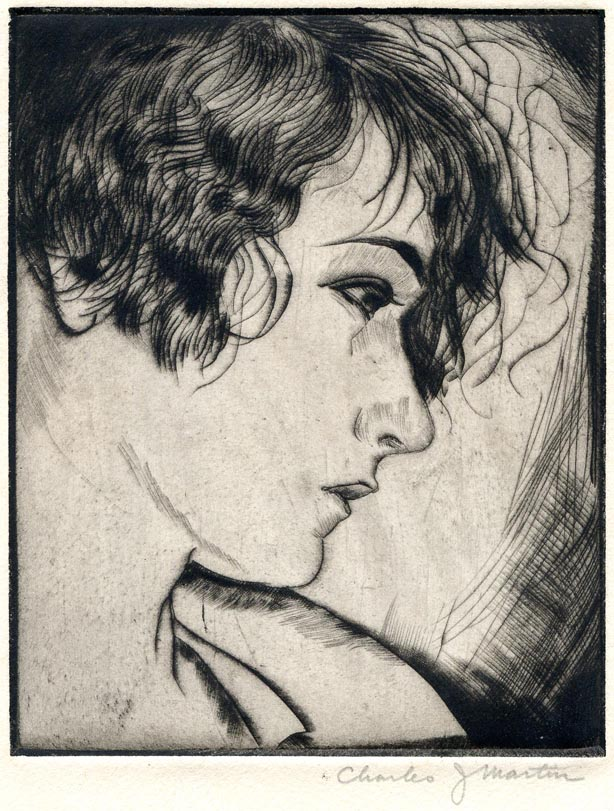
Etching: Esther L. Martin, c. late 1910s

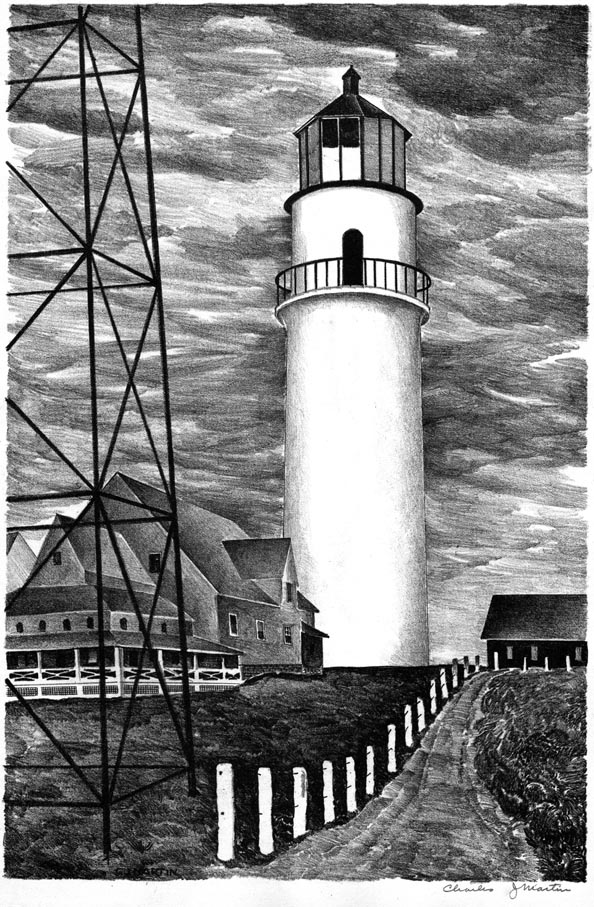
Lithograph: Highland Light, North Truro, MA, c. late 1920s

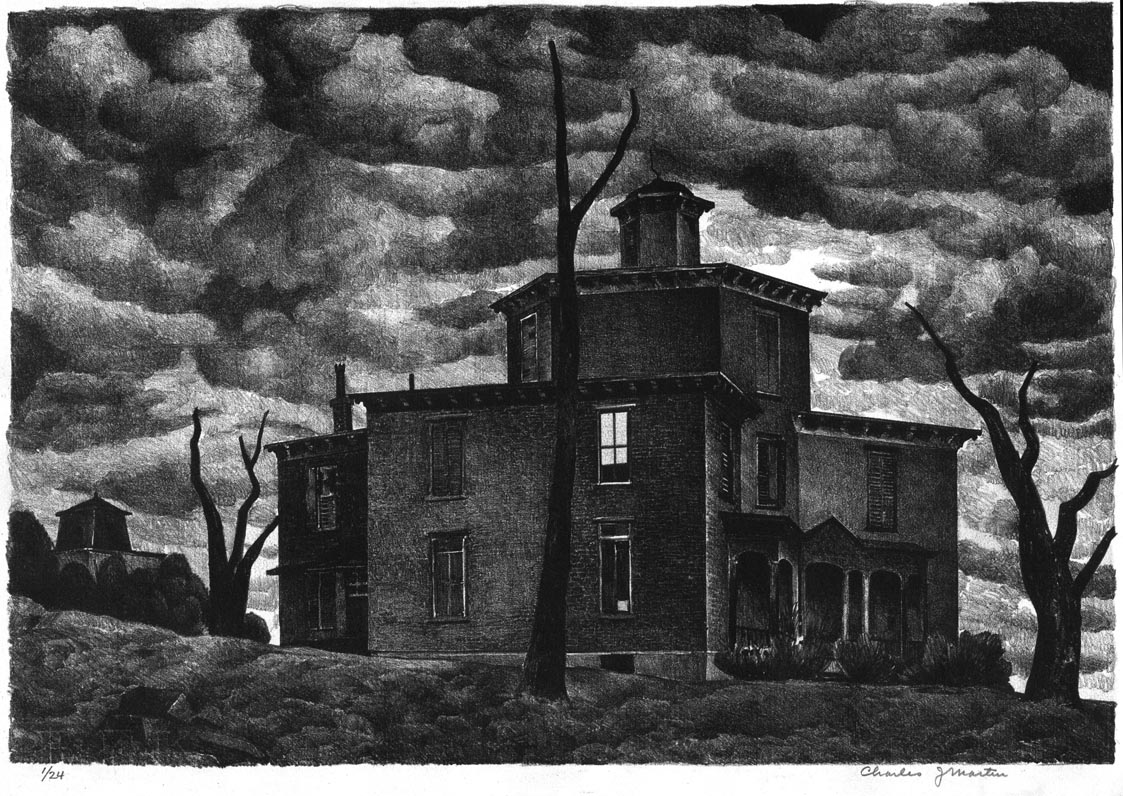
Lithograph: Octagon House, c. late 1920s

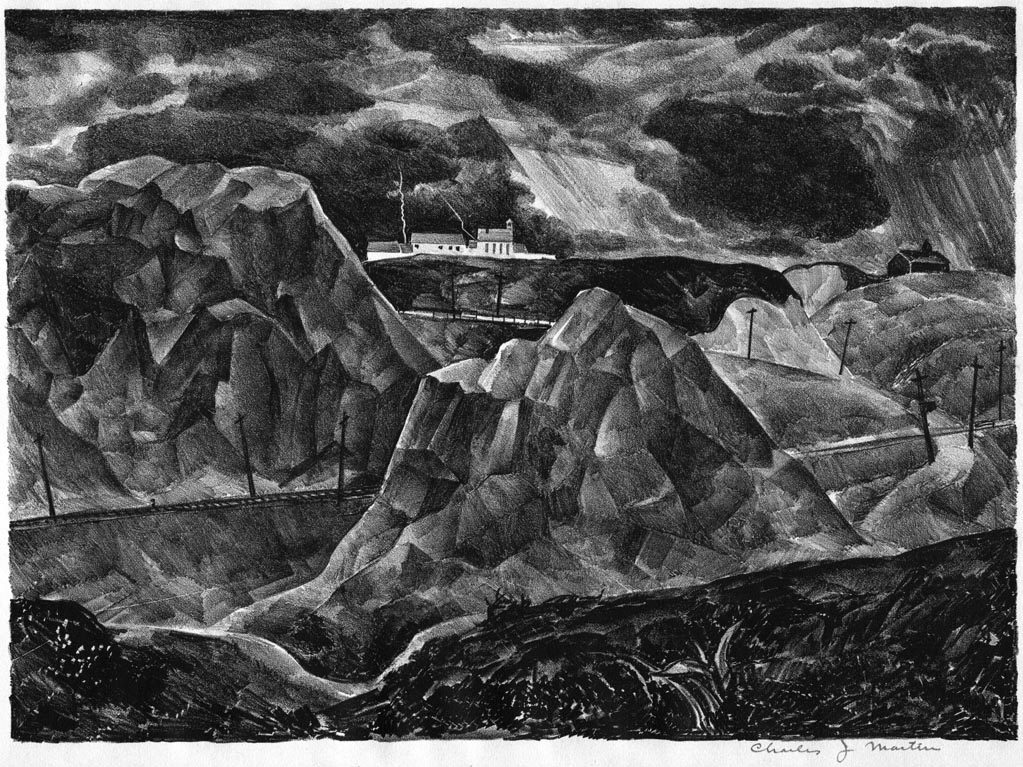
Lithograph: Storm Landscape, c. late 1920s

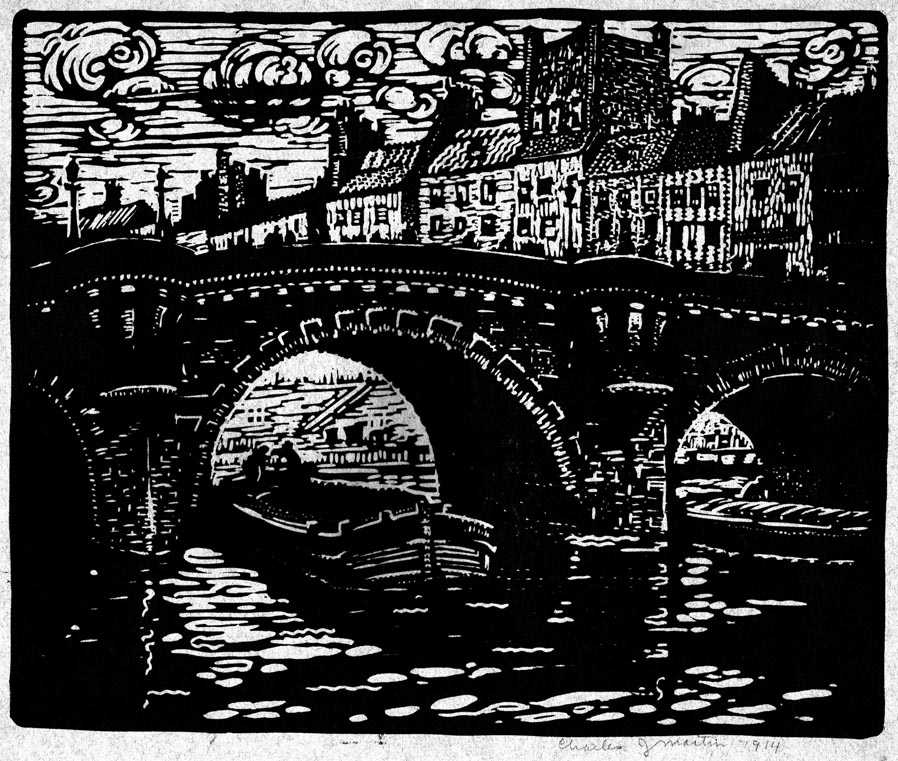
Linocut: Canal Scene, 1914

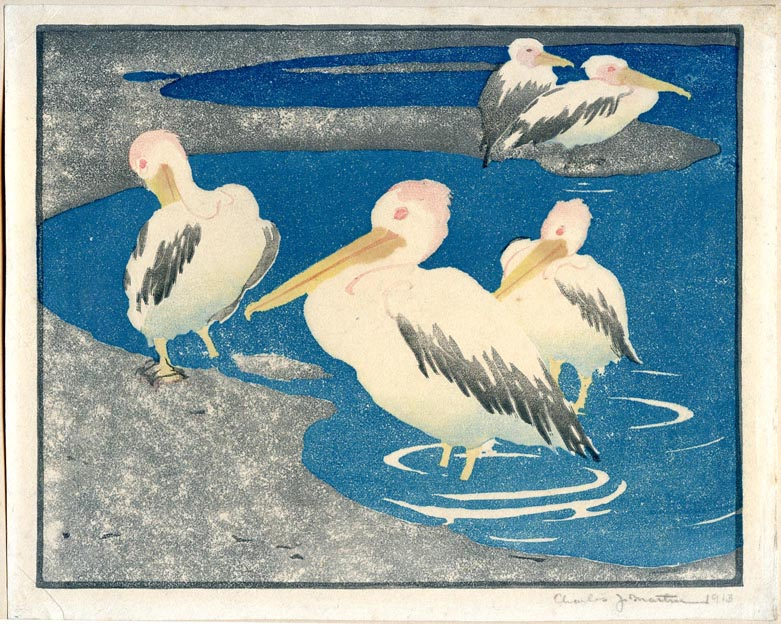
Color Woodcut: Pelicans, 1913

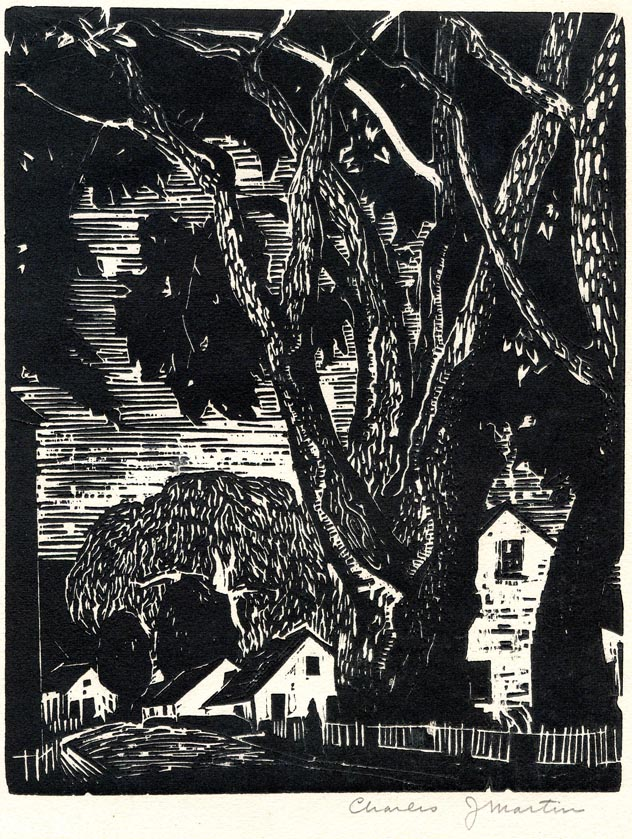
Woodcut: Trees & Houses, c. 1920

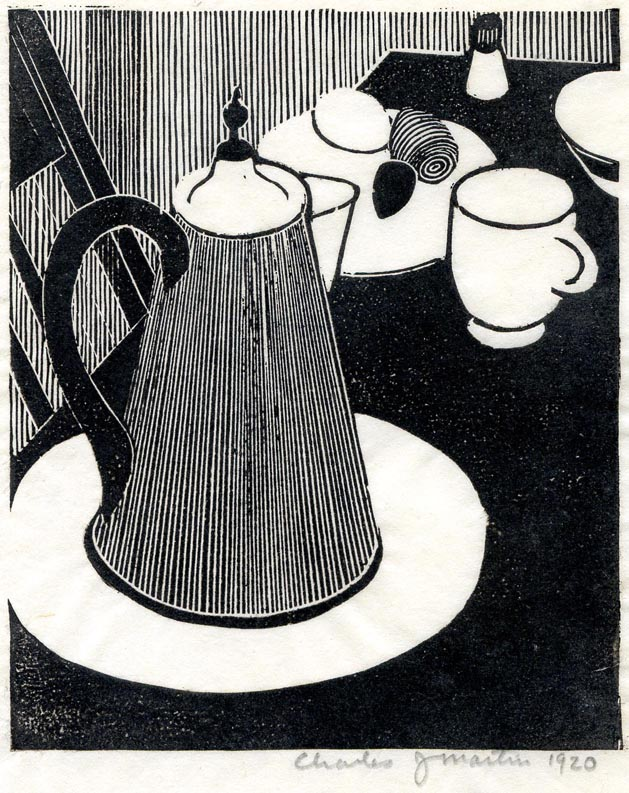
Woodcut: Tea Service, 1920

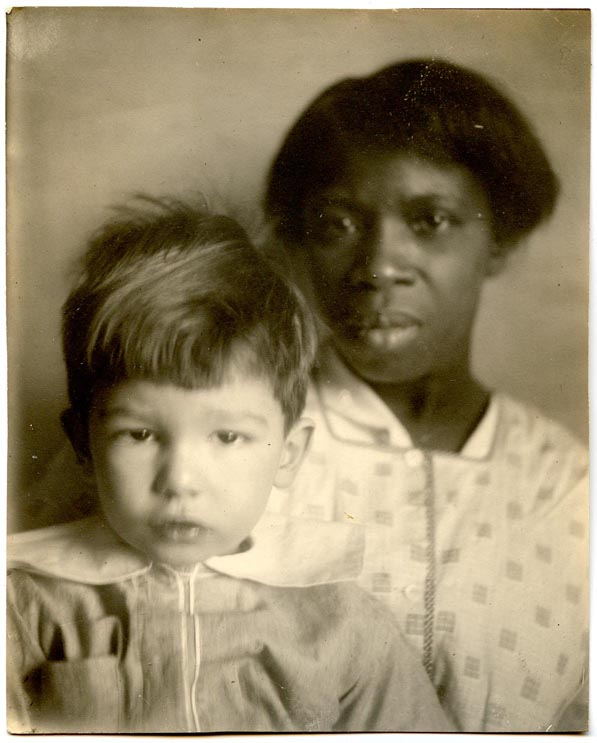
Photograph: James U. Martin with Nanny, 1921

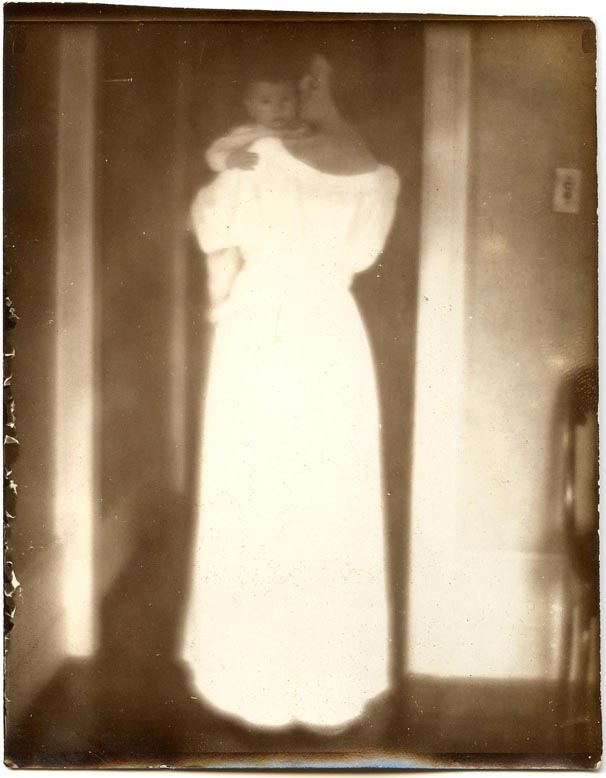
Photograph: Esther L. Martin holding James U. Martin, c. 1919

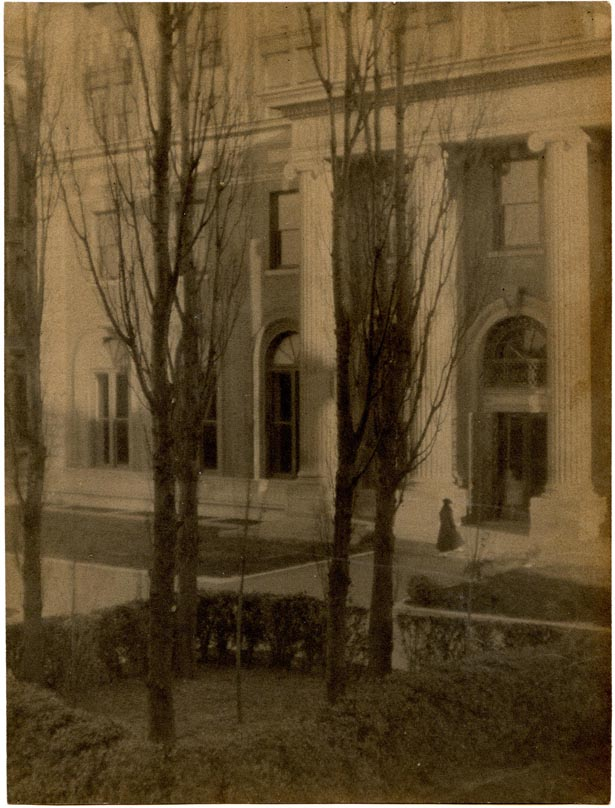
Photograph: Columbia University Scene, 1918

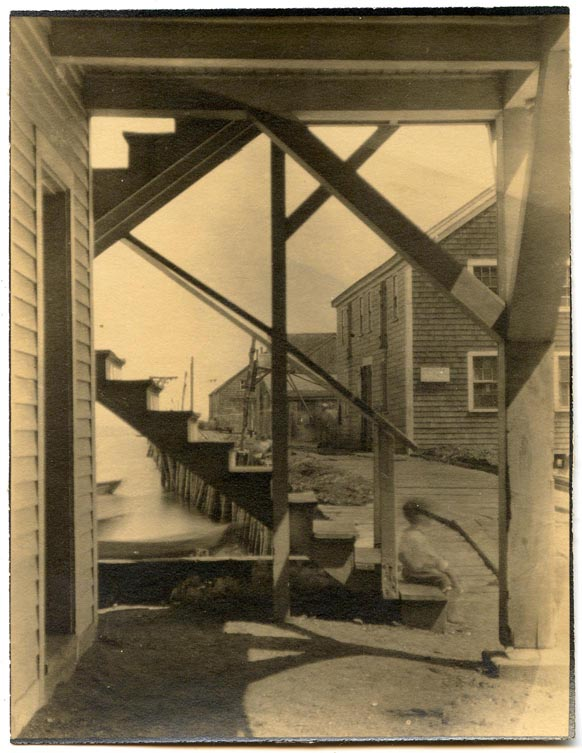
Photograph: Dockside Buildings with James U. Martin, c. early 1920s
