= Huger Jervey =

American lawyer, professor, and college dean

Huger W. Jervey (September 20, 1878 – July 27, 1949) was an American lawyer, professor, and dean of Columbia Law School. Jervey assumed the position as dean at Columbia Law after Harlan F. Stone in 1924. He resigned from the position in 1928. He was a professor of law at Columbia from 1923 to 1949, and also became the head of Columbia's Parker School of Foreign and Comparative Law in 1931.

== Early life ==
Jervey was a native of Charleston, South Carolina. He attended college at Charleston College and the University of the South. He graduated from the University of the South in 1899 and received his masters in 1900. He then studied Greek at Johns Hopkins University.

== Career ==
Jervey taught Greek as an assistant professor at the University of the South until 1909. The next year he entered Columbia Law School where he served as editor of the Columbia Law Review.

Jervey served in the U.S. Army in France during World War I and later with the General Staff Corps of the Army. He became a professor of law at Columbia Law in 1923.

At his induction as dean of Columbia Law School U.S. Attorney General Harlan F. Stone spoke.

== Legacy ==
The National Portrait Gallery has a painting of Jervey by Deane Keller.

Academic offices
Preceded by Harlan Fiske Stone	Dean of Columbia Law School; 1923 - 1927	Succeeded by Young Berryman Smith
