= A. S. Baylinson =

Russian-American painter

Abraham Solomon Baylinson
- A. S. Baylinson with self-portrait painting, 194?. Unidentified photographer. A. S. Baylinson papers, Archives of American Art, Smithsonian Institution.
- Born: Abraham Solomon Baylinson; 6 January 1882; Moscow, Russia
- Died: 6 May 1950 (aged 68); New York, New York
- Education: Art Students League of New York; National Academy of Design
- Known for: Painting

Abraham Solomon Baylinson (6 January 1882 – May 1950) was a Russian-American painter who was active in the early modernist movement.

== Early life and education ==
Born in Moscow, Russia on 6 January 1882, the Baylinson family moved to the United States around 1892. Baylinson studied at the Art Students League of New York the National Academy of Design and the New York School of Art. While at the New York School of Art he trained under Robert Henri and alongside students such as Edward Hopper, Rockwell Kent, Yasuo Kuniyoshi, Glenn Coleman, Eugene Speicher, and Patrick Henry Bruce. He also studied under Homer Boss.

== Artistic career ==
He was secretary for the Society of Independent Artists from 1918 to 1934, and showed his work at the Society's shows from his joining in 1917 until 1942. Baylinson was an instructor of drawing and painting at the Art Students League from 1931 to 1933. In early 1931 a fire destroyed almost twenty years of work related to Baylinson's career. When he began painting after the fire his style had evolved into representational art.

He died on 6 May 1950 in New York City.

== Notable exhibitions ==
- Art Institute of Chicago
- Corcoran Gallery of Art
- Detroit Institute of Art
- National Gallery of Canada
- Pennsylvania Academy of Fine Art
- Whitney Museum of American Art

== Notable collections ==
- Metropolitan Museum of Art
- Museum of Fine Arts, Boston
- Newark Museum
