= Young Berryman Smith =

American academic and administrator (1889–1960)

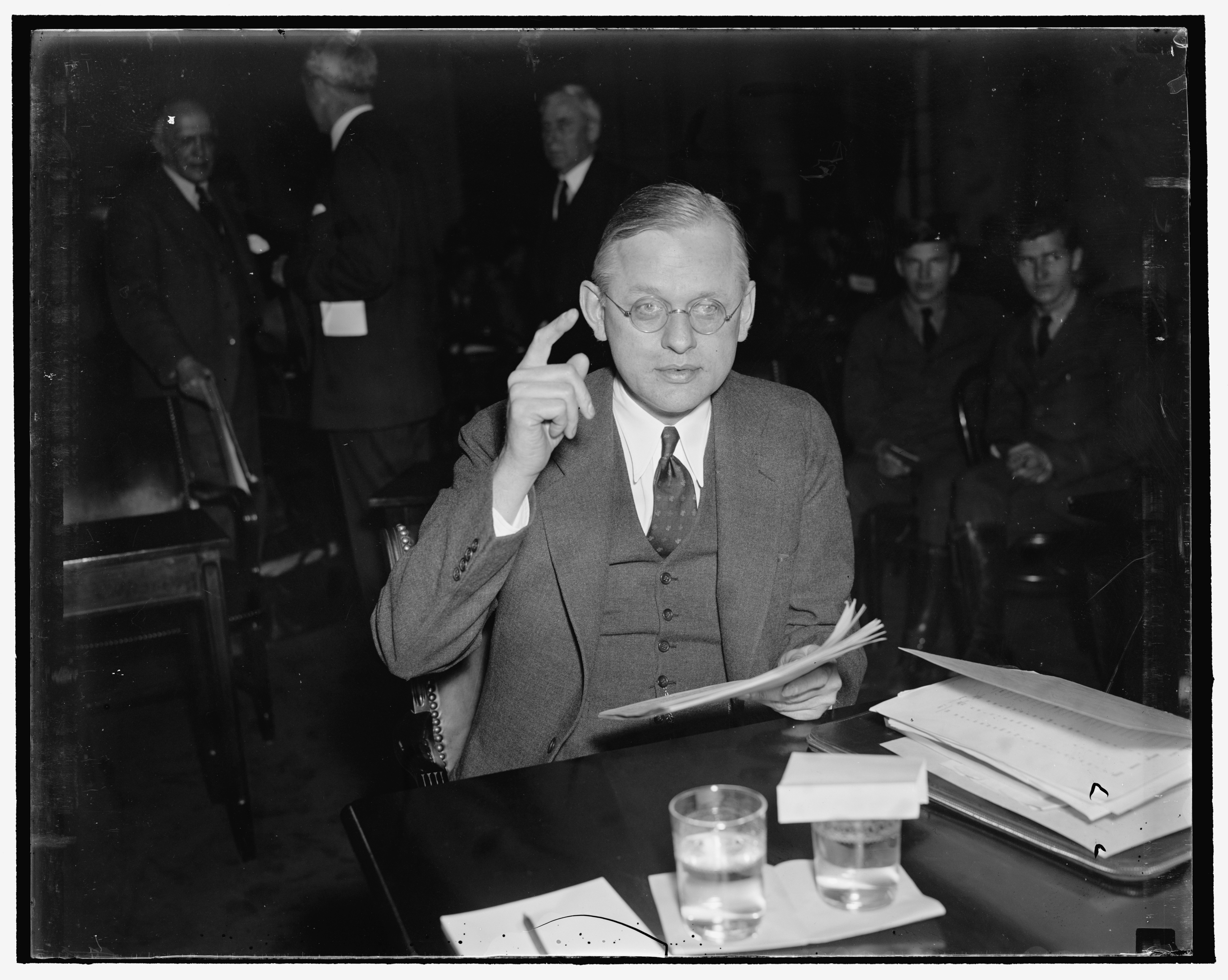
- Smith in 1937
- Born: July 27, 1889; Newnan, Georgia
- Died: June 24, 1960 (aged 70); Blowing Rock, North Carolina
- Occupation: Law professor
- Spouse: Edith Branson
- Children: 1

Academic background
- Education: University of Georgia; Columbia Law School

Academic work
- Institutions: Columbia Law School

Young Berryman Smith (July 27, 1889 – June 24, 1960) was an American legal academic and university administrator who served on the faculty of Columbia Law School from 1916 to 1958, serving as the school's dean from 1927 to 1952.

Academic offices
Preceded by Huger Jervey	Dean of Columbia Law School; 1927 - 1952	Succeeded by William Clements Warren
