= Galveston, Texas =

City in Texas, United States

- City
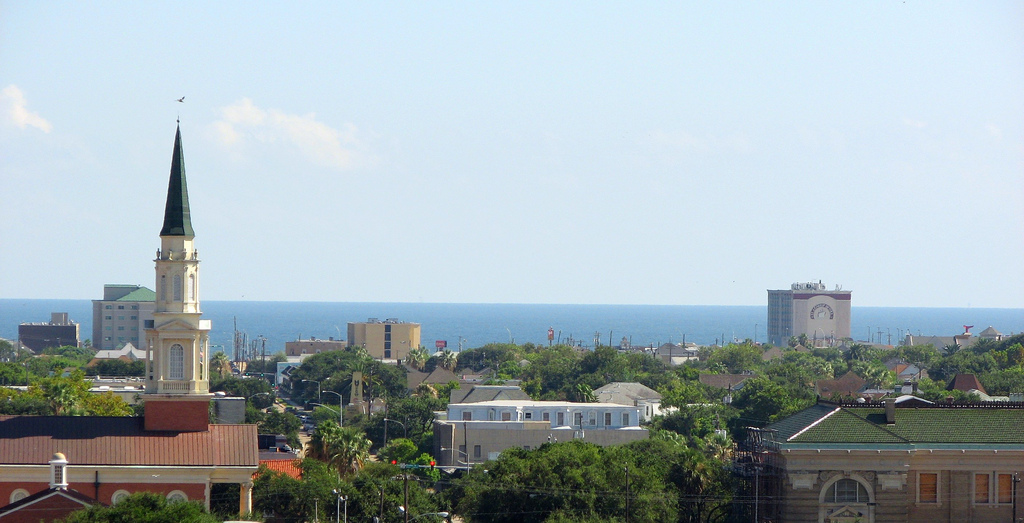
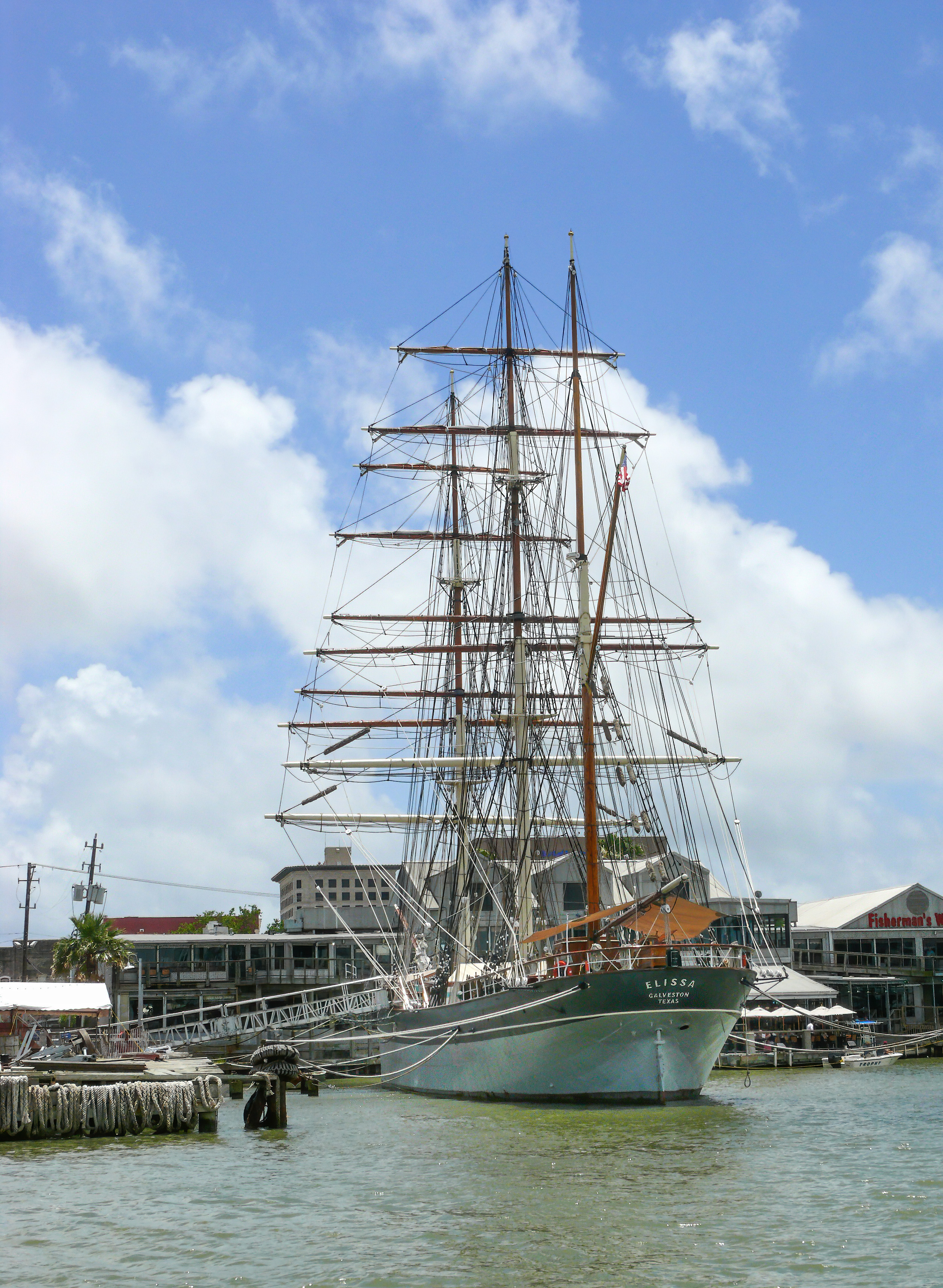
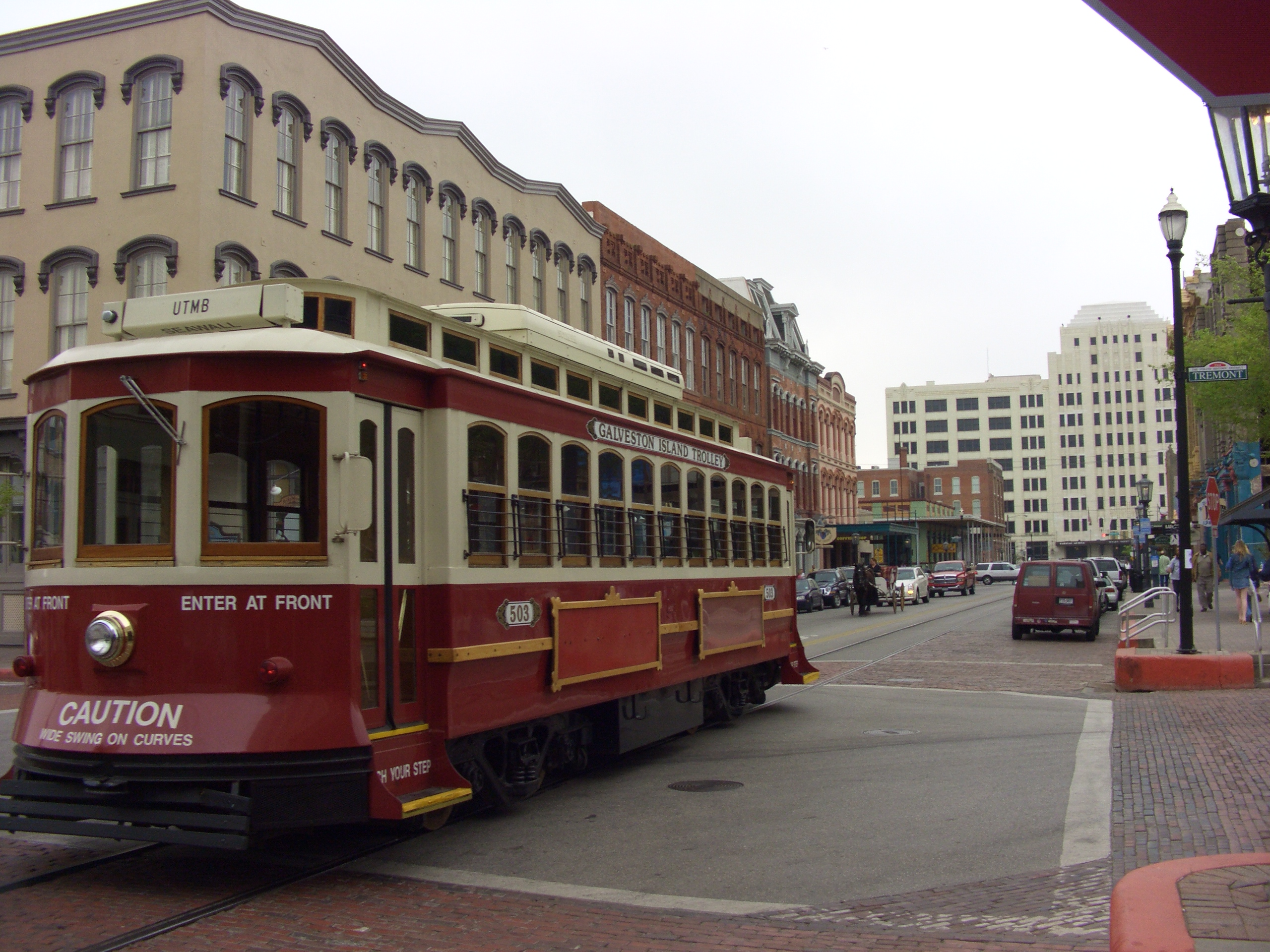
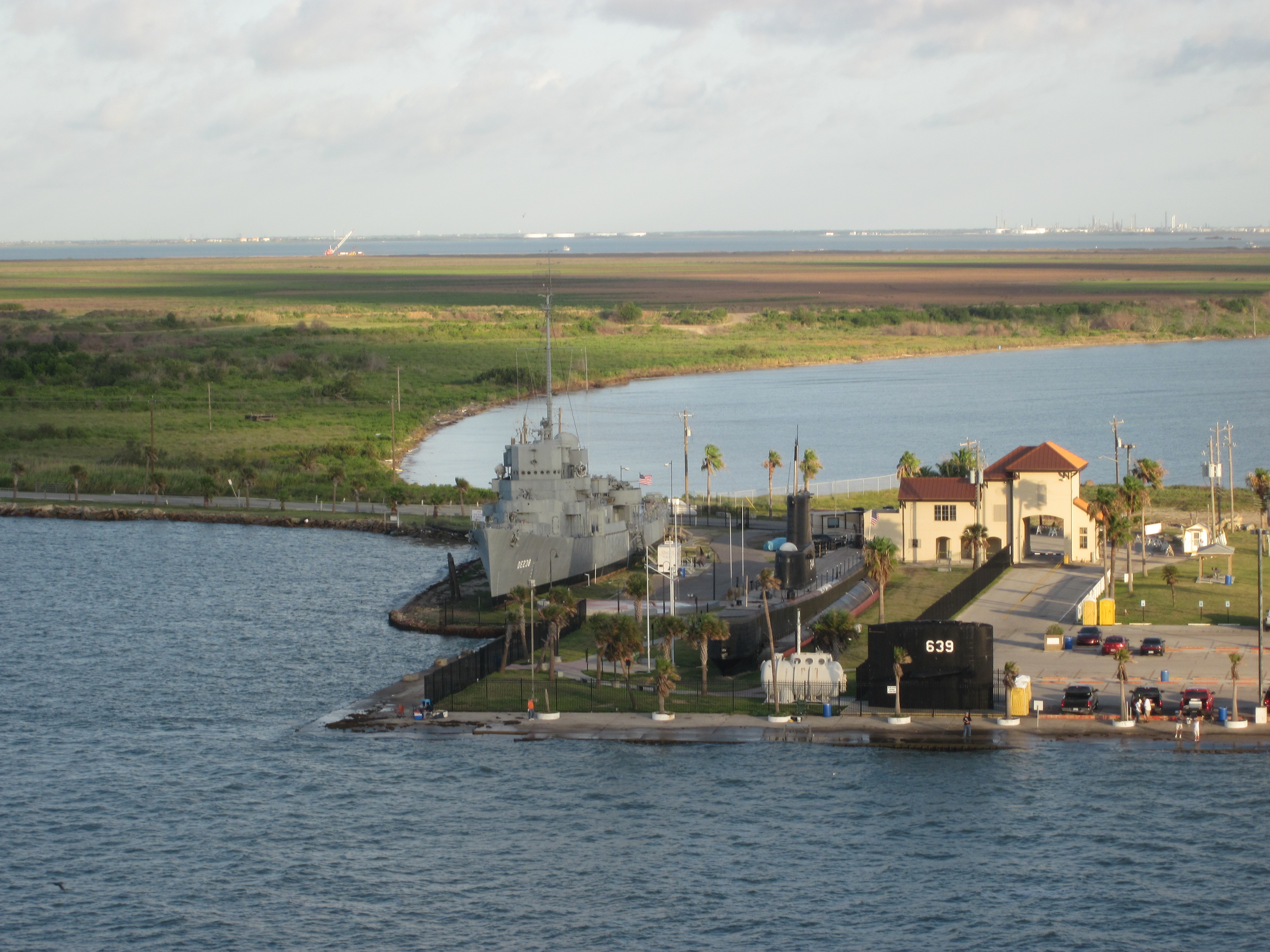
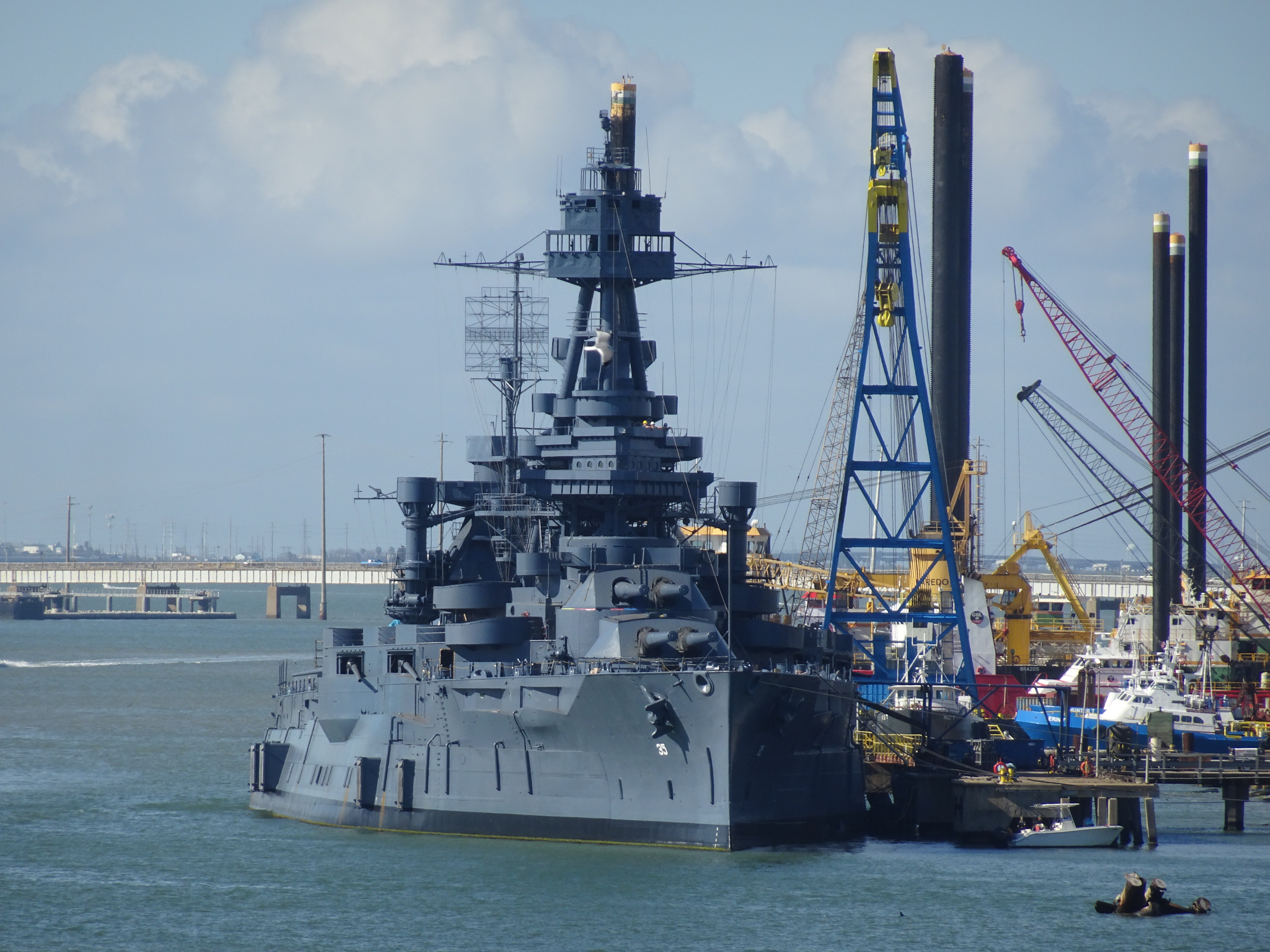
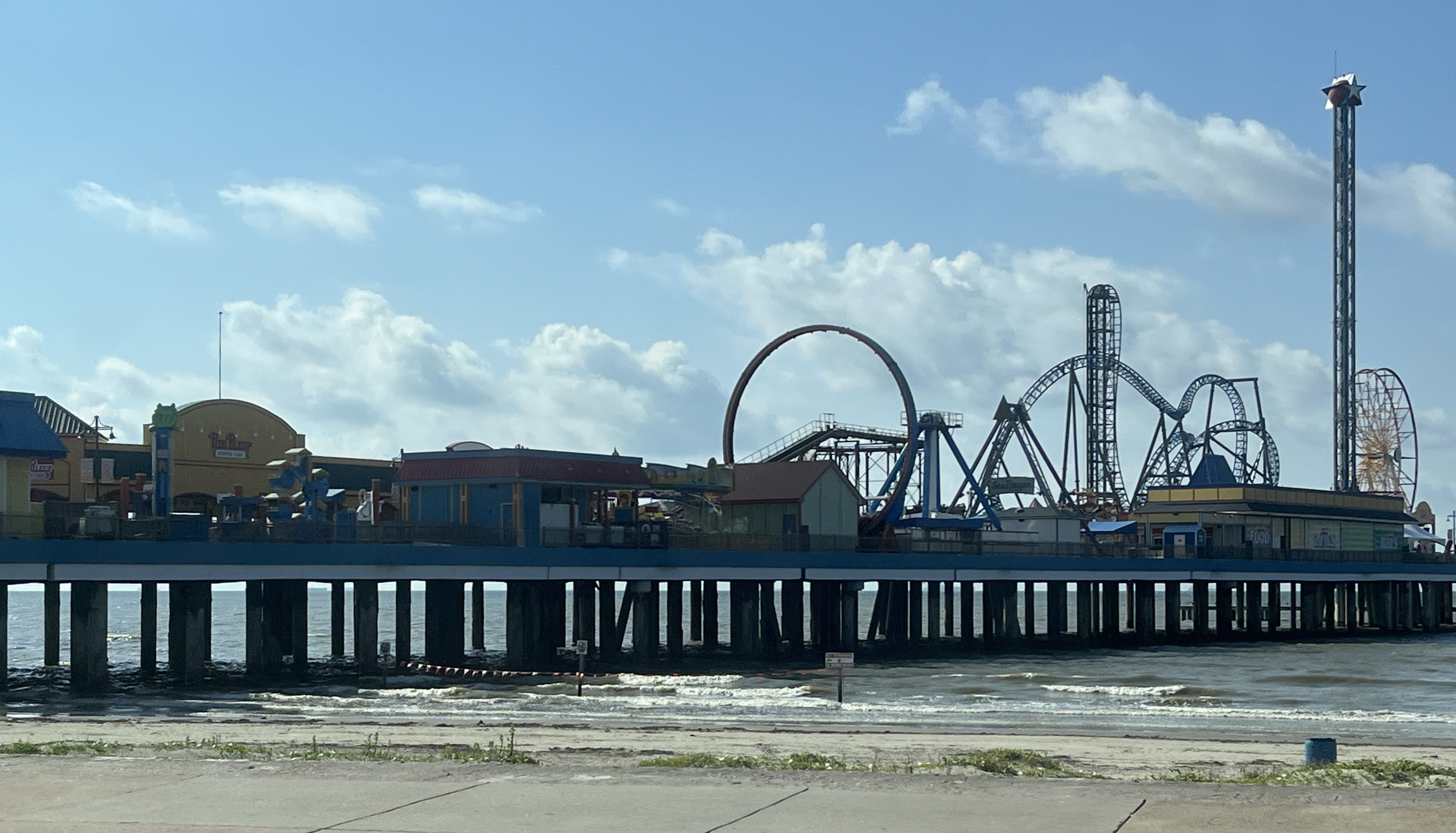
- Galveston skyline Elissa The Strand Seawolf Park USS Texas (BB-35) Galveston Island Historic Pleasure Pier

- Flag Seal
- Nickname: "The Oleander City"
- Motto: "It's Island Time"
- Interactive map of Galveston, Texas
- Location within Texas Location within the United States
- Coordinates: 29°18′5″N 94°47′42″W
- Country: United States
- State: Texas
- County: Galveston
- Incorporated: 1839
- Named for: Bernardo de Gálvez

Government
  - Type: Council–manager
  - Body: City Council
  - Mayor: John Paul Listowski
  - City Manager: Brian Maxwell

Area
  - City: 211.31 sq mi (547.29 km^{2})
  - Land: 41.03 sq mi (106.28 km^{2})
  - Water: 170.27 sq mi (441.00 km^{2})
- Elevation: 6.6 ft (2 m)

Population (2020)
  - City: 53,695
  - Estimate (2024): 53,538 ▼
  - Rank: US: 753rd TX: 70th
  - Density: 1,294/sq mi (499.5/km^{2})
  - Urban: 191,863 (US: 200th)
  - Urban density: 1,760/sq mi (679.7/km^{2})
- Demonym: Galvestonian or Galvestinian
- Time zone: UTC–6 (Central (CST))
  - Summer (DST): UTC–5 (CDT)
- ZIP Codes: 77550, 77551, 77552, 77553, 77554, 77555
- Area code: 409
- FIPS code: 48-28068
- Website: galvestontx.gov

Galveston (/ˈɡælvɪstən/ GAL-vis-tən) is a resort city and port on the Gulf Coast of the U.S. state of Texas. It encompasses 211.31 square miles (547.3 km^{2}) on Galveston Island and Pelican Island. As of the 2020 census, the city had a population of 53,695, making it the second-largest municipality in Galveston County, where it also serves as the county seat. Located at the southern end of the Greater Houston metropolitan area, Galveston sits on the northwestern coast of the Gulf of Mexico.

Galveston, or Galvez's town, was named after 18th-century Spanish military and political leader Bernardo de Gálvez, 1st Count of Gálvez (1746–1786). The first European settlements on Galveston Island were built around 1816 by French pirate Louis-Michel Aury to help the fledgling First Mexican Empire fight for independence from the Spanish Empire. The Port of Galveston was established in 1825 by the Congress of Mexico following its independence. The city was the main port for the fledgling Texas Navy during the Texas Revolution of 1836, and later served temporarily as the new national capital of the Republic of Texas. In 1865, General Gordon Granger arrived at Ashton Villa and announced to some of the last enslaved African Americans that slavery was no longer legal. This event is commemorated annually on June 19, the federal holiday of Juneteenth.

During the 19th century, Galveston became a major U.S. commercial center and one of the largest ports in the United States. It was, for a time, Texas's largest city, known as the "Queen City of the Gulf". It was devastated by the unexpected Galveston Hurricane of 1900, whose effects included massive flooding and a storm surge which nearly wiped out the town. The natural disaster on the exposed barrier island is still ranked today as the deadliest in United States history, with an estimated death toll between 6,000 and 12,000 people. The city subsequently reemerged during the Prohibition era of 1919–1933 as a leading tourist hub and a center of illegal gambling, nicknamed the Free State of Galveston until this era ended in the 1950s with subsequent economic and social development.

Much of Galveston's economy is centered in the tourism, health care, shipping, and financial industries. The 84-acre (34 ha) University of Texas Medical Branch campus with an enrollment of more than 2,500 students is a major economic force of the city. Galveston is home to six historic districts containing one of the largest historically significant collections of 19th-century buildings in the U.S., with over 60 structures listed on the National Register of Historic Places, maintained by the National Park Service in the United States Department of the Interior.

== History ==
=== Exploration and 19th-century development ===
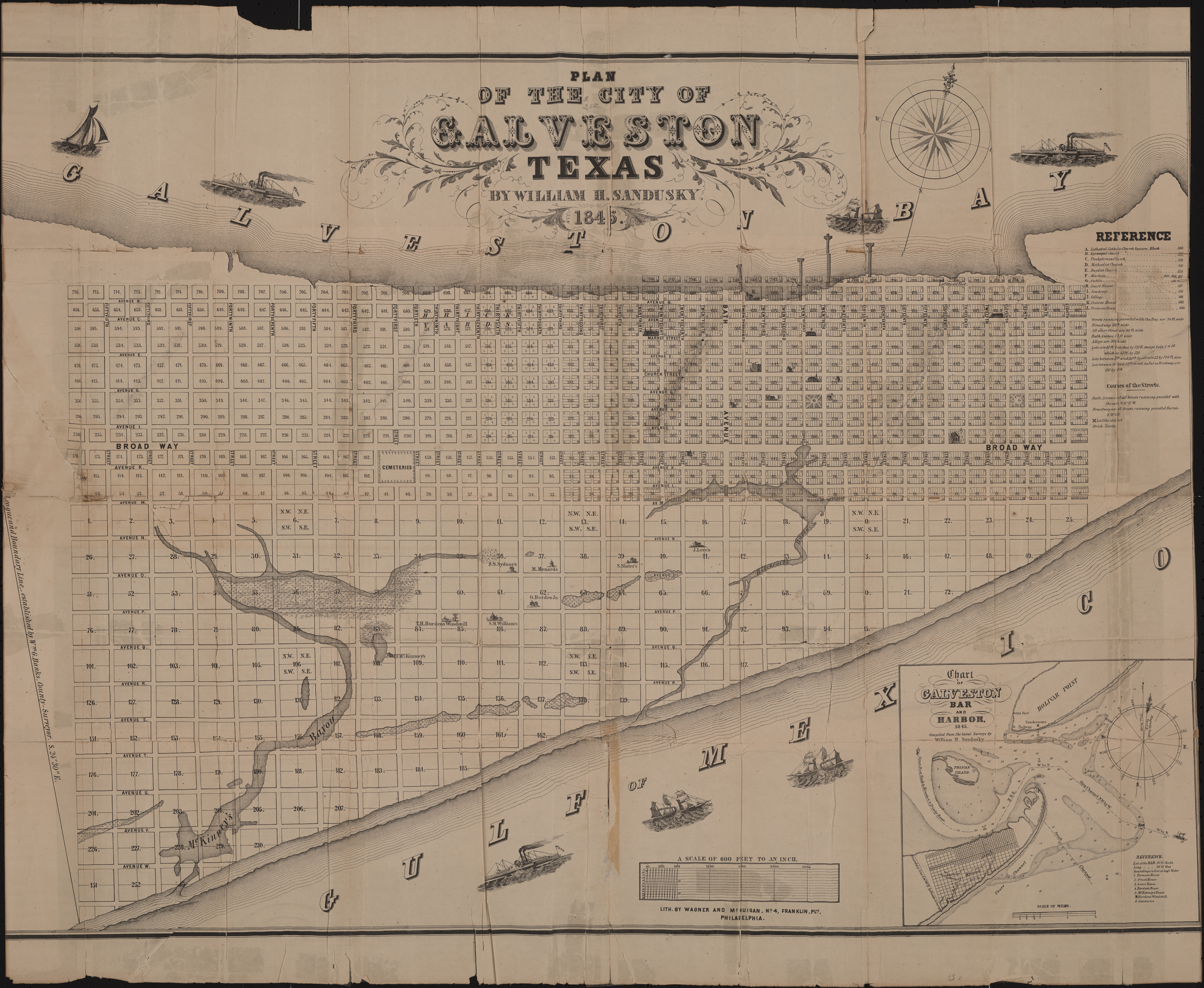
Plan of the City of Galveston (c. 1845)

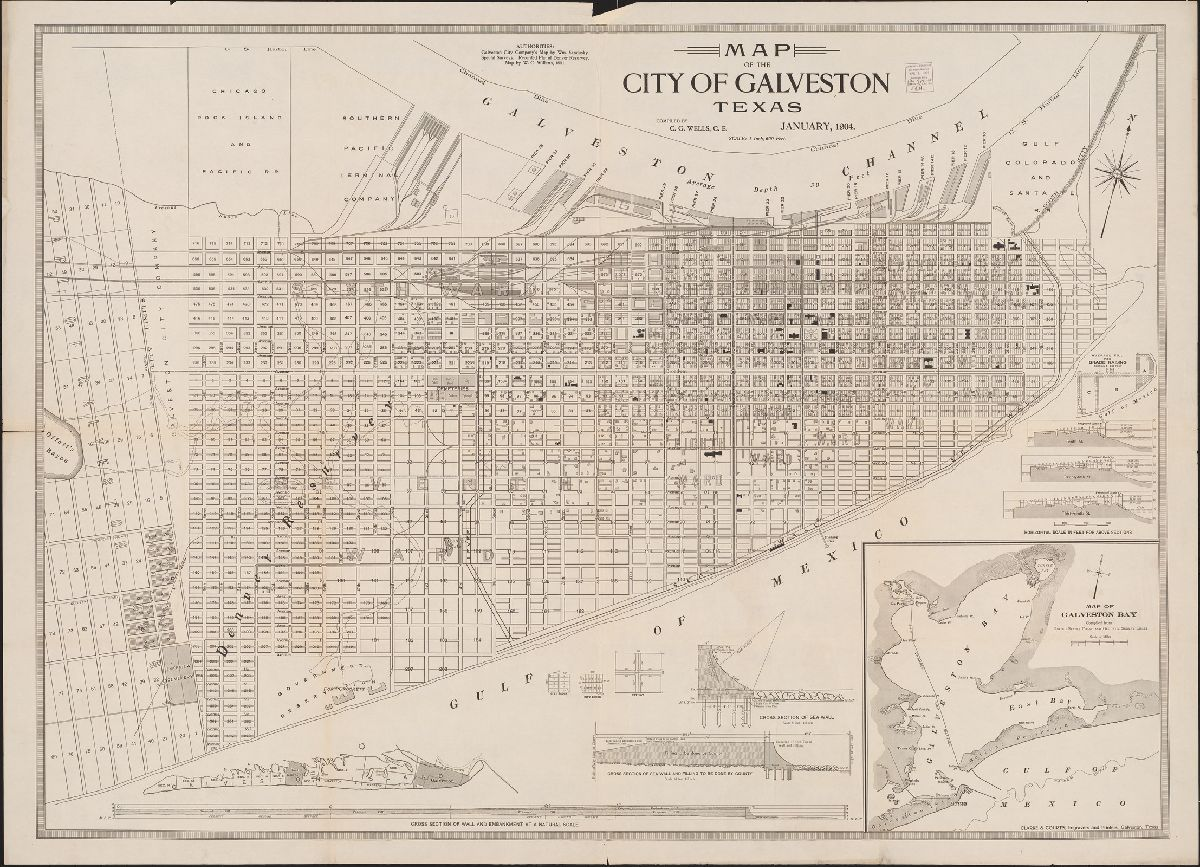
Map of City of Galveston (c. 1904)

Indigenous inhabitants of Galveston Island called the island Auia. Though there is no certainty regarding their route and their landings, Cabeza de Vaca and his crew were shipwrecked at a place he called "Isla de Malhado" in November 1528. This could have referred to Galveston Island or San Luis Island. During his charting of the Gulf Coast in 1785, the Spanish explorer José de Evia labeled the water features surrounding the island "Bd. de Galvestown" and "Bahia de Galvestowm" [sic]. He was working under the orders of Bernardo de Gálvez. In his early chart, he called the western end of the island "Isla de San Luis" and the eastern end "Pt. de Culebras". Evia did not label the island itself on his map of 1799. Just five years later, Alexander von Humboldt borrowed the place names Isla de San Luis, Pte. De Culebras, and Bahia de Galveston. Stephen F. Austin followed his predecessors in the use of "San Luis Island", but introduced "Galveston" to refer to the little village at the east end of the island. Evidence of the name Galveston Island appears on an 1833 map by David H. Burr.

The island's first permanent European settlements were constructed around 1816 by the pirate Louis-Michel Aury to support Mexico's rebellion against Spain. In 1817, Aury returned from an unsuccessful raid against Spain to find Galveston occupied by the pirate Jean Lafitte. Lafitte organized Galveston into a pirate "kingdom" he called "Campeche", anointing himself the island's "head of government". Lafitte remained in Galveston until 1821, when the United States Navy forced him and his raiders off the island.

In 1825 the Congress of Mexico established the Port of Galveston and in 1830 erected a customs house. Galveston served as the capital of the Republic of Texas when in 1836 the interim president David G. Burnet relocated his government there. In 1836, the French-Canadian Michel Branamour Menard and several associates purchased 4,605 acres (18.64 km^{2}) of land for $50,000 to found the town that would become the modern city of Galveston. As Anglo-Americans migrated to the city, they brought along or purchased enslaved African Americans, some of whom worked domestically or on the waterfront, including on riverboats.

In 1839, the City of Galveston adopted a charter and was incorporated by the Congress of the Republic of Texas. The city was by then a burgeoning port of entry and attracted many new residents in the 1840s and later among the flood of German immigrants to Texas, including Jewish merchants. Together with ethnic Mexican residents, these groups tended to oppose slavery, support the Union during the Civil War, and join the Republican Party after the war.

During this expansion, the city had many "firsts" in the state, with the founding of institutions and adoption of inventions: post office (1836), naval base (1836), Texas chapter of a Masonic order (1840); cotton compress (1842), Catholic parochial school (Ursuline Academy) (1847), insurance company (1854), and gas lights (1856).

The 1860 U.S. Census lists 7,300 inhabitants in the town, including nearly 1,200 enslaved. During the American Civil War, Confederate forces under Major General John B. Magruder attacked and expelled occupying Union troops from the city in January 1863 in the Battle of Galveston. On June 19, 1865, two months after the end of the war and almost three years after the issuance of the Emancipation Proclamation, General Gordon Granger of the Union Army informed the enslaved people of Texas that they were now free. This news was transmitted via General Order No. 3, an event now commemorated on the federal holiday of Juneteenth.

After the Civil War, Galveston mandated street improvements and construction standards. The city required property owners facing commercial streets to construct and maintain sidewalks of wooden planks or bricks, or pay an assessment to the city for the construction of the same. During the same period, the city drew a boundary known as a "fire zone", within which new buildings could not be constructed of wood.

In 1867 Galveston suffered a yellow fever epidemic; about 1800 people died in the city. These occurred in waterfront and river cities throughout the 19th century, as did cholera epidemics.

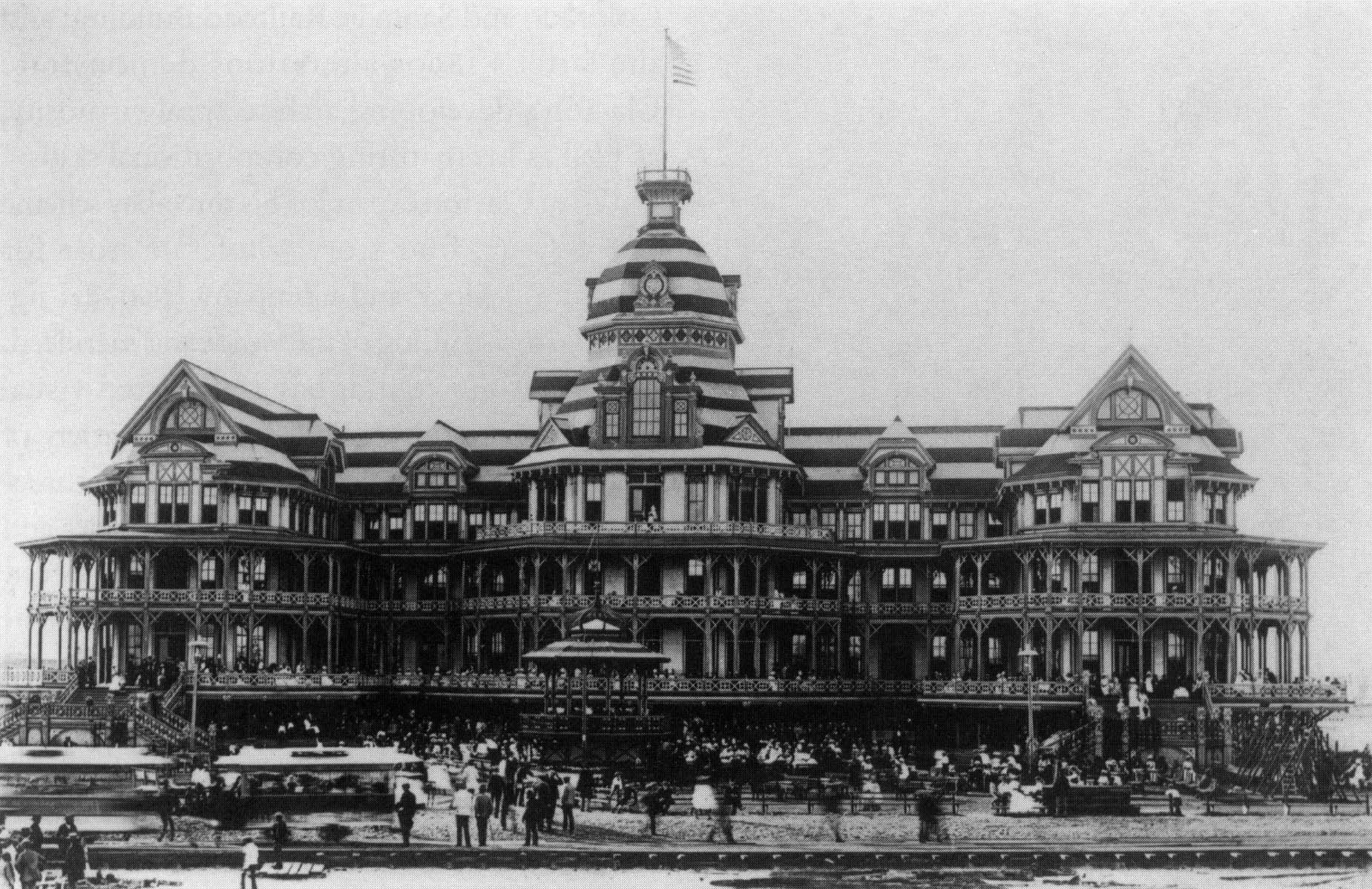
The Beach Hotel catered to vacationers until a fire in 1898.

The city's progress continued through the Reconstruction era with numerous "firsts": construction of the opera house (1870), and orphanage (1876), installation of telephone lines (1878) and electric lights (1883). Having attracted freedmen from rural areas, in 1870 the city had a black population that totaled 3,000, made up mostly of former slaves but also by persons who were free men of color and educated before the war. Blacks comprised nearly 25% of the city's population of 13,818 that year.

During the post–Civil War period, leaders such as George T. Ruby and Norris Wright Cuney, who headed the Texas Republican Party and promoted civil rights for freedmen, helped to dramatically improve educational and employment opportunities for blacks in Galveston and in Texas. Cuney established his own business of stevedores and a union of black dockworkers to break the white monopoly on dock jobs. Galveston was a cosmopolitan city and one of the more successful during Reconstruction; the Freedmen's Bureau was headquartered here. German families sheltered teachers from the North, and hundreds of freedmen were taught to read. Its business community promoted progress, and immigrants stayed after arriving at this port of entry.

By the end of the 19th century, the city of Galveston had a population of 37,000. Its position on the natural harbor of Galveston Bay along the Gulf of Mexico made it the center of trade in Texas. It was one of the nation's largest cotton ports, in competition with New Orleans. Throughout the 19th century, the port city of Galveston grew rapidly and the Strand was considered the region's primary business center. For a time, the Strand was known as the "Wall Street of the South". In the late 1890s, the government constructed Fort Crockett defenses and coastal artillery batteries in Galveston and along the Bolivar Roads. In February 1897, the USS Texas (nicknamed Old Hoodoo), the first commissioned battleship of the United States Navy, visited Galveston. During the festivities, the ship's officers were presented with a $5,000 silver service, adorned with various Texas motifs, as a gift from the state's citizens.

=== Hurricane of 1900 and recovery ===
On September 8, 1900, the island was struck by a devastating hurricane. This event holds the record as the United States' deadliest natural disaster. The city was devastated, and an estimated 6,000 to 8,000 people on the island were killed. Following the storm, a 10-mile (16 km) long, 17 foot (5.2 m) high seawall was built to protect the city from floods and hurricane storm surges. A team of engineers including Henry Martyn Robert (Robert's Rules of Order) designed the plan to raise much of the existing city to a sufficient elevation behind a seawall so that confidence in the city could be maintained.

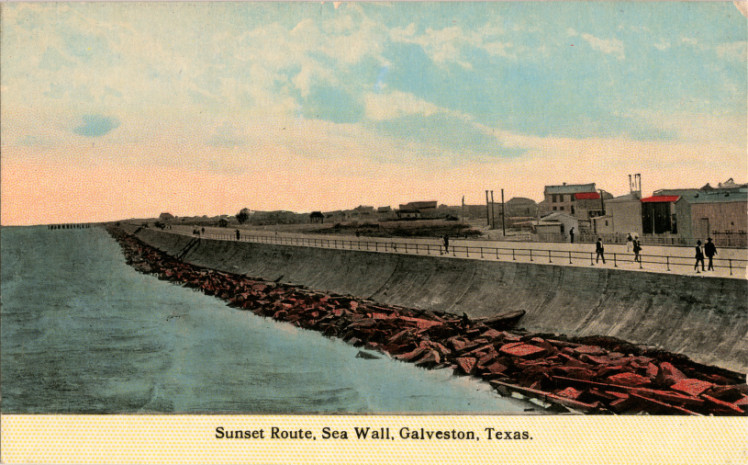
Sunset Route, Seawall, Galveston, Texas (postcard, c. 1907)

The city developed the city commission form of city government, known as the "Galveston Plan", to help expedite recovery.

Despite attempts to draw investment to the city after the hurricane, Galveston never returned to its levels of national importance or prosperity. Development was also hindered by the construction of the Houston Ship Channel, which brought the Port of Houston into competition with the natural harbor of the Port of Galveston for sea traffic. Finally, the Seawall itself created an insurmountable problem: passive erosion resulting in the gradual disappearance of the once-wide beach and the resort business with it. "Within twenty years, the city had lost one hundred yards of sand. People who once watched auto racing on a wide beach were left with a narrow strip of sand at low tide and a gloomy vista of waves on rocks when the tide was high."

To further its recovery and rebuild its population, Galveston actively solicited immigration. Through the efforts of Rabbi Henry Cohen and Congregation B'nai Israel, Galveston became the focus of an immigration plan called the Galveston Movement that, between 1907 and 1914, diverted roughly 10,000 Eastern European Jewish immigrants from the usual destinations of the crowded cities of the Northeastern United States. Additionally numerous other immigrant groups, including Greeks, Italians and Russian Jews, came to the city during this period. This immigration trend substantially altered the ethnic makeup of the island, as well as many other areas of Texas and the western U.S. Unfortunately, just as the island was starting to recover from the devastation caused by the first flood, a second one struck in August 1915, thanks to a major hurricane that originated in the central Atlantic, tore through the Caribbean, and then left a long trail of destruction across the Gulf of Mexico before it dissipated in the Gulf of St. Lawrence, nearly three weeks later. While the newly constructed seawall spared the island the worst, over 400 Galvestonians died, and damages totaled $30 million USD, equivalent to $903 million in 2023. Thus, in less than a single generation Galveston went from being Texas's most populous (and most important) city to being a tragic footnote to a century of frontier violence, urban lawlessness and civic greed, throughout the state.

Though the storms stalled economic development and the city of Houston developed as the region's principal metropolis, Galveston economic leaders recognized the need to diversify from the traditional port-related industries. In 1905 William Lewis Moody, Jr. and Isaac H. Kempner, members of two of Galveston's leading families, founded the American National Insurance Company. Two years later, Moody established the City National Bank, which would become the Moody National Bank.

During the 1920s and 1930s, the city re-emerged as a major tourist destination. Under the influence of Sam Maceo and Rosario Maceo, the city exploited the prohibition of liquor and gambling in clubs like the Balinese Room, which offered entertainment to wealthy Houstonians and other out-of-towners. Combined with prostitution, which had existed in the city since well before the American Civil War, Galveston became known as the "sin city" of the Gulf. Galvestonians accepted and supported the illegal activities, often referring to their island as the "Free State of Galveston". The island had entered what would later become known as the "open era".

The 1930s and 1940s brought much change to the Island City. During World War II, the Galveston Municipal Airport, predecessor to Scholes International Airport, was re-designated a U.S. Army Air Corps base and named "Galveston Army Air Field". In January 1943, Galveston Army Air Field was officially activated with the 46th Bombardment Group serving an anti-submarine role in the Gulf of Mexico. In 1942, William Lewis Moody, Jr., along with his wife Libbie Shearn Rice Moody, established the Moody Foundation to benefit "present and future generations of Texans". The foundation, one of the largest in the United States, would play a prominent role in Galveston during later decades, helping to fund numerous civic and health-oriented programs.

=== After World War II ===
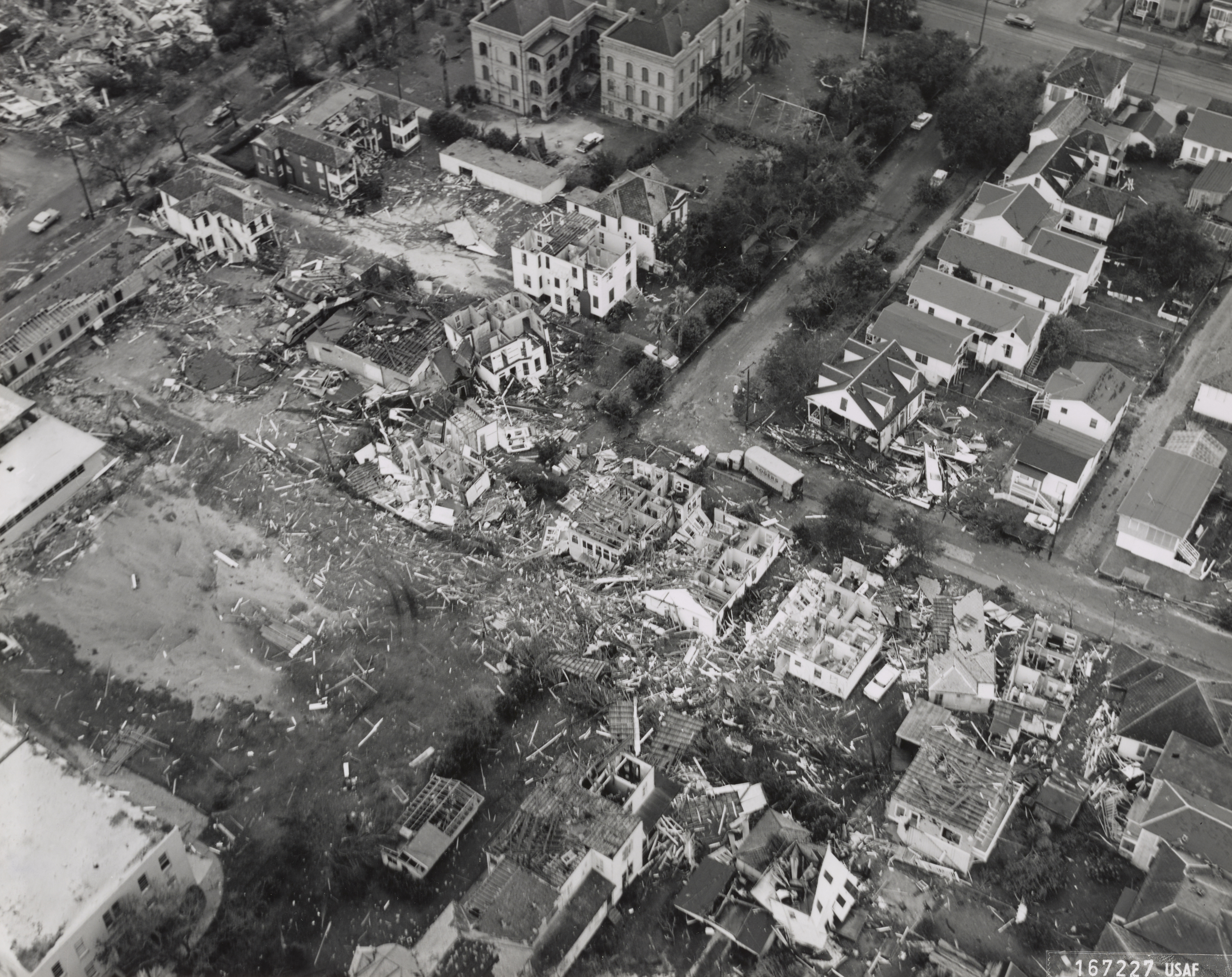
Damage after Hurricane Carla, 1961

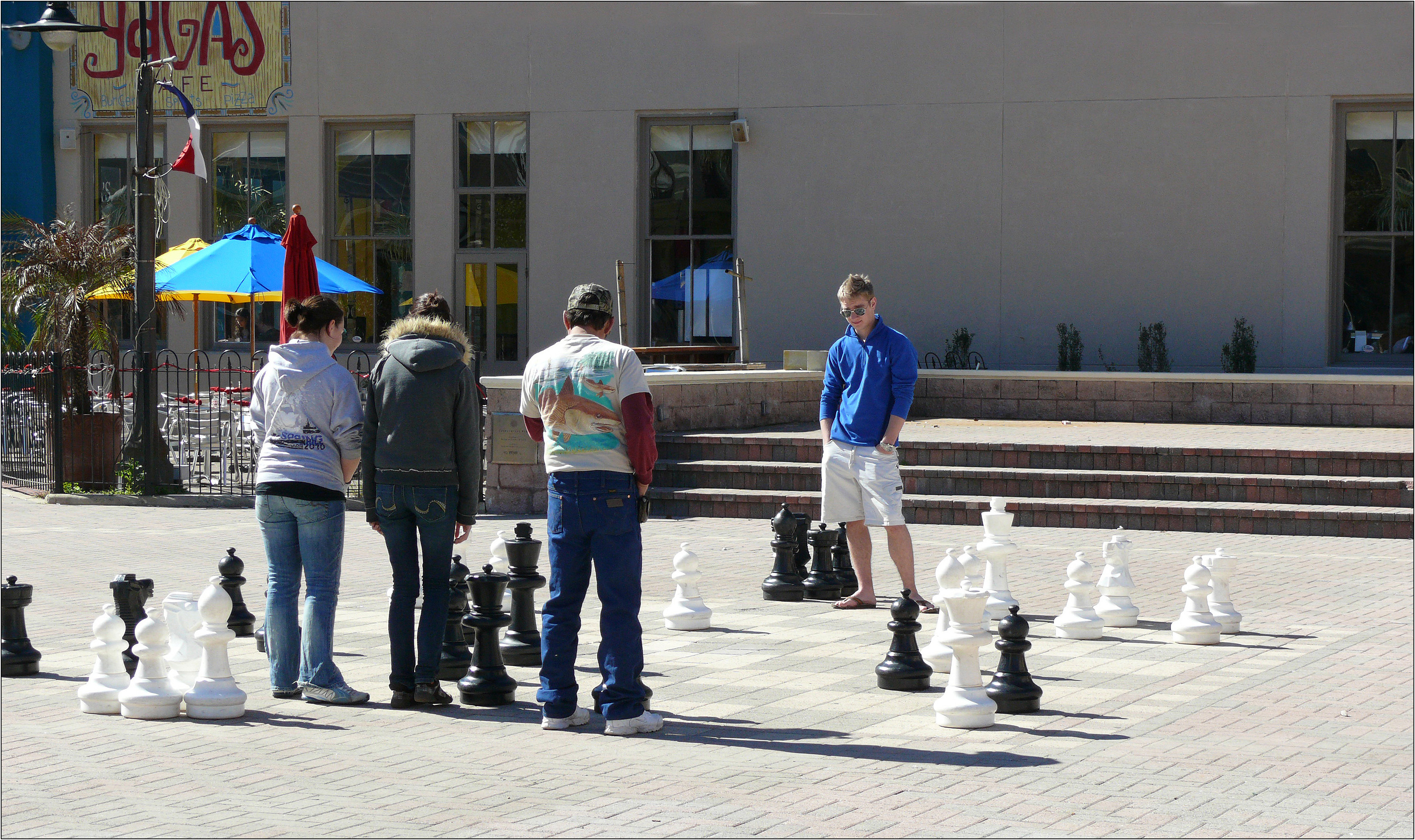
Playing chess on the Strand

The end of the war drastically reduced military investment in the island. Increasing enforcement of gambling laws and the growth of Las Vegas, Nevada, as a competitive center of gambling and entertainment put pressure on the gaming industry on the island. Finally in 1957, Texas Attorney General Will Wilson and the Texas Rangers began a massive campaign of raids that disrupted gambling and prostitution in the city. As these vice industries crashed, so did tourism, taking the rest of the Galveston economy with it. Neither the economy nor the culture of the city was the same afterward.

In 1947, buildings in the city were damaged when a ship carrying 2,200 tons of ammonium nitrate exploded at the nearby Port of Texas City, in what became known as the Texas City disaster.

The island's economy began a long stagnation. Many businesses relocated off the island during this period, but health care, insurance, and financial industries continue to be strong contributors to the economy. By 1959, the city of Houston had long outpaced Galveston in population and economic growth. Beginning in 1957, the Galveston Historical Foundation began its efforts to preserve historic buildings. The 1966 book The Galveston That Was helped encourage the preservation movement. Restoration efforts financed by motivated investors, notably Houston businessman George P. Mitchell, gradually developed the Strand Historic District and reinvented other areas. A new, family-oriented tourism emerged in the city over many years.

In September 1961, Hurricane Carla struck the city, generating an F4 tornado that killed eight and injured 200.

With the 1960s came the expansion of higher education in Galveston. Already home to the University of Texas Medical Branch, the city got a boost in 1962 with the creation of the Texas Maritime Academy, predecessor of Texas A&M University at Galveston; and by 1967, a community college, Galveston College, had been established.

In the 2000s, property values rose after expensive projects were completed, and demand for second homes by the wealthy increased. It has made it difficult for middle-class workers to find affordable housing on the island.

Hurricane Ike made landfall on Galveston Island in the early morning of September 13, 2008, as a category-2 hurricane with winds of 110 miles per hour. Damage was extensive to buildings along the seawall.

After the storm, the island was rebuilt with investments in tourism and shipping, and continued emphasis on higher education and health care, notably the addition of the Galveston Island Historic Pleasure Pier and the replacement of the bascule-type drawbridge on the railroad causeway with a vertical-lift-type drawbridge to allow heavier freight.

== Geography ==
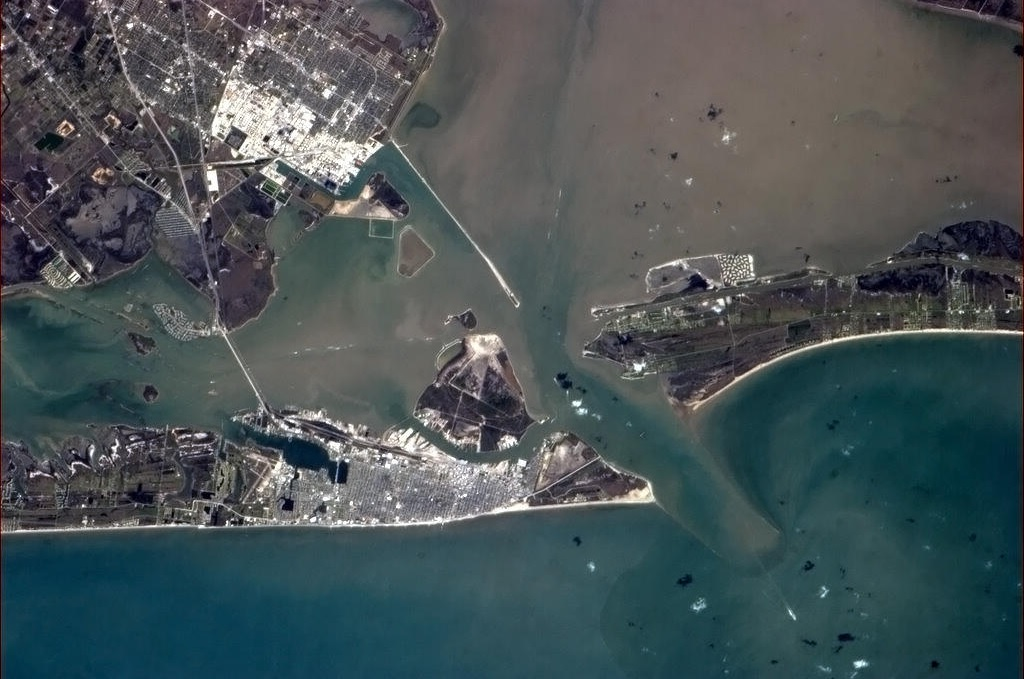
Galveston, from the International Space Station

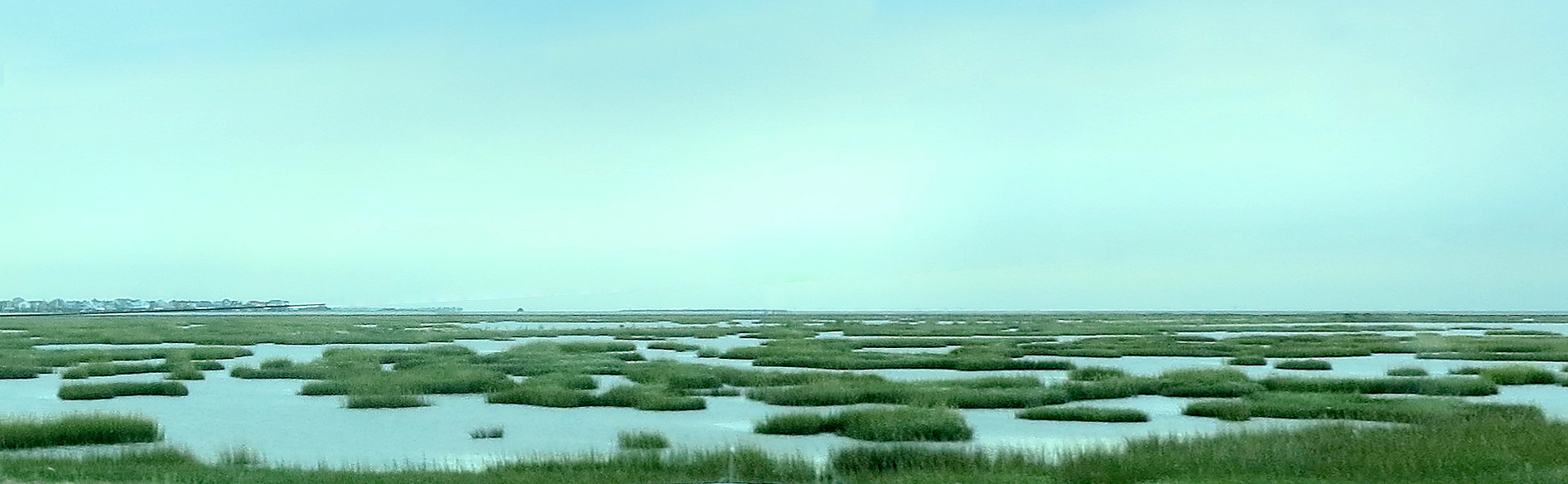
Salt marsh near Galveston

The city of Galveston is situated on Galveston Island, a barrier island off the Texas Gulf Coast near the mainland coast. Made up of mostly sand-sized particles and smaller amounts of finer mud sediments and larger gravel-sized sediments, the island is unstable, affected by water and weather, and can shift its boundaries through erosion.

The city is about 45 miles (72 km) southeast of downtown Houston. The island is oriented generally northeast-southwest, with the Gulf of Mexico on the east and south, West Bay on the west, and Galveston Bay on the north. The island's main access point from the mainland is the Interstate Highway 45 causeway that crosses West Bay on the island's northeast side.

A deepwater channel connects Galveston's harbor with the Gulf and the Gulf Intracoastal Waterway. According to the United States Census Bureau, the city has an area of 211.31 square miles (547.29 km^{2}), of which 41.04 square miles (106.29 km^{2}) are land and 170.27 square miles (441.00 km^{2}), or 80.31%, are water. The island is 50 miles (80 km) southeast of Houston.

The western portion of Galveston is referred to as the "West End", roughly corresponding to the area west of the western end of the seawall. Communities in eastern Galveston (the area east of the western end of the seawall) include Havre Lafitte, Offats Bayou, Central City, Fort Crockett, Bayou Shore, Lasker Park, Carver Park, Kempner Park, Old City/Central Business District, San Jacinto, East End, and Lindale. As of 2009 many residents of the west end use golf carts as transportation to take them to and from residential houses, the Galveston Island Country Club, and stores. In 2009, Chief of Police Charles Wiley said he believed golf carts should be prohibited outside golf courses, and West End residents campaigned against any ban on their use.

In 2011, Rice University released a study, "Atlas of Sustainable Strategies for Galveston Island", which argued the West End of Galveston was quickly eroding and the city should reduce construction and/or population in that area. It recommended against any rebuilding of the West End in the event of damage from another hurricane.

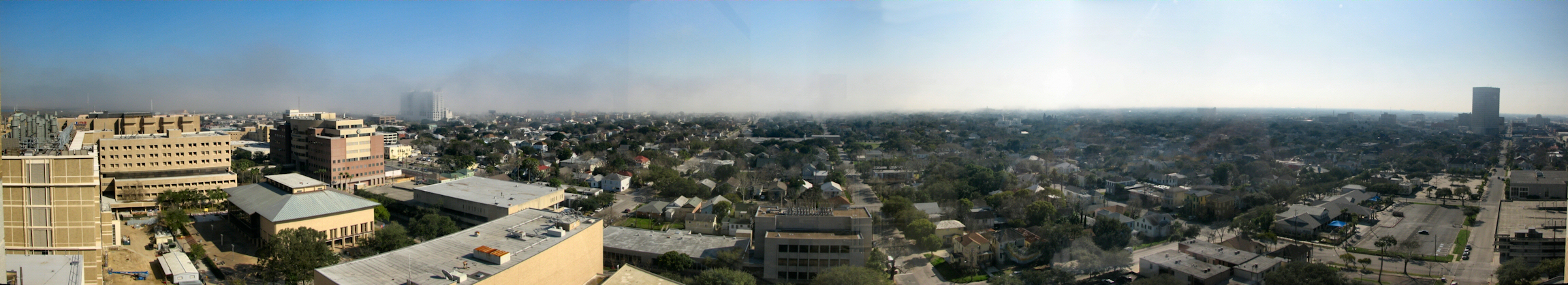
The city of Galveston looking east toward the Gulf of Mexico. Downtown Galveston and the Strand Historic District are behind while East Beach and the University of Texas Medical Branch Children's Hospital and Shriners Children's Burns Hospital are to straight ahead.

=== Historic districts ===
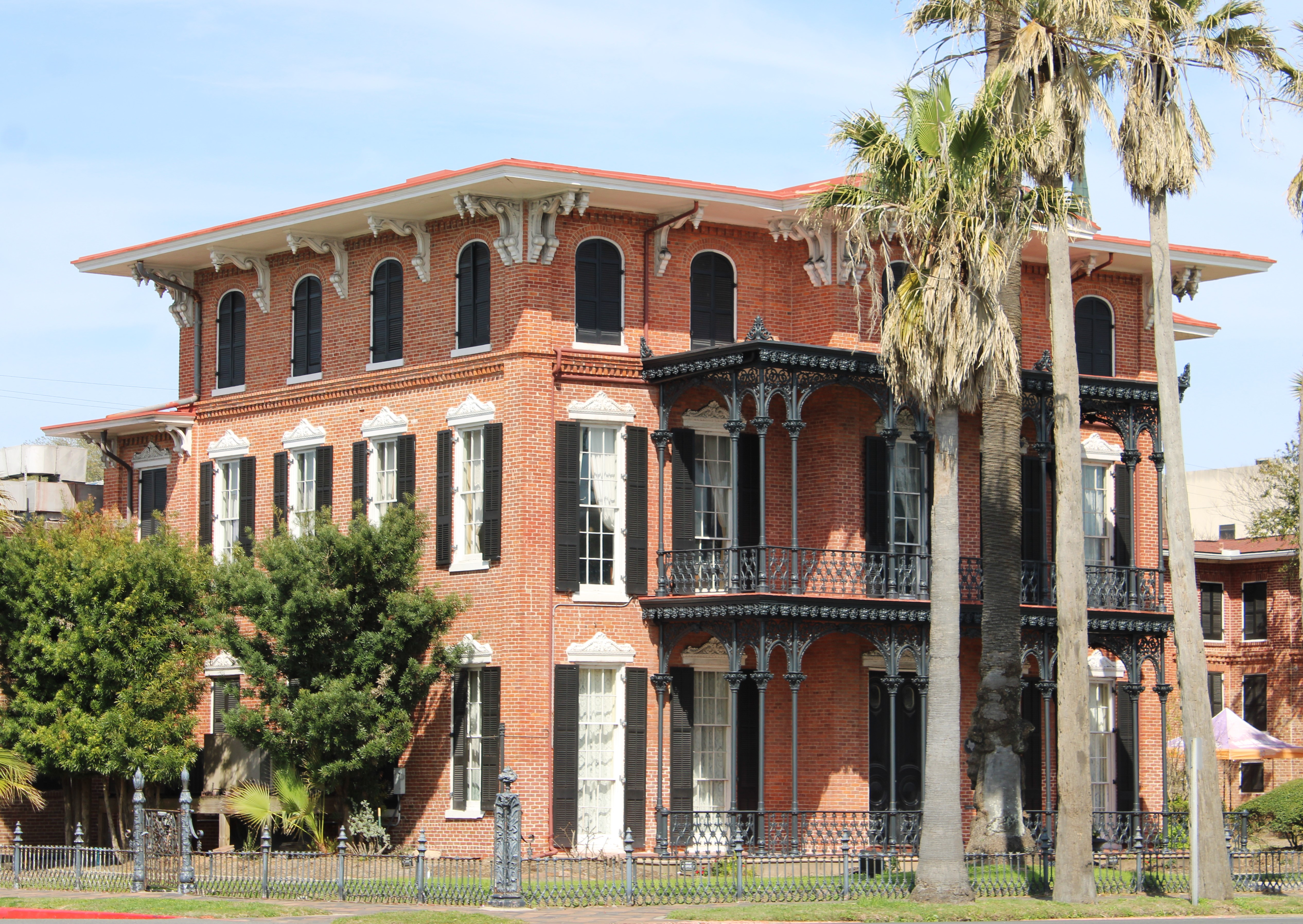
Galveston has many restored Victorian homes, including Ashton Villa

Galveston is home to six historic districts with over 60 structures listed representing architectural significance in the National Register of Historic Places. The Silk Stocking National Historic District, between Broadway and Seawall Boulevard and bounded by Ave. K, 23rd St., Ave. P, and 26th St., contains a collection of historic homes constructed from the Civil War through World War II. The East End Historic District on both sides of Broadway and Market Streets, contains 463 buildings. Other historic districts include Cedar Lawn, Denver Court and Fort Travis.

The Strand National Historic Landmark District is a national historic landmark district of mainly Victorian era buildings that have been adapted for use as restaurants, antique stores, historical exhibits, museums, and art galleries. The area is a major tourist attraction for the island city. It is the center for two very popular seasonal festivals. It is widely considered the island's shopping and entertainment center. Today, "the Strand" is generally used to refer to the five-block business district between 20th and 25th streets in downtown Galveston, near the city's wharf.

=== Architecture ===
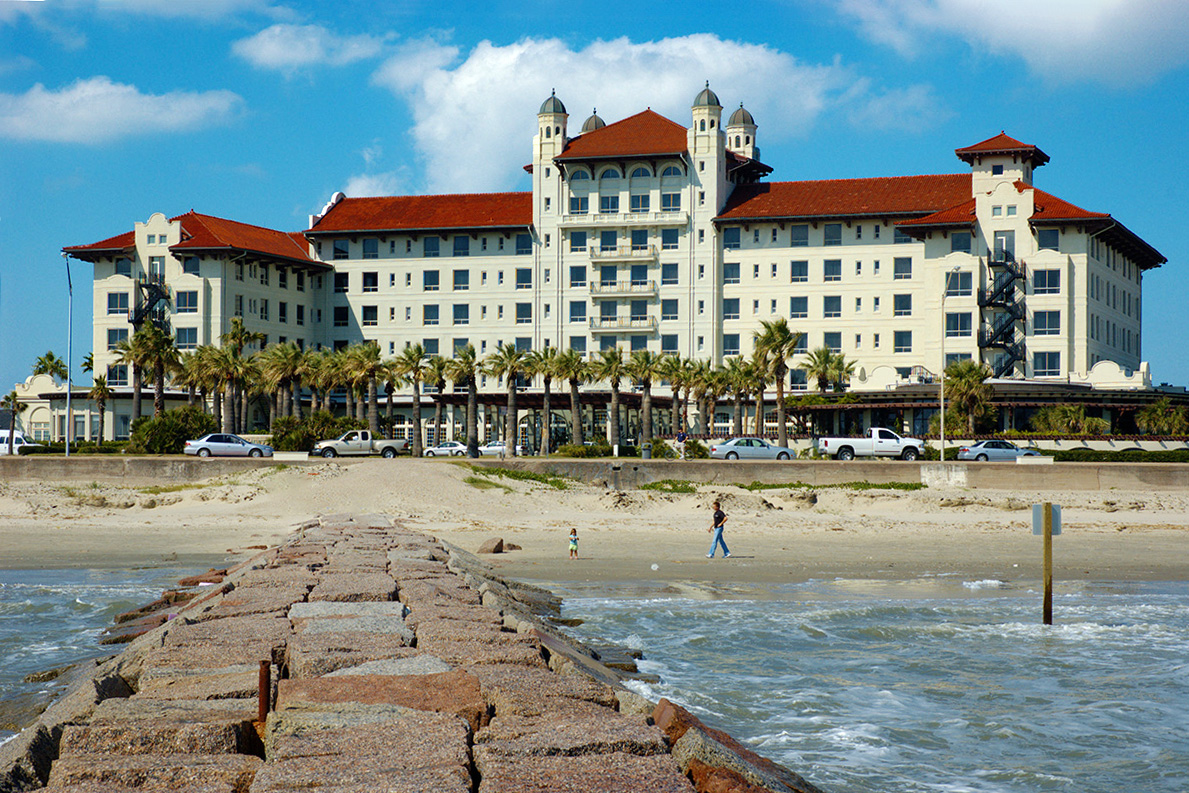
Galvez Hotel

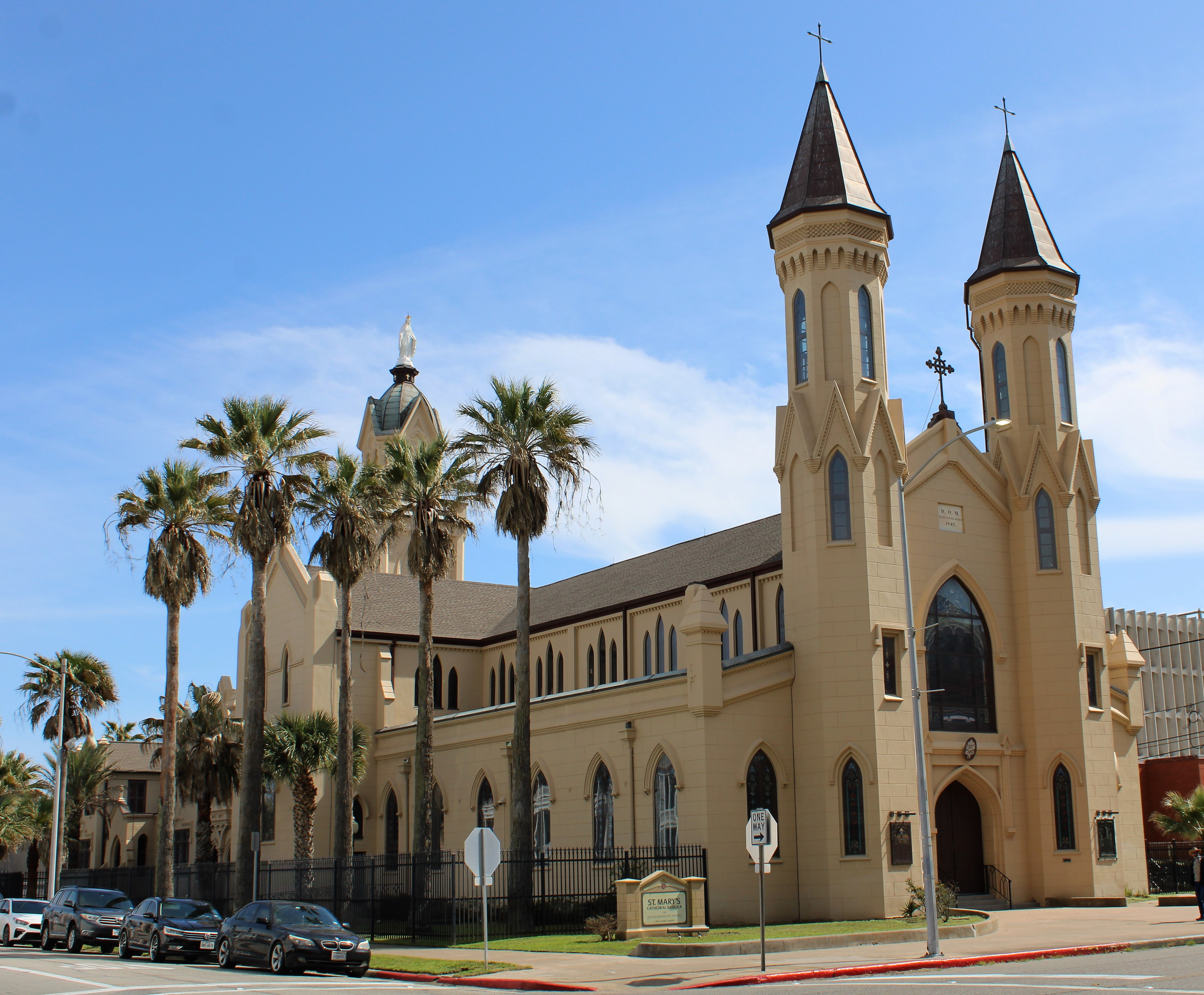
St. Mary Cathedral Basilica

Galveston contains a large and historically significant collection of 19th-century buildings in the United States. Galveston's architectural preservation and revitalization efforts over several decades have earned national recognition.

Located in the Strand District, the Grand 1894 Opera House is a restored historic Romanesque Revival style Opera House that is currently operated as a not-for-profit performing arts theater. The Bishop's Palace, also known as Gresham's Castle, is an ornate Victorian house located on Broadway and 14th Street in the East End Historic District of Galveston, Texas. The American Institute of Architects listed Bishop's Palace as one of the 100 most significant buildings in the United States, and the Library of Congress has classified it as one of the fourteen most representative Victorian structures in the nation.

The Galvez Hotel is a historic hotel that opened in 1911. The building was named the Galvez, honoring Bernardo de Gálvez y Madrid, Count of Gálvez, for whom the city was named. The hotel was added to the National Register of Historic Places on April 4, 1979. The Michel B. Menard House, built in 1838 and the oldest surviving structure in Galveston, is designed in the Greek revival style. In 1880, the house was bought by Edwin N. Ketchum who was police chief of the city during the 1900 Storm. The Ketchum family owned the home until the 1970s. Ashton Villa, a red-brick Victorian Italianate home, was constructed in 1859 by James Moreau Brown. One of the first brick structures in Texas, it is listed on the National Register of Historic Places and is a recorded Texas Historic Landmark. The structure is also the site of what was to become the holiday known as Juneteenth, where on June 19, 1865, Union General Gordon Granger, standing on its balcony, read the contents of "General Order No. 3", thereby emancipating all slaves in the state of Texas.

St. Joseph's Church was built by German immigrants in 1859–1860 and is the oldest wooden church building in Galveston and the oldest German Catholic Church in Texas. The church was dedicated in April 1860, to St. Joseph, the patron saint of laborers. The building is a wooden gothic revival structure, rectangular with a square bell tower with trefoil window. The U.S. Custom House began construction in 1860 and was completed in 1861. The Confederate Army occupied the building during the American Civil War, In 1865, the Custom House was the site of the ceremony officially ending the Civil War.

Galveston's modern architecture include the American National Insurance Company Tower (One Moody Plaza), San Luis Resort South and North Towers, The Breakers Condominiums, The Galvestonian Resort and Condos, One Shearn Moody Plaza, US National Bank Building, the Rainforest Pyramid at Moody Gardens, John Sealy Hospital Towers at UTMB and Medical Arts Building (also known as Two Moody Plaza).

=== Oleander shrubs ===
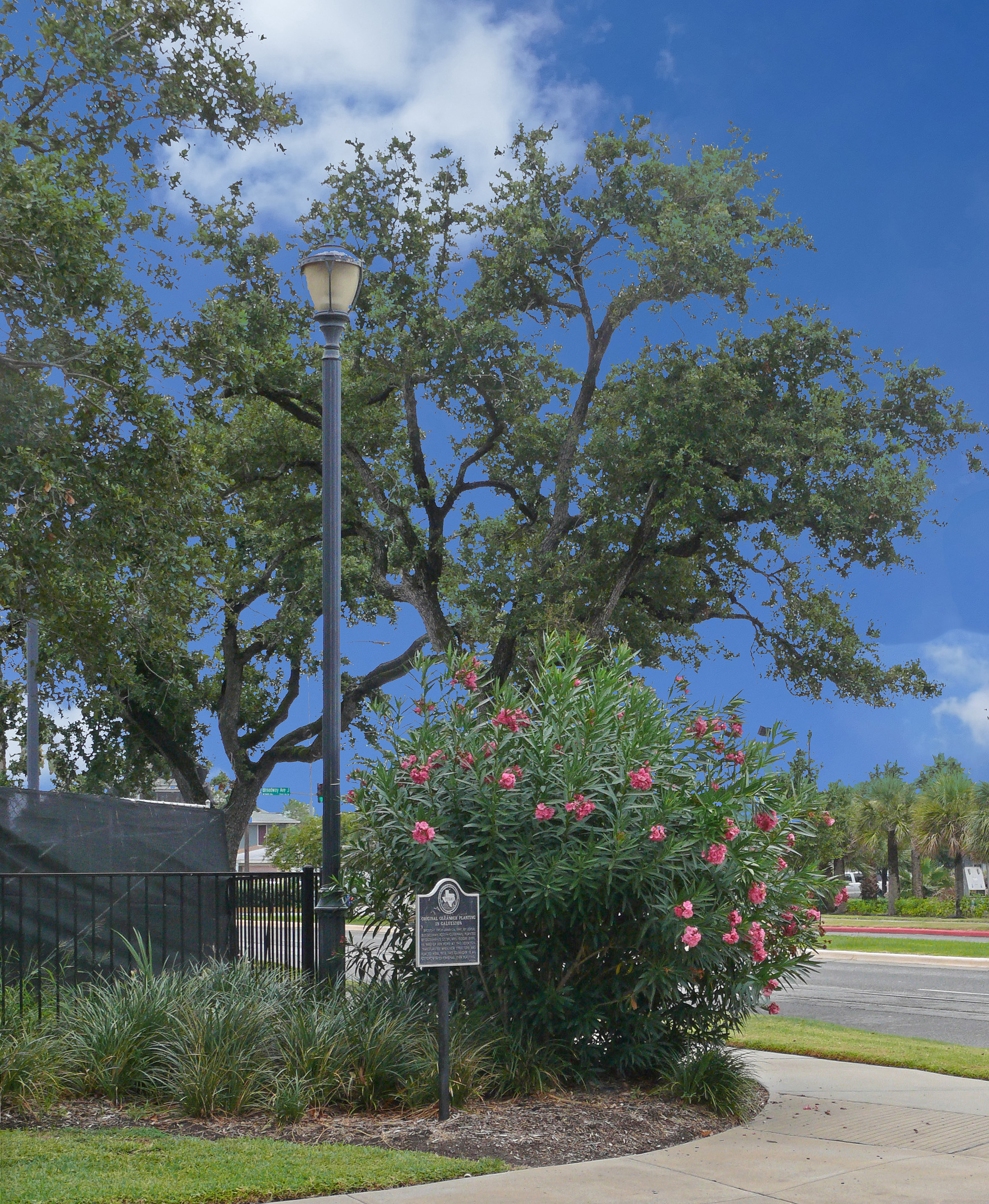
The first Oleander in Galveston, planted in 1841

Since the early 20th century, Galveston has been popularly known as the "Oleander City" because of a long history of cultivating Nerium oleander, a subtropical evergreen shrub which thrives on the island. Oleanders are a defining feature of the city; when flowering (between April and October) they add masses of color to local gardens, parks, and streets. Thousands were planted in the recovery following the Hurricane of 1900 and Galvestonians continue to treasure the plant for its low water needs, tolerance of heat, salt spray and sandy soils. This makes them especially resistant to the after-effects of hurricanes and tropical storms. Galveston is reputed to have the most diverse range of Oleander cultivars in the world, numbering over 100, with many varieties developed in the city and named after prominent Galvestonians. In 2005 the month of May was declared "Oleander Month" by the City of Galveston and there are also Oleander-themed tours of the city exploring the history of the plant on the island. Since 1967 the International Oleander Society has operated in Galveston, which promotes the cultivation of the plant, organizes an Oleander festival every spring and maintains a commemorative Oleander garden in the city.

=== Climate ===
Galveston's climate is classified as humid subtropical (Cfa in Köppen climate classification system), and is part of USDA Plant hardiness zone 10a. Prevailing winds from the south and southeast bring moisture from the Gulf of Mexico. Summer temperatures regularly exceed 90 °F (32 °C) and the area's humidity drives the heat index even higher, while nighttime lows average around 80 °F (27 °C). Winters in the area are temperate with typical January highs above 60 °F (16 °C) and lows near 50 °F (10 °C). Snowfall is generally rare; however, 15.4 in (39.1 cm) of snow fell in February 1895, making the 1894–95 winter the snowiest on record. Annual rainfall averages well over 40 inches (1,000 mm) a year with some areas typically receiving over 50 inches (1,300 mm). Temperatures reaching 20 °F (−7 °C) or 100 °F (38 °C) are quite rare, having last occurred on December 23, 1989, and June 25, 2012, respectively. Record temperatures range from 8 °F (−13 °C) on February 12, 1899, up to 104 °F (40 °C) on September 5, 2000; the record cold maximum is 25 °F (−4 °C) on February 7, 1895, and again on the date of the all-time low, while, conversely, the record warm minimum is 87 °F (31 °C) set on August 31 – September 3, 2020. On average, the warmest night is at 84 °F (29 °C), seldom straying far from averages.

Hurricanes are an ever-present threat during the summer and fall season, which puts Galveston in Coastal Windstorm Area. Galveston Island and the Bolivar Peninsula are generally at the greatest risk among the communities near the Galveston Bay. However, though the island and peninsula provide some shielding, the bay shoreline still faces significant danger from storm surge. Talks of building a coastal storm barrier with a mix of federal and state funding to protect Galveston and Houston have been ongoing for years.

Climate data for Galveston, Texas (Scholes Int'l), 1991−2020 normals, (Note: Mean monthly maxima and minima (i.e. the highest and lowest temperature readings during an entire month or year) calculated based on data at said thread from 1991 to 2020, i.e. the COOP station from January 1981 to December 1996, and Scholes Int'l from January 1997 to December 2010.) extremes 1871−present (Note: Official records for Galveston were kept at an unknown location from April 1871 to August 1946, at the COOP station from September 1946 to December 1996, and at Scholes Int'l since January 1997. The temperature record dates back to June 1874. Therefore, precipitation day normals are not currently available at Scholes Int'l. For more information, see ThreadEx Archived May 19, 2006, at the Wayback Machine.)
| Month | Jan | Feb | Mar | Apr | May | Jun | Jul | Aug | Sep | Oct | Nov | Dec | Year |
|---|---|---|---|---|---|---|---|---|---|---|---|---|---|
| Record high °F (°C) | 81 (27) | 83 (28) | 89 (32) | 95 (35) | 94 (34) | 100 (38) | 101 (38) | 100 (38) | 104 (40) | 94 (34) | 86 (30) | 82 (28) | 104 (40) |
| Mean maximum °F (°C) | 74.1 (23.4) | 75.8 (24.3) | 79.2 (26.2) | 83.9 (28.8) | 88.2 (31.2) | 92.5 (33.6) | 93.5 (34.2) | 95.6 (35.3) | 93.6 (34.2) | 88.1 (31.2) | 81.4 (27.4) | 76.5 (24.7) | 96.4 (35.8) |
| Mean daily maximum °F (°C) | 63.2 (17.3) | 66.4 (19.1) | 72.0 (22.2) | 78.0 (25.6) | 84.0 (28.9) | 89.5 (31.9) | 91.3 (32.9) | 92.0 (33.3) | 88.7 (31.5) | 82.1 (27.8) | 72.4 (22.4) | 65.5 (18.6) | 78.8 (26.0) |
| Daily mean °F (°C) | 56.0 (13.3) | 59.3 (15.2) | 65.2 (18.4) | 71.5 (21.9) | 78.2 (25.7) | 82.8 (28.2) | 85.5 (29.7) | 85.9 (29.9) | 82.4 (28.0) | 75.3 (24.1) | 65.5 (18.6) | 58.5 (14.7) | 72.2 (22.3) |
| Mean daily minimum °F (°C) | 48.9 (9.4) | 52.3 (11.3) | 58.4 (14.7) | 65.0 (18.3) | 72.4 (22.4) | 78.1 (25.6) | 79.7 (26.5) | 79.8 (26.6) | 76.1 (24.5) | 68.6 (20.3) | 58.7 (14.8) | 51.6 (10.9) | 65.8 (18.8) |
| Mean minimum °F (°C) | 34.5 (1.4) | 39.0 (3.9) | 43.6 (6.4) | 51.6 (10.9) | 62.5 (16.9) | 71.1 (21.7) | 74.1 (23.4) | 74.1 (23.4) | 67.1 (19.5) | 53.7 (12.1) | 42.3 (5.7) | 37.1 (2.8) | 32.3 (0.2) |
| Record low °F (°C) | 11 (−12) | 8 (−13) | 26 (−3) | 38 (3) | 50 (10) | 57 (14) | 66 (19) | 67 (19) | 52 (11) | 39 (4) | 26 (−3) | 14 (−10) | 8 (−13) |
| Average precipitation inches (mm) | 4.30 (109) | 2.14 (54) | 3.02 (77) | 2.06 (52) | 3.04 (77) | 4.23 (107) | 3.41 (87) | 4.71 (120) | 6.65 (169) | 5.15 (131) | 4.28 (109) | 4.23 (107) | 47.22 (1,199) |
| Average snowfall inches (cm) | 0.0 (0.0) | 0.0 (0.0) | 0.0 (0.0) | 0.0 (0.0) | 0.0 (0.0) | 0.0 (0.0) | 0.0 (0.0) | 0.0 (0.0) | 0.0 (0.0) | 0.0 (0.0) | 0.0 (0.0) | 0.1 (0.25) | 0.1 (0.25) |
| Average precipitation days (≥ 0.01 in) | 9.4 | 7.7 | 7.1 | 5.8 | 5.2 | 8.5 | 8.7 | 8.3 | 9.6 | 7.4 | 7.7 | 9.7 | 95.1 |
| Average snowy days (≥ 0.1 in) | 0.0 | 0.0 | 0.0 | 0.0 | 0.0 | 0.0 | 0.0 | 0.0 | 0.0 | 0.0 | 0.0 | 0.1 | 0.1 |
| Mean monthly sunshine hours | 145.0 | 163.4 | 209.0 | 225.5 | 265.7 | 298.5 | 309.0 | 280.4 | 237.9 | 237.2 | 176.9 | 150.5 | 2,699 |
| Percentage possible sunshine | 44 | 52 | 56 | 58 | 63 | 71 | 72 | 69 | 64 | 67 | 55 | 47 | 61 |
Source: NOAA (sun 1961–1990)

== Demographics ==
Historical population
| Census | Pop. | Note | %± |
|---|---|---|---|
| 1850 | 4,177 | | — |
| 1860 | 7,307 | | 74.9% |
| 1870 | 13,818 | | 89.1% |
| 1880 | 22,248 | | 61.0% |
| 1890 | 29,084 | | 30.7% |
| 1900 | 37,789 | | 29.9% |
| 1910 | 36,981 | | −2.1% |
| 1920 | 44,255 | | 19.7% |
| 1930 | 52,938 | | 19.6% |
| 1940 | 60,862 | | 15.0% |
| 1950 | 66,568 | | 9.4% |
| 1960 | 67,175 | | 0.9% |
| 1970 | 61,809 | | −8.0% |
| 1980 | 61,902 | | 0.2% |
| 1990 | 59,070 | | −4.6% |
| 2000 | 57,247 | | −3.1% |
| 2010 | 47,743 | | −16.6% |
| 2020 | 53,695 | | 12.5% |
| 2024 (est.) | 53,538 | | −0.3% |
U.S. Decennial Census; 2020 Census

As of the 2020 census, Galveston had a population of 53,695.

=== Racial and ethnic composition ===
Galveston city, Texas – Racial and ethnic composition Note: the US Census treats Hispanic/Latino as an ethnic category. This table excludes Latinos from the racial categories and assigns them to a separate category. Hispanics/Latinos may be of any race.
| Race / Ethnicity (NH = Non-Hispanic) | Pop 2010 | Pop 2020 | % 2010 | % 2020 |
|---|---|---|---|---|
| White alone (NH) | 21,500 | 25,386 | 45.03% | 47.28% |
| Black or African American alone (NH) | 8,895 | 8,785 | 18.63% | 16.36% |
| Native American or Alaska Native alone (NH) | 205 | 187 | 0.43% | 0.35% |
| Asian alone (NH) | 1,479 | 1,669 | 3.10% | 3.11% |
| Pacific Islander alone (NH) | 23 | 39 | 0.05% | 0.07% |
| Some Other Race alone (NH) | 44 | 199 | 0.09% | 0.37% |
| Mixed Race or Multi-Racial (NH) | 672 | 1,651 | 1.41% | 3.07% |
| Hispanic or Latino (any race) | 14,925 | 15,779 | 31.26% | 29.39% |
| Total | 47,743 | 53,695 | 100.00% | 100.00% |

=== 2020 census ===
The median age was 42.7 years, with 17.5% of residents under the age of 18 and 19.7% 65 years of age or older. For every 100 females there were 99.2 males, and for every 100 females age 18 and over there were 98.6 males age 18 and over.

According to the 2020 Household Type table, there were 23,375 households in Galveston, including 12,505 families. Of these households, 21.5% had children under the age of 18 living in them; 33.2% were married-couple households, 25.3% were households with a male householder and no spouse or partner present, and 34.9% were households with a female householder and no spouse or partner present. About 39.0% of all households were made up of individuals and 13.6% had someone living alone who was 65 years of age or older.

There were 34,259 housing units, of which 31.8% were vacant. The homeowner vacancy rate was 3.0% and the rental vacancy rate was 14.9%.

98.0% of residents lived in urban areas, while 2.0% lived in rural areas.

Racial composition as of the 2020 census
| Race | Number | Percent |
|---|---|---|
| White | 29,341 | 54.6% |
| Black or African American | 9,030 | 16.8% |
| American Indian and Alaska Native | 528 | 1.0% |
| Asian | 1,705 | 3.2% |
| Native Hawaiian and Other Pacific Islander | 52 | 0.1% |
| Some other race | 5,880 | 11.0% |
| Two or more races | 7,159 | 13.3% |
| Hispanic or Latino (of any race) | 15,779 | 29.4% |

== Economy ==
=== Port of Galveston ===
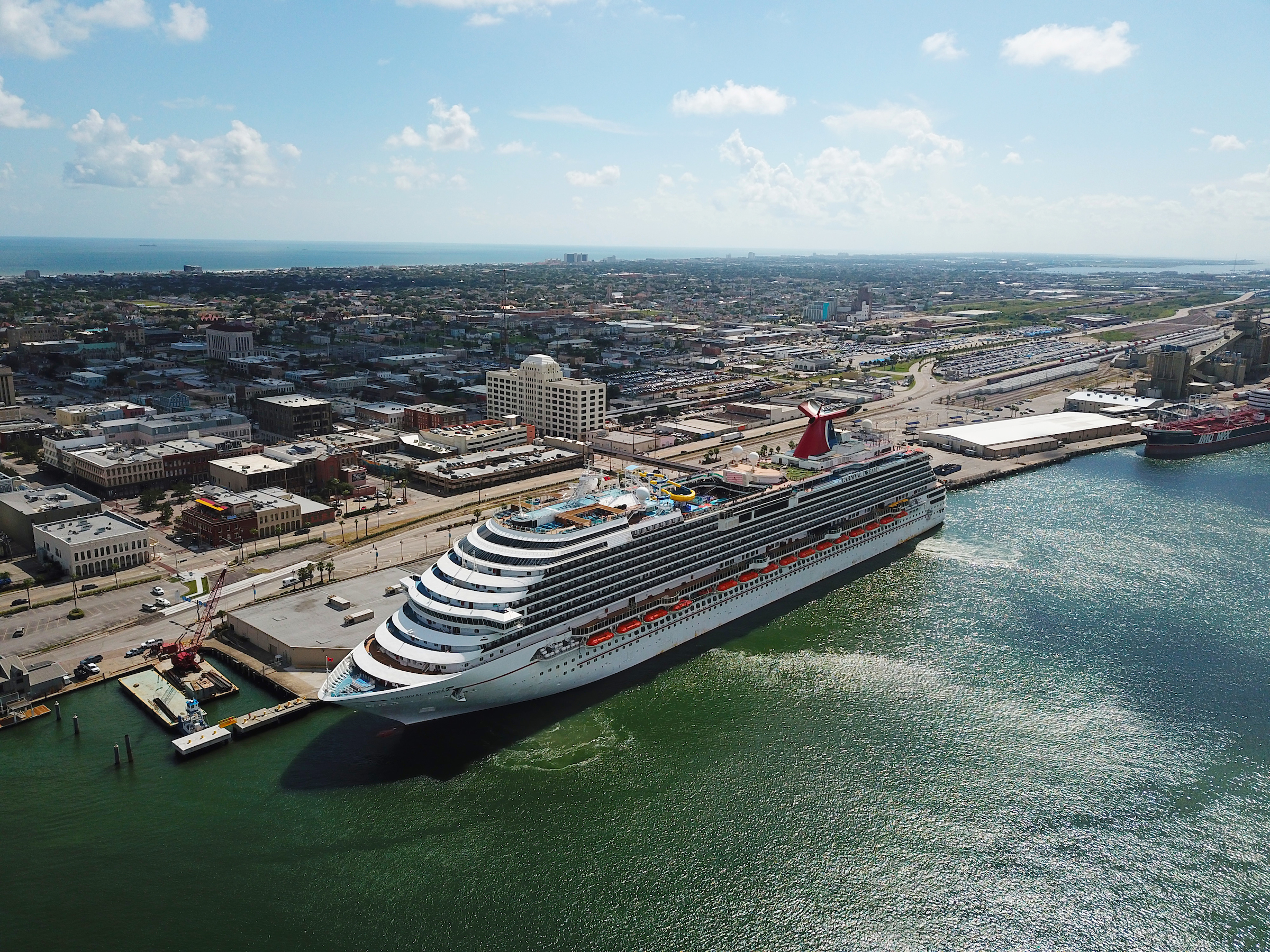
Carnival Dream docked at the Port of Galveston

The Port of Galveston, also called Galveston Wharves, began as a trading post in 1825. Today, the port has grown to 850 acres (3.4 km^{2}) of port facilities. The port is located on the Gulf Intracoastal Waterway, on the north side of Galveston Island, with some facilities on Pelican Island. The port has facilities to handle all types of cargo including containers, dry and liquid bulk, breakbulk, Roll-on/roll-off, refrigerated cargo and project cargoes.

The port also serves as a passenger cruise ship terminal for cruise ships operating in the Caribbean. The terminal was home port to two Carnival Cruise Lines vessels, the Carnival Conquest and the Carnival Ecstasy. In November 2011 the company made Galveston home port to its 3,960-passenger mega-ships Carnival Magic and Carnival Triumph as well. In 2015, Carnival Freedom relocated to Galveston, sailing seven-day cruises. Carnival replaced Carnival Magic and Carnival Triumph in the first half of 2016 with Carnival Breeze and Carnival Liberty, respectively, but replaced Liberty with Carnival Valor later in the year due to mechanical issues. Carnival Breeze and Carnival Freedom sail seven-day Caribbean cruises, and Carnival Valor sails four- and five-day Caribbean cruises from Galveston. Carnival planned on replacing Breeze with Carnival Vista in 2018, and Valor with Carnival Dream in 2019. Galveston is the home port to Royal Caribbean International's, MS Liberty of the Seas, which is the largest cruise ship ever based here and one of the largest ships in the world. In September 2012 Disney Cruise Line's Disney Magic also became based in Galveston, offering four-, six-, seven-, and eight-day cruises to the Caribbean and the Bahamas.

=== Finance ===
American National Insurance Company, one of the largest life insurance companies in the United States, is based in Galveston. The company and its subsidiaries operate in all 50 U.S. states, the District of Columbia, Puerto Rico, and American Samoa. Through its subsidiary, American National de México, Compañía de Seguros de Vida, it provides products and services in Mexico. Moody National Bank, with headquarters in downtown Galveston, is one of the largest privately owned Texas-based banks. Its trust department, established in 1927, administers over 12 billion dollars in assets, one of the largest in the state. In addition, the regional headquarters of Iowa-based United Fire & Casualty Company are located in the city.

=== Tourism ===
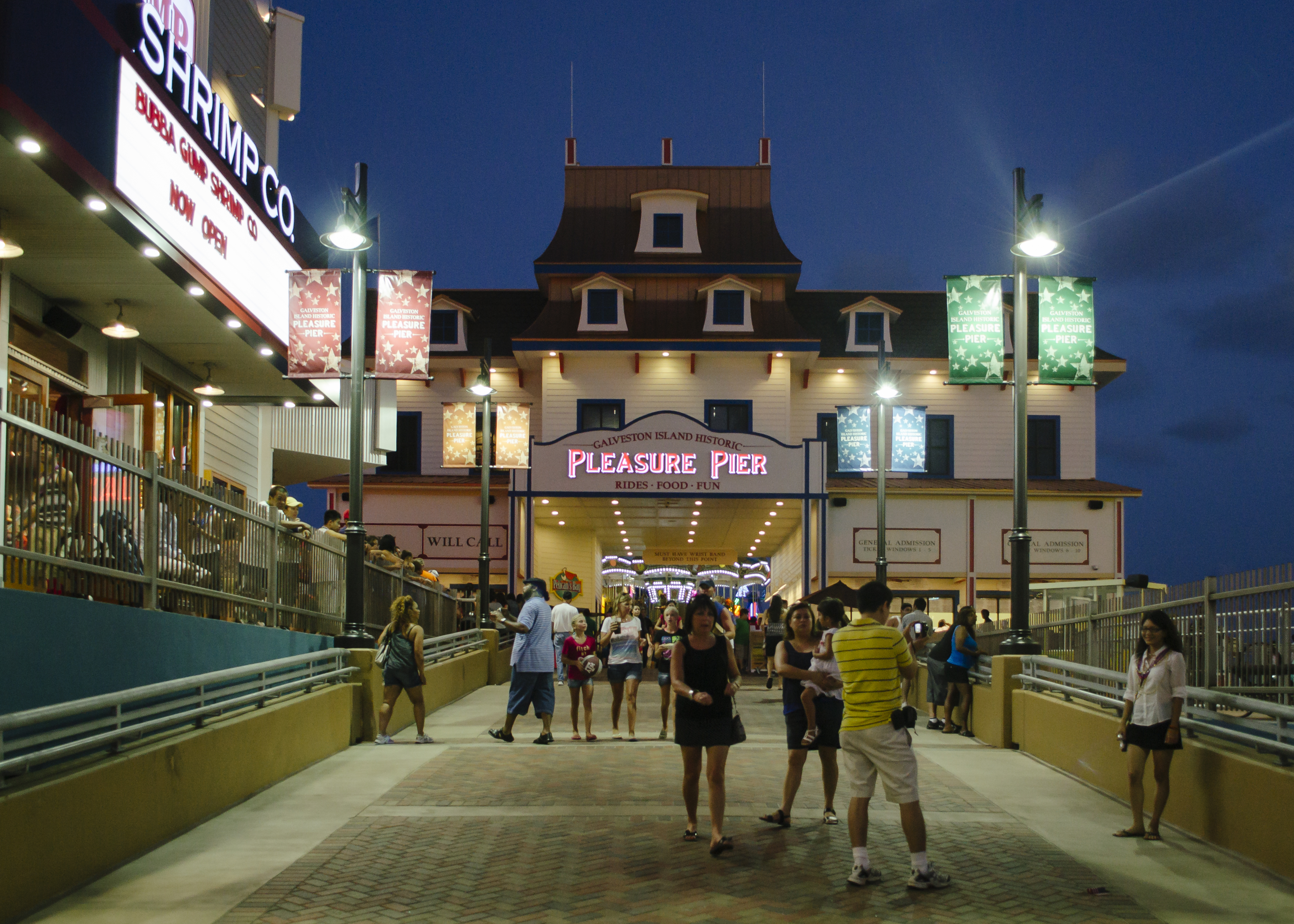
Pleasure Pier entrance

In the late 1800s Galveston was known as the "Playground of the South". Today, it still retains a shared claim to the title among major cities along the Gulf Coast states. Galveston is a popular tourist destination which in 2007 brought $808 million to the local economy and attracted 5.4 million visitors. The city features an array of lodging options, including hotels such as the historic Hotel Galvez and Tremont House, vintage bed and breakfast inns, and beachfront condominiums.

The city's tourist attractions include the Galveston Island Historic Pleasure Pier, Texas Tides Water Park (formerly Schlitterbahn Galveston), Moody Gardens botanical park, the Ocean Star Offshore Drilling Rig & Museum, Galveston Railroad Museum, The Cradle, a downtown neighborhood of historic buildings known as The Strand, many historical museums and mansions, and miles of beach front from the East End's Porretto Beach, Stewart Beach to the West End pocket parks. Previously Galveston had a 40-acre (16 ha) aquarium theme park called Sea-Arama Marineworld, which opened in 1965, closed in January 1990, and was demolished in 2006.

The Strand plays host to a yearly Mardi Gras festival, Galveston Island Jazz & Blues Festival and a Victorian-themed Christmas festival called Dickens on the Strand (honoring the works of novelist Charles Dickens, especially A Christmas Carol) in early December. Galveston is home to several historic ships: the tall ship Elissa (the official Tall Ship of Texas) at the Texas Seaport Museum and USS Cavalla and USS Stewart, both berthed at Seawolf Park on nearby Pelican Island. Galveston is ranked the number one cruise port on the Gulf Coast and fourth in the United States.

The Galveston Summer Musicals was a professional summer stock theater company performing at Galveston's Moody Gardens. Prior to 2004, they performed at the Mary Moody Northen Amphitheater in West Galveston Island.

== Arts and culture ==
=== Galveston Arts Center ===
Incorporated in 1986, Galveston Arts Center (GAC) is a non-profit, non-collecting arts organization. The center exhibits contemporary art, often by Texas-based artists, and offers educational and outreach programs. Notably, GAC organizes and produces Galveston ArtWalk. Museum entry is free to the public.

Galveston Arts Center is located in the historic 1878 First National Bank Building on the Strand. This Italianate-style 1900 Storm survivor was extensively damaged during Hurricane Ike in 2008, forcing the center to temporarily relocate to a nearby facility on Market Street. After a lengthy fundraising campaign, the total restoration of the original building was completed and Galveston Arts Center returned to the Strand in 2015.

=== Galveston ArtWalk ===
ArtWalk takes place approximately every six weeks on Saturday evenings throughout the year. ArtWalk is organized by Galveston Arts Center, which releases an ArtWalk brochure featuring a map of participating venues as well as descriptions of shows and exhibits. Venues include GAC, Galveston Artist Residency and artist's studios and galleries. Additionally, art is shown in "other walls"—for example MOD Coffeehouse or Mosquito Cafe—or outdoors at Art Market on Market Street. Musicians perform outdoors and at venues such as the Proletariat Gallery & Public House or Old Quarter Acoustic Cafe. While most ArtWalk events are concentrated downtown, there are a number or participants elsewhere on the island.

=== Sculpture ===
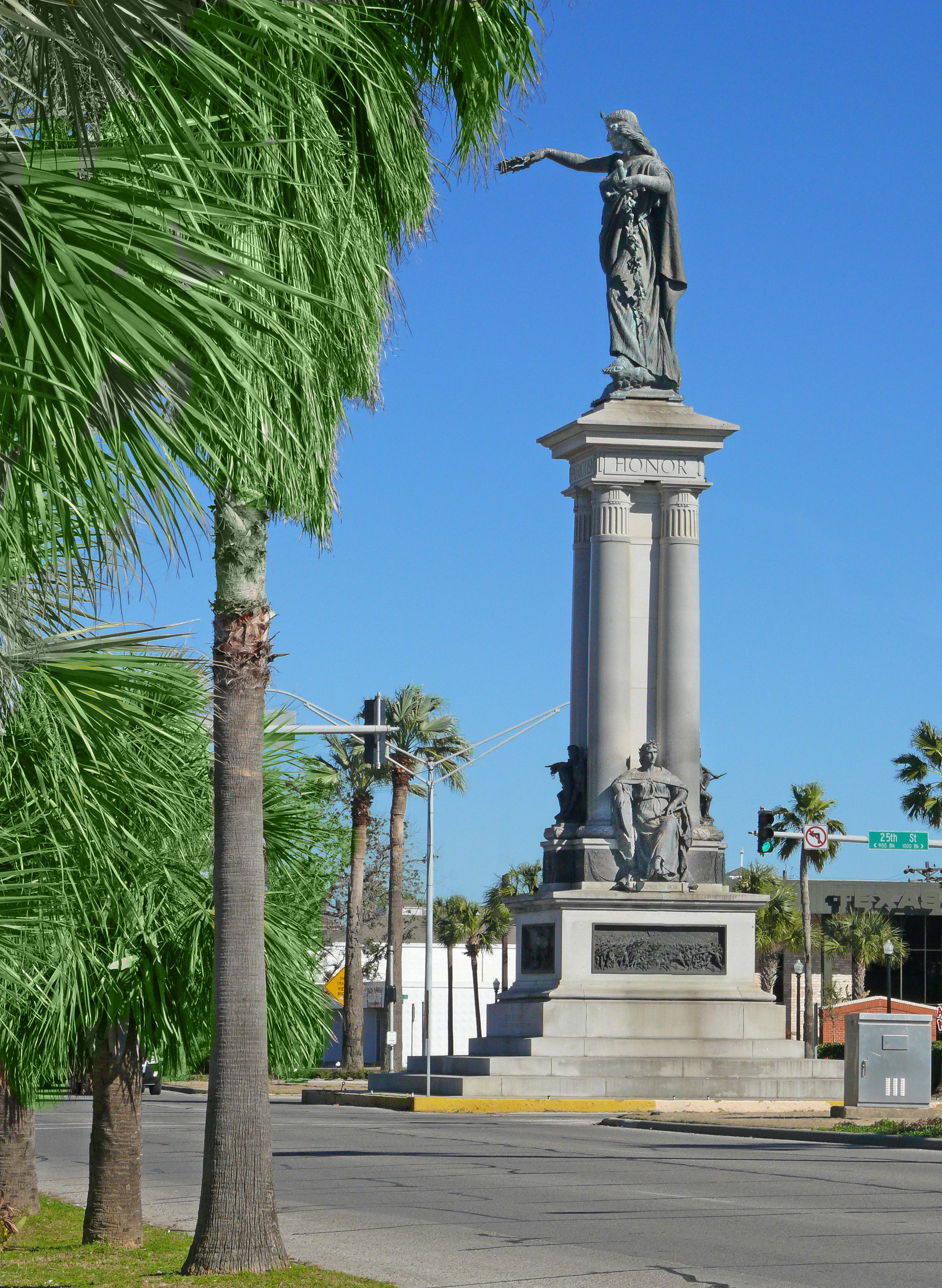
Texas Heroes Monument

Notable statues and sculptures in Galveston include:

- 1900 Storm Memorial, by David W. Moore
- Birth, by Arthur Williams
- Dignified Resignation by Louis Amateis at the Galveston County Courthouse. With his back turned to the US flag while carrying a Confederate flag, it is the only memorial in Texas to feature a Confederate sailor.
- Dolphins by David W. Moore
- High Tide, by Charles Parks
- Jack Johnson, by Adrienne Isom
- Pink Dolphin Monument, by Joe Joe Orangias
- Texas Heroes Monument, by Louis Amateis
- Hope, by Doug McLean

=== Music and performing arts ===
Galveston is home to the Galveston Symphony Orchestra, an ensemble of amateur and professional musicians formed in 1979 under the direction of Richard W. Pickar, Musical Director-Conductor.

The Galveston Ballet is a regional pre-professional ballet company and academy serving Galveston county. The company presents one full-length classical ballet in the spring of each year and one mixed repertory program in the fall, both presented at the Grand 1894 Opera House.

=== Artist residency ===
Galveston Artist Residency (GAR) grants studio space, living space and a stipend to three visual artists each year. Resident artists work in a variety of mediums and exhibit their work in the GAR Gallery and Courtyards. Located in renovated industrial structures on the west side of downtown, GAR also hosts performances and other public events.

The National Hotel Artist Lofts (NHAL) is an Artspace Projects developed property featuring twenty-seven live/work units designated as affordable housing for artists. The project brought new life to the historic E.S. Levy Building, which was left abandoned for twenty years. Originally built as the Tremont Opera House in 1870, the structure was extensively renovated to serve various functions, from offices and stores to the National Hotel. The building also housed the U.S. National Weather Bureau's Galveston office under Isaac Cline during the 1900 Storm.

Under Property Manager/Creative Director Becky Major, the unused retail space in the front of the building found a new purpose as a DIY art and music venue, despite its gutted and undeveloped state. In May 2015, the newly renovated space reopened as the Proletariat Gallery & Public House. This bar and gallery provides a common area for NHAL and neighborhood residents and a cultural hub for the broader community. Visual art, events and live music are regularly hosted in the space.

== Government ==
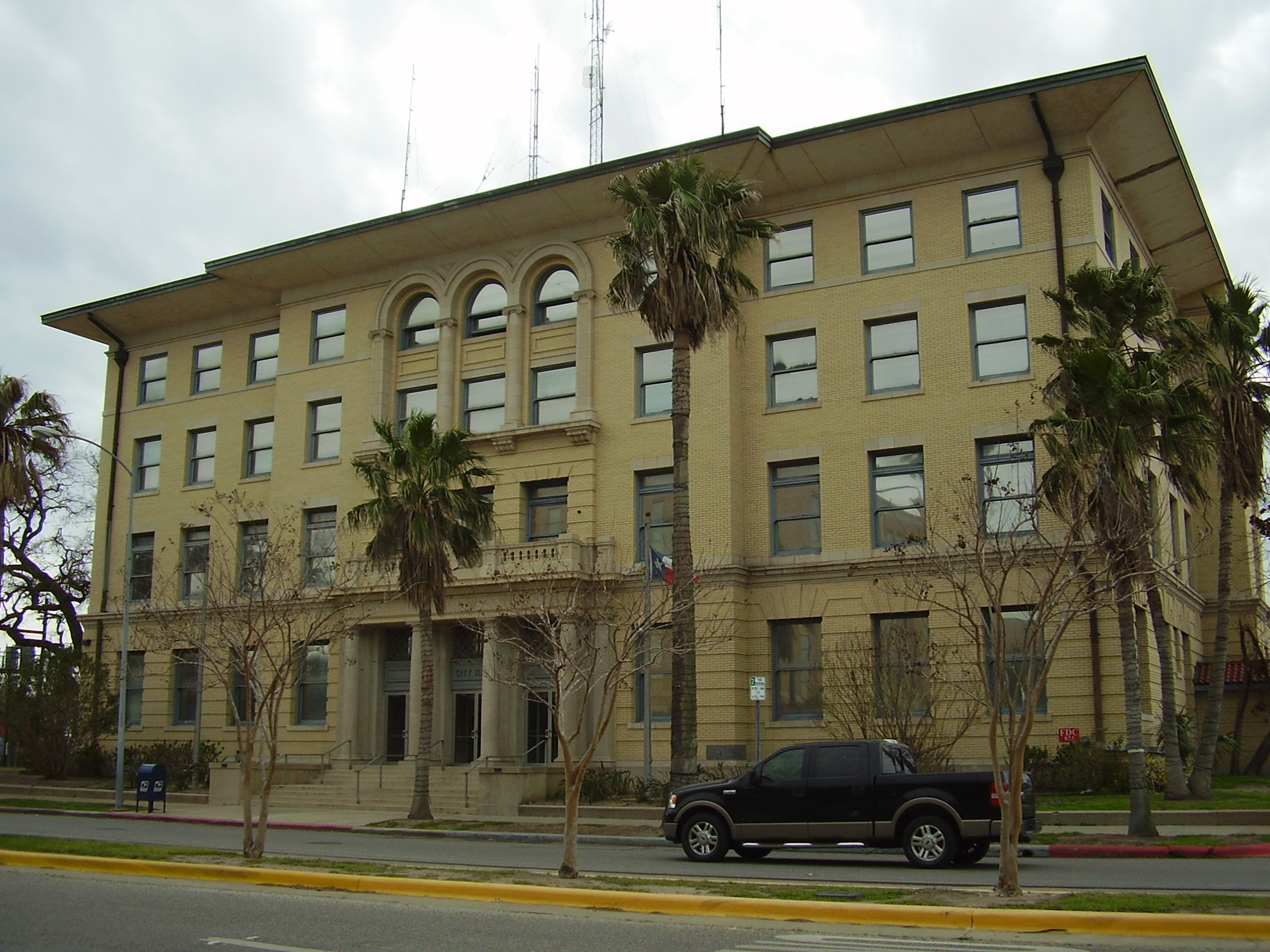
Galveston City Hall

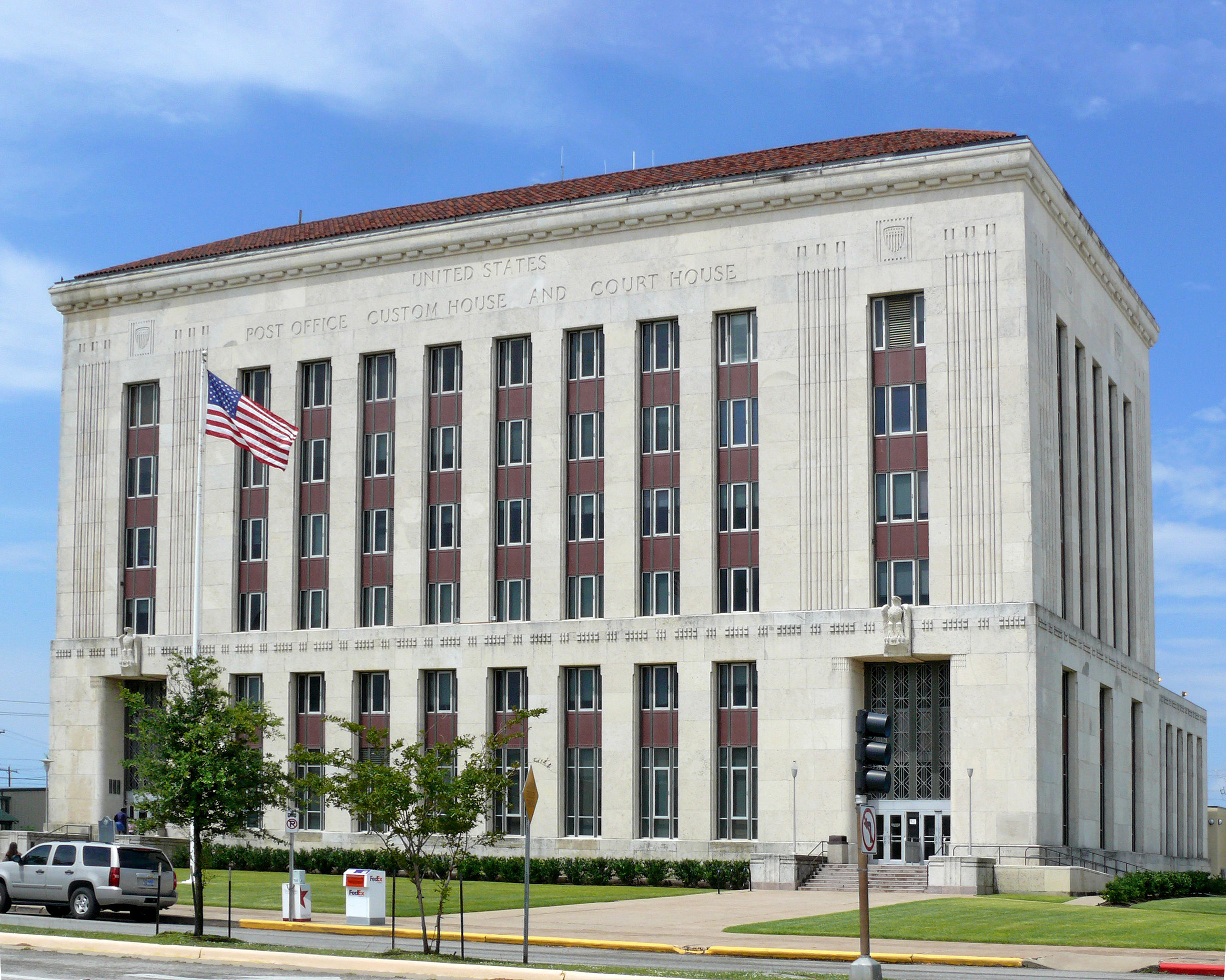
US Post Office, Custom House and Courthouse

=== City government ===
After the hurricane of 1900, the city originated the city commission form of city government (which became known as the "Galveston Plan"). The city has since adopted the council-manager form of government. Galveston's city council serves as the city's legislative branch, while the city manager works as the chief executive officer, and the municipal court system serves as the city's judicial branch.

The city council and mayor promote ordinances to establish municipal policies. The Galveston City Council consists of six elected positions, each derived from a specified electoral district. Each city council member is elected to a two-year term, while the mayor is elected to a two-year term. The city council appoints the city manager, the city secretary, the city auditor, the city attorney, and the municipal judge. The city's Tax Collector is determined by the city council and is outsourced to Galveston County. The city manager hires employees, promotes development, presents and administers the budget, and implements city council policies. Craig Brown is the incumbent mayor of Galveston.

The City of Galveston contracts with the Galveston Island Humane Society for animal shelter services.

=== County, state, and federal government ===
Galveston is the seat and second-largest city (after League City) of Galveston County in population. The Galveston County Justice Center, which houses all the county's judicial functions as well as jail, is located on 59th street. The Galveston County Administrative Courthouse, the seat of civil and administrative functions, is located near the city's downtown. Galveston is within the County Precinct 1; as of 2008 Patrick Doyle serves as the Commissioner of Precinct 1.

The Galveston County Sheriff's Office operates its law enforcement headquarters and jail from the Justice Center. The Galveston County Department of Parks and Senior Services operates the Galveston Community Center. Galveston is located in District 23 of the Texas House of Representatives. As of 2021, Mayes Middleton represents the district. Most of Galveston is within District 17 of the Texas Senate; as of 2008 Joan Huffman represents the district. A portion of Galveston is within District 11 of the Texas Senate; as of 2021 Larry Taylor represents the district. Galveston is in Texas's 14th congressional district and is represented by Republican Randy Weber as of 2012.

== Education ==
=== Colleges and universities ===
Established in 1891 with one building and fewer than 50 students, today the University of Texas Medical Branch (UTMB) campus has grown to more than 70 buildings and an enrollment of more than 2,500 students. The 84-acre (340,000 m^{2}) campus includes schools of medicine, nursing, allied health professions, and a graduate school of biomedical sciences, as well as three institutes for advanced studies & medical humanities, a major medical library, seven hospitals, a network of clinics that provide a full range of primary and specialized medical care, and numerous research facilities.

Galveston is home to two post-secondary institutions offering traditional degrees in higher education. Galveston College, a junior college that opened in 1967, and Texas A&M University at Galveston, an ocean-oriented branch campus of Texas A&M University.

=== Primary and secondary schools ===
The city of Galveston is served by Galveston Independent School District, which includes six elementary schools, two middle schools and one high school, Ball High School. There is also one magnet middle school, Austin Middle School, serving grades 5 through 8. Galveston has several state-funded charter schools not affiliated with local school districts, including kindergarten through 8th grade Ambassadors Preparatory Academy and pre-kindergarten through 8th Grade Odyssey Academy. In addition KIPP: the Knowledge Is Power Program opened KIPP Coastal Village in Galveston under the auspices of GISD.

Several private schools exist in Galveston. The Roman Catholic Archdiocese of Galveston-Houston operates two Roman Catholic private schools, including Holy Family Catholic School (K through 8th) and O'Connell College Preparatory School (9–12). Other private schools include Satori Elementary School, Trinity Episcopal School, Seaside Christian Academy, and Heritage Christian Academy.

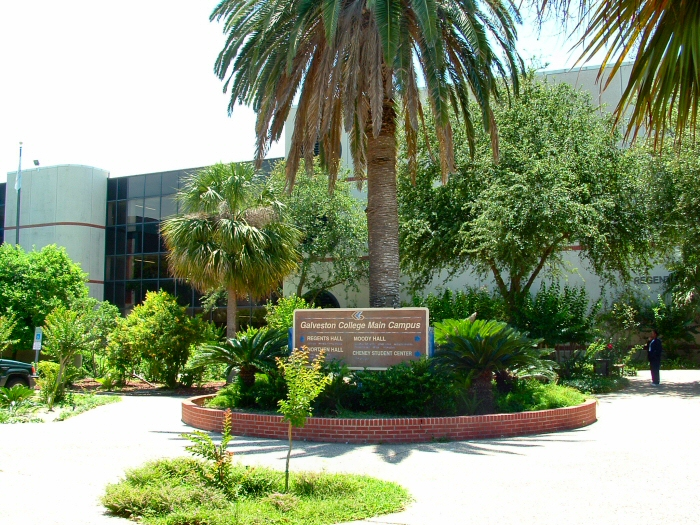
Galveston College

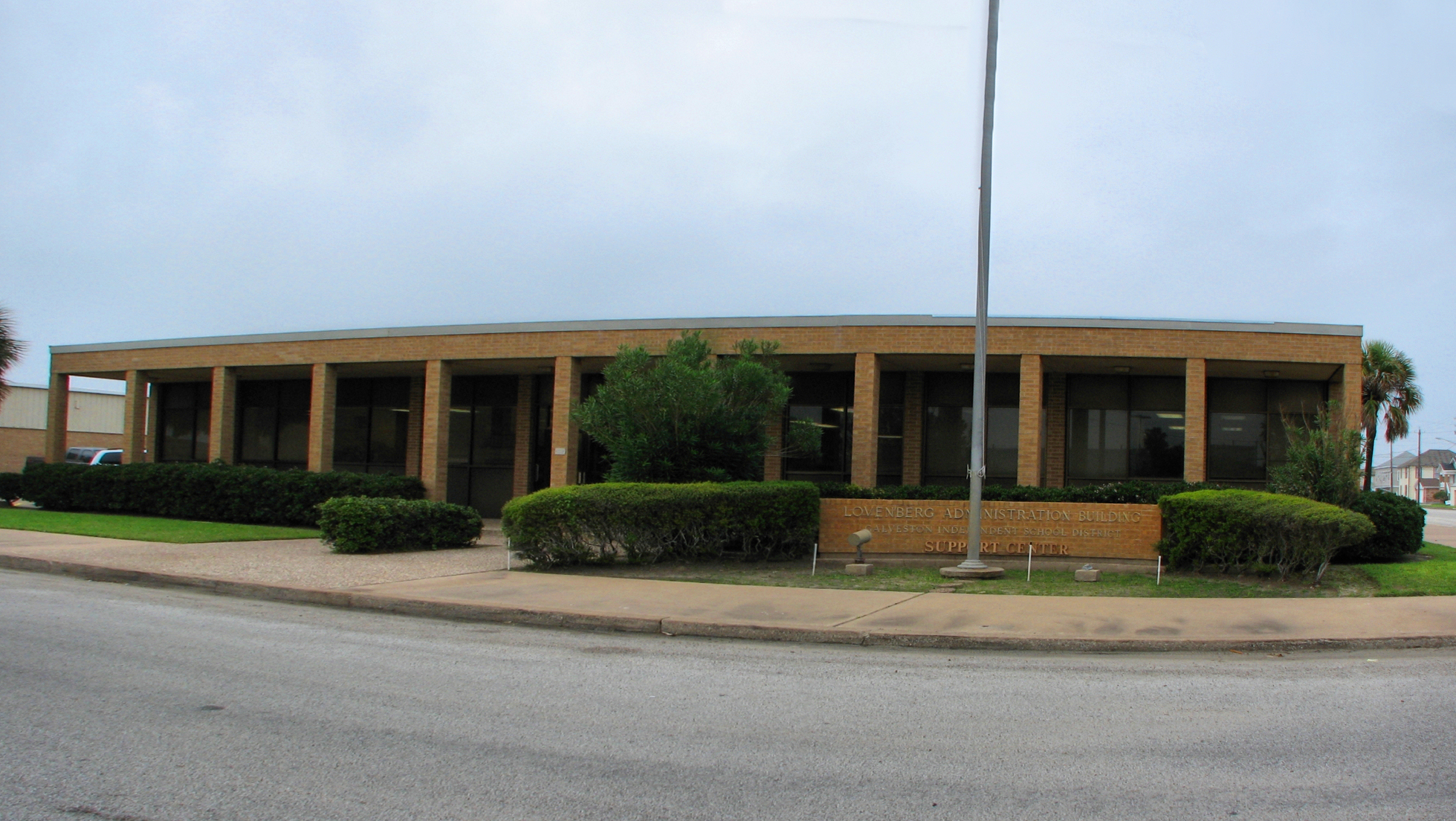
Galveston Independent School District Administration Building

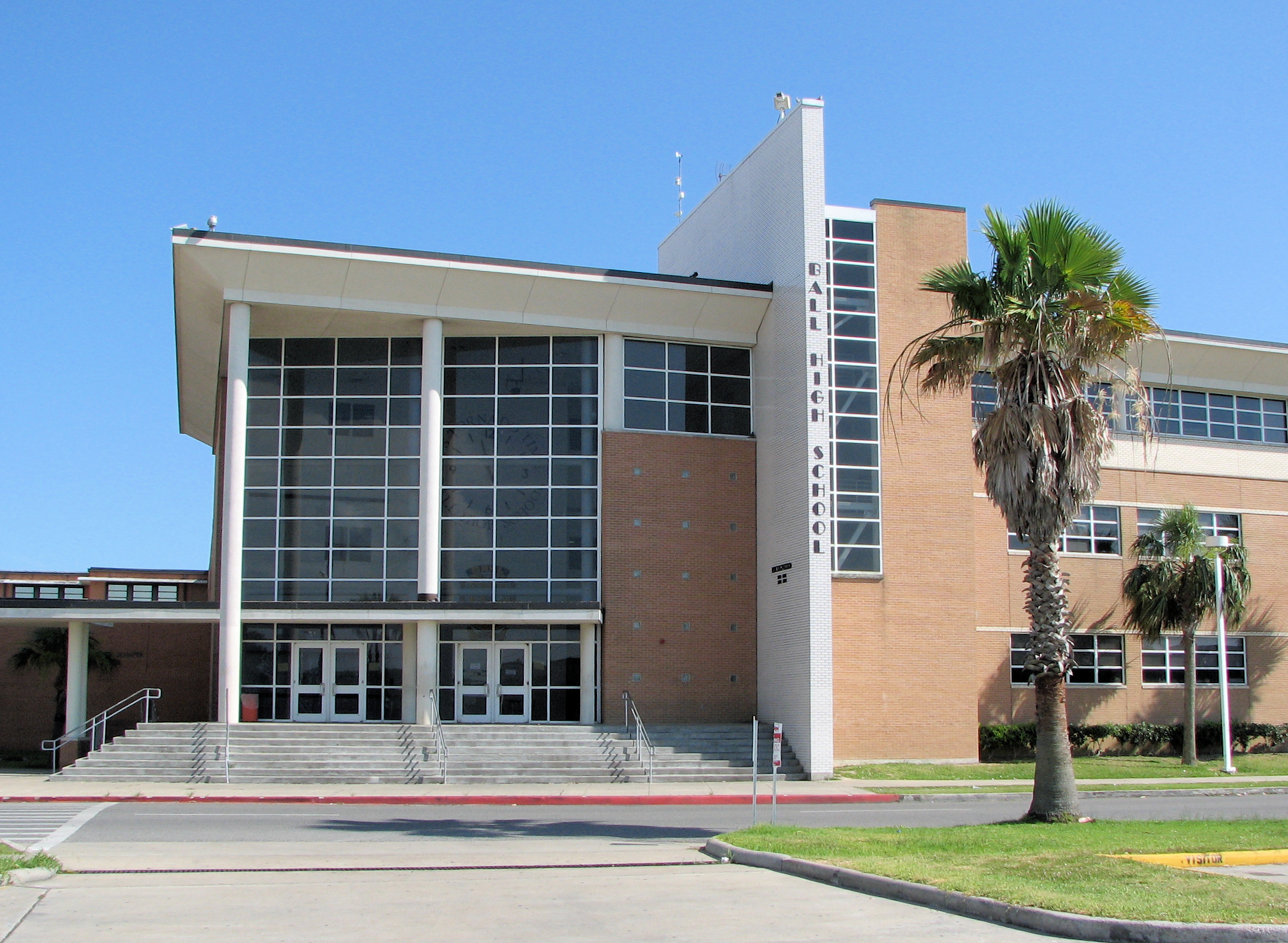
Ball High School

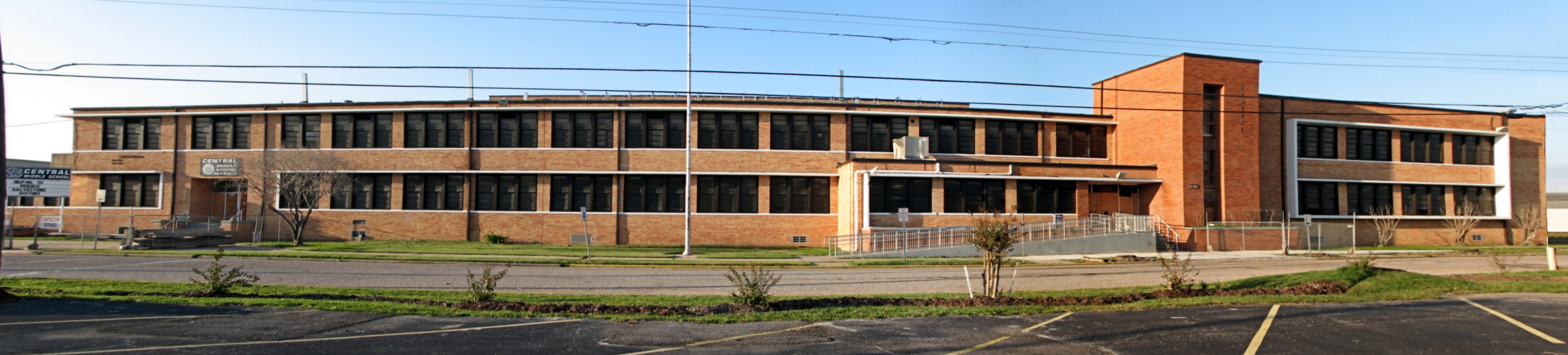
Central Middle School, formerly Central High School

== Media ==
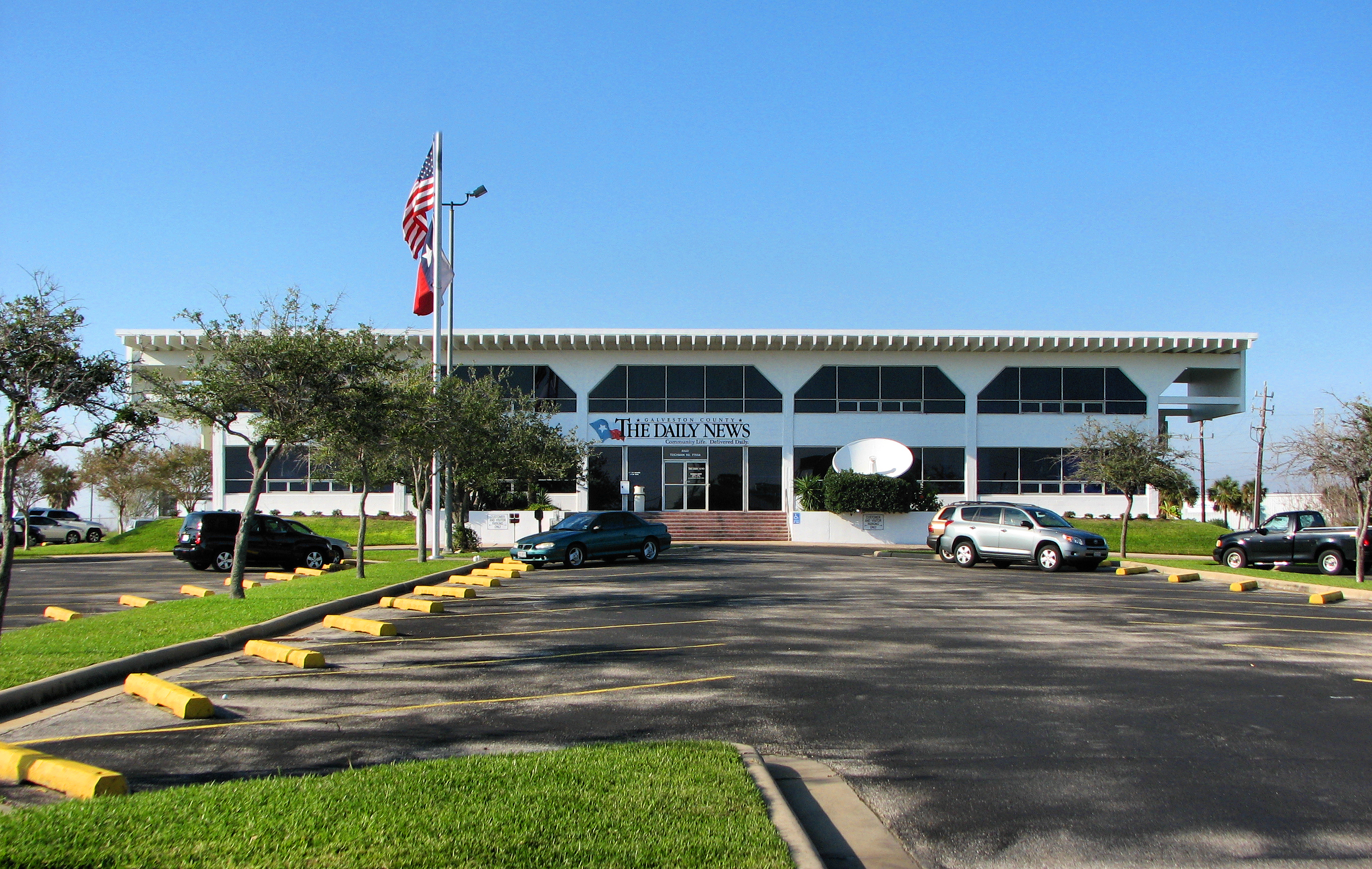
The headquarters of The Daily News

The Daily News (previously The Galveston County Daily News) founded in 1842, is the city's primary newspaper and the oldest continuously printed newspaper in Texas. It currently serves as the newspaper of record for the city and the Texas City Post serves as the newspaper of record for the county. Radio station KGBC, on air from 1947 to 2010, has previously served as a local media outlet. Television station KHOU signed on the air as KGUL-TV on March 23, 1953. Originally licensed in Galveston, KGUL was the second television station to launch in the Houston area after KPRC-TV. One of the original investors in the station was actor James Stewart, along with a small group of other Galveston investors. In June 1959, KGUL changed its call sign to KHOU and moved their main office to Houston. The local hip hop name for Galveston is "G-town".

== Infrastructure ==
=== Healthcare ===
Galveston is the home of several of the largest teaching hospitals in the state, located on the campus of the University of Texas Medical Branch at Galveston. Prior to Hurricane Ike, the University employed more than 12,000 people. Its significant growth in the 1970s and 1980s was attributable to a uniquely qualified management and medical faculty including: Mr. John Thompson; Dr. William James McGanity, Dr. William Levin, Dr. David Daeschner and many more.

Ike severely damaged the 550-bed John Sealy Hospital causing the University of Texas System Board of Regents to cut nearly one-third of the hospital staff. Since the storm, the regents have committed to spending $713 million to restore the campus, construct new medical towers, and return John Sealy Hospital to its 550-bed pre-storm capacity.

In 2011, the UT Board of Regents approved the construction of a new 13 story hospital that will be located next to John Sealy Hospital. Construction will begin in the fall of 2011, with the demolition of the old Jennie Sealy and Shriners hospitals, and continue until completion in 2016. The facility will have 250 room, 20 operating suites and 54 intensive care beds. When the new hospital is complete, along with the renovations at John Sealy, both complexes will have around 600 beds.

The university reopened their Level I Trauma Center on August 1, 2009, which had been closed for eleven months after the hurricane and, as of September 2009, had reopened 370 hospital beds.

The city is also home to a 30-bed acute burns hospital for children, the Shriners Burns Hospital at Galveston. The Galveston hospital is one of only four in the chain of 22 non-profit Shriners hospitals, that provides acute burns care. Although the Galveston Hospital was damaged by Hurricane Ike, the Shriners national convention held in July 2009 voted to repair and reopen the hospital.

Galveston County Health District Galveston Area Ambulance Authority (GAAA) operates emergency medical services covering Galveston.

=== Fire department ===
The Galveston Fire Department provides fire protection services through six fire stations and 17 pieces of apparatus. The Galveston Police Department has provided the city's police protection for more than 165 years. Over 170 authorized officers serve in three divisions.

=== Library ===
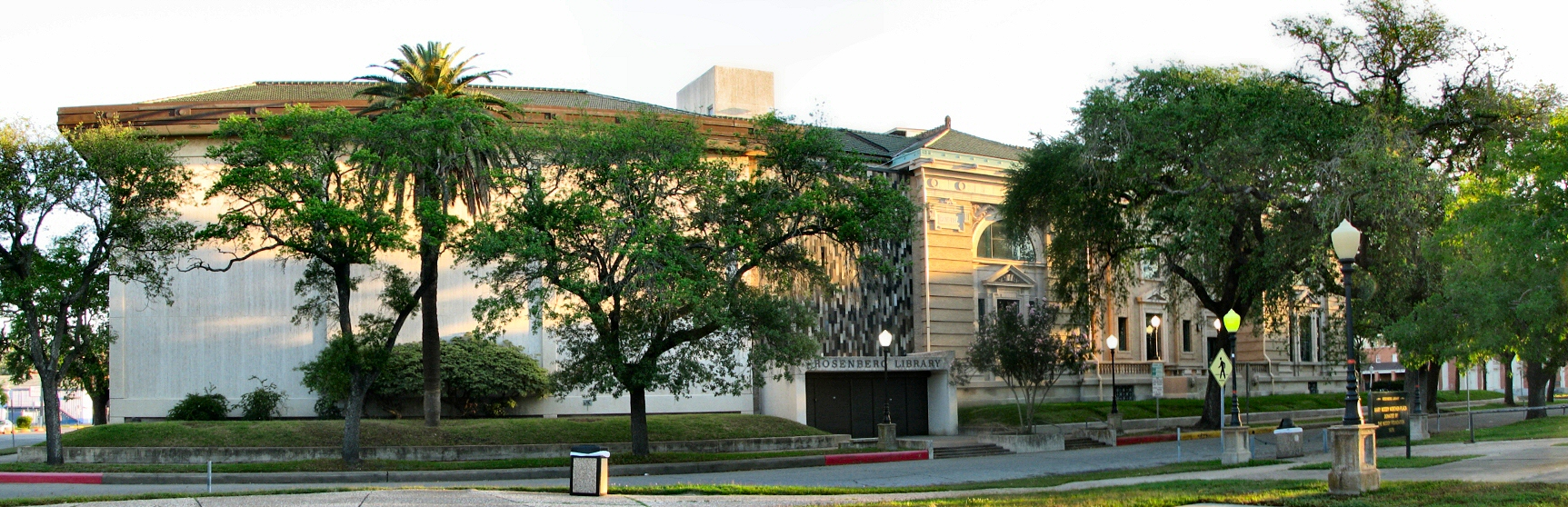
The Rosenberg Library

The city is served by the Rosenberg Library, successor to the Galveston Mercantile Library, which was founded in 1871. It is the oldest public library in the State of Texas. The library also serves as headquarters of the Galveston County Library System, and its librarian also functions as the Galveston County Librarian.

=== Courts ===
The Galveston Division of the United States District Court for the Southern District of Texas, the first federal court in Texas, is based in Galveston and has jurisdiction over the counties of Galveston, Brazoria, Chambers and Matagorda. It is housed in the United States Post Office, Customs House and Court House federal building in downtown Galveston. The United States Postal Service operates several post offices in Galveston, including the Galveston Main Post Office and the Bob Lyons Post Office Station. In addition the post office has a contract postal unit at the Medical Branch Unit on the campus of the University of Texas Medical Branch and the West Galveston Contract Postal Unit, located on the west end of Galveston Island in the beachside community of Jamaica Beach.

=== Transportation ===
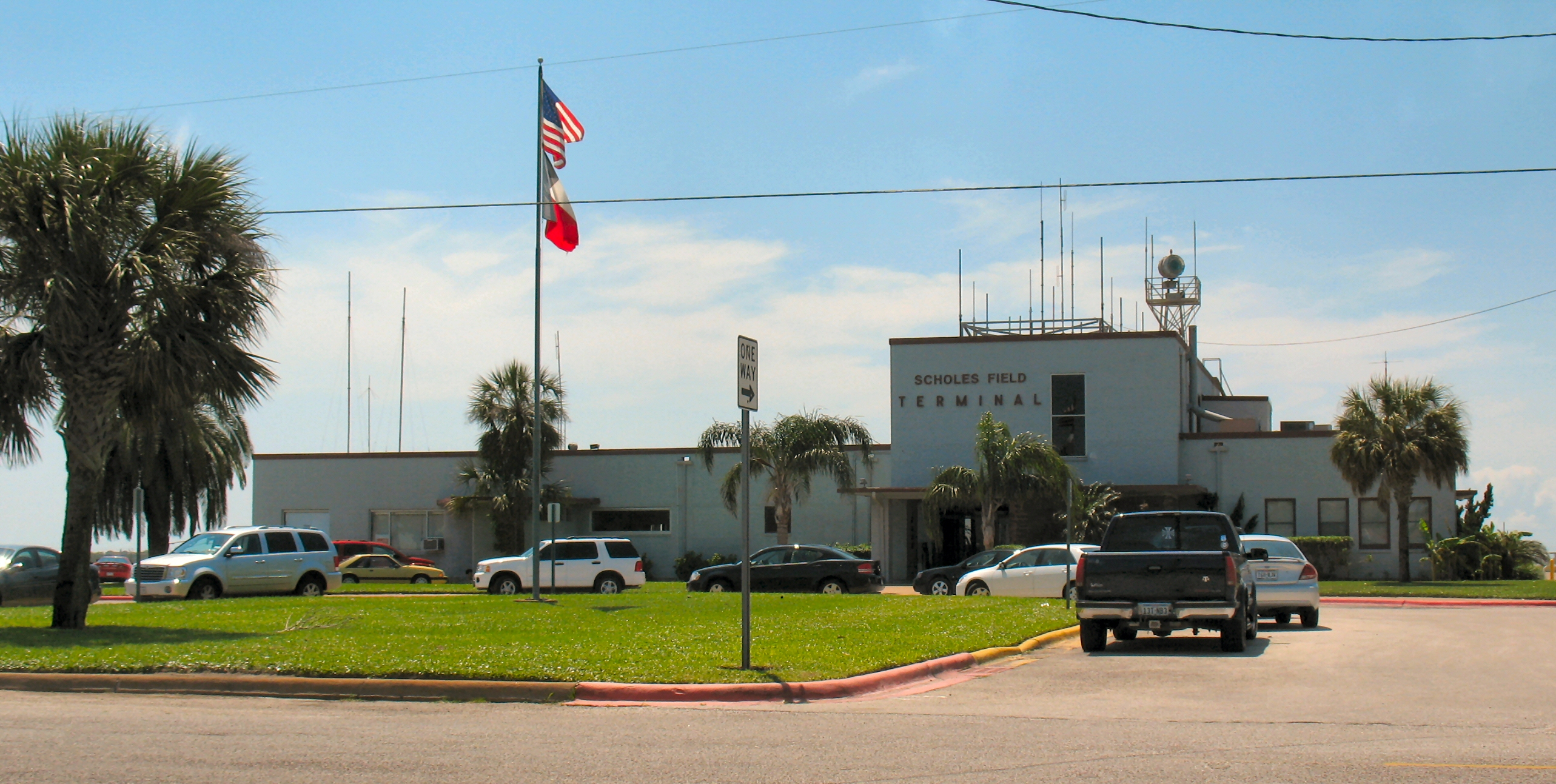
Scholes International Airport at Galveston

Civil War-era map depicting the early Galveston grid

==== Sea ====
Galveston is home to several historic ships: the tall ship Elissa (the official Tall Ship of Texas) at the Texas Seaport Museum and USS Cavalla and USS Stewart, both berthed at Seawolf Park on nearby Pelican Island. Galveston is ranked the number one cruise port on the Gulf Coast and fourth in the United States.

==== Air ====
Scholes International Airport at Galveston (IATA: GLS, ICAO: KGLS) is a two-runway airport in Galveston; the airport is primarily used for general aviation, offshore energy transportation, and some limited military operations. The nearest commercial airline service for the city is operated out of Houston through William P. Hobby Airport and George Bush Intercontinental Airport. The University of Texas Medical Branch has two heliports, one for Ewing Hall and one for its emergency room.

==== Railroad ====
The Galveston Railway, originally established and named in 1854 as the Galveston Wharf and Cotton Press Company, is a Class III terminal switching railroad that primarily serves the transportation of cargo to and from the Port of Galveston. The railway operates 32 miles (51 km) of yard track at Galveston, over a 50-acre (200,000 m^{2}) facility. The Galveston Railroad today owned Rail Link Inc. interchanges with the Union Pacific Railroad Company and BNSF Railway Company on Galveston Island. The two class one Railroads reach Galveston by way of a new vertical lift railroad causeway bridge that crosses Galveston Bay next to the Interstate-45 bridge.

The city last had direct intercity passenger train service in 1967 with the Santa Fe Railroad's Texas Chief from Chicago. Galveston is served by Amtrak Thruway service at Galveston Amtrak bus stop, with service to Houston for Amtrak's Sunset Limited, continuing further north to Longview for Amtrak's Texas Eagle.

==== Roads ====
John D. Groesbeck surveyed and mapped the town in 1837 and 1838 on behalf of the Galveston City Company. A new Galveston resident most recently from New York City, he laid out the streets based on a gridiron, and named the east–west avenues according to letters of the alphabet, with Avenue A running along the back bay on the north side of the island. He assigned numbers to names of north–south streets, with First Street on the far eastern side of the grid, and the numbered street names increased as they progressed westward. The names of some of the avenues changed over the years. Most notably, Avenue B became known as The Strand, and Avenue J became known as Broadway, a major thoroughfare which runs from the Interstate-45 viaduct to Seawall Boulevard.

Interstate 45 has a southern terminus in Galveston and serves as a main artery to Galveston from mainland Galveston County and Houston. US Route 75 used to reach Galveston before it was decommissioned in 1987 from Dallas. Farm to Market Road 3005 (locally called Seawall Boulevard) connects Galveston to Brazoria County via the San Luis Pass-Vacek Toll Bridge. State Highway 87, known locally as Broadway Street, connects the island to the Bolivar Peninsula via the Bolivar Ferry. A project to construct the proposed Bolivar Bridge to link Galveston to Bolivar Peninsula was cancelled in 2007.

- I-45
- SH 87
- SH 168
- SH 275
- Spur 342
- FM 3005

=== Transit ===
Island Transit, which operates the Galveston Island Trolley manages the city's public transportation services. Intercity bus service to Galveston was previously operated by Kerrville Bus Company; following the company's acquisition by Coach USA, service was operated by Megabus.

=== Sports ===
Galveston was home to minor league baseball from 1888 to 1955. The Galveston White Caps (1950–1955), Galveston Buccaneers (1931–1937) Galveston Sand Crabs (1889–1890, 1892, 1897–1899, 1907–1911, 1922–1924) Galveston Pirates (1912–1917, 1919–1921) and Galveston Giants (1888) all called Galveston home. Galveston was a member of the Big State League (1954–1955), Gulf Coast League (1950–1953) and Texas League (1888–1890, 1892, 1897–1899, 1907–1917, 1919–1924, 1931–1937). The teams played at Moody Stadium/White Cap Stadium (1931–1937, 1950–1955), Gulfview Park (1921–1924)/Pirate Field (1915–1920) and Beach Park (1888–1915).

== Notable people ==
Galveston has been home to many important figures in Texas and U.S. history. During the island's earliest history it became the domain of Jean Lafitte, the famed pirate and American hero of the War of 1812. Richard Bache, Jr. who settled in Galveston in 1842 and represented it in the Senate of the Second Texas Legislature in 1847 and assisted in drawing up the Constitution of 1845 was another. He was also the grandson of Benjamin Franklin, one of the Founding Fathers of the United States of America and Deborah Read. In 1886, the African-American Galveston civil rights leader Norris Wright Cuney rose to become the head of the Texas Republican Party and one of the most important Southern black leaders of the century.

British playwright and actor Charles Francis Coghlan died in Galveston in 1899 while touring with his theatre company and was initially entombed there until his body was washed out to sea in the 1900 hurricane. Portrait and landscape artist Verner Moore White moved from Galveston the day before the 1900 hurricane. While he survived, his studio and much of his portfolio were destroyed. Another survivor of the hurricane was the Hollywood director King Vidor, who made his directing debut in 1913 with the film Hurricane in Galveston. Later Jack Johnson, nicknamed the "Galveston Giant", became the first black world heavyweight boxing champion.

During the first half of the 20th century, William L. Moody Jr. established a business empire, which includes American National Insurance Company, a major national insurer, and founded the Moody Foundation, one of the largest charitable organizations in the United States. Sam Maceo, a nationally known organized crime boss, with the help of his family, was largely responsible for making Galveston a major U.S. tourist destination from the 1920s to the 1940s. Grammy-award-winning singer-songwriter Barry White was born on the island and later moved to Los Angeles.

George P. Mitchell, pioneer of hydraulic fracturing technology and developer of The Woodlands, Texas, was born and raised in Galveston.

Anita Martini, pioneering female sports journalist who was the first woman allowed in a major league locker room for a post-game press conference, was born in Galveston. Surfer Dorian "Doc" Paskowitz was born in Galveston.

Professional baseball pitcher Sig Jakucki made Galveston his home after joining the Galveston Buccaneers in 1934. He is best remembered for defeating the New York Yankees in the final game of the 1944 MLB season, giving the St. Louis Browns their only pennant. Terran Petteway, a basketball player in the Israeli Basketball Premier League, was born in Galveston.

More recently Tilman J. Fertitta, part of the Maceo bloodline, established the Landry's Restaurants corporation, which owns numerous restaurants and entertainment venues in Texas and Nevada.

Kay Bailey Hutchison was the senior senator from Texas and the first female Texas senator.

Gilbert Pena, former Republican member of the Texas House of Representatives from Pasadena, was born in Galveston in 1949 and lived there in early childhood.

Jonathan Pollard, who spied for Israel and was convicted in the US and sentenced to life in jail, was born in Galveston. The film and television actor Lee Patterson, a native of Vancouver, British Columbia, lived in Galveston and died there in 2007.

Other notable people include Brandon Backe, a former Major League Baseball pitcher for the Tampa Bay Devil Rays and Houston Astros who played in the 2005 World Series, Matt Carpenter of the St. Louis Cardinals, Mike Evans, wide receiver for the Tampa Bay Buccaneers, 1998 Heisman Trophy runner-up and pro quarterback Michael Bishop, Pittsburgh Steelers great Casey Hampton, comedian Bill Engvall, actresses Valerie Perrine and Katherine Helmond, painter Ethel Fisher, Tina Knowles fashion designer and creator of House of Deréon, mother of Beyoncé and Solange Knowles, and Grammy award-winning R&B and Jazz legend Esther Phillips, was born in Galveston in 1935.

== In media and literature ==
- "Galveston" is the name of a popular song written by Jimmy Webb and sung by Glen Campbell.
- 4 for Texas is a 1963 film set in Galveston.
- Sheldon Cooper, one of the main characters from the CBS sitcom The Big Bang Theory and its spinoff Young Sheldon, was born in Galveston.
- The Walter M. Miller Jr. novella Dark Benediction (1951) takes place partly in Galveston during the outbreak of a mysterious plague.
- Donald Barthelme's 1974 short story I Bought a Little City is about an unnamed man who invests his fortune in buying Galveston, only to sell it thereafter.
- Galveston is the primary setting and filming location for the 1989 film Night Game.
- Galveston is the setting of Sean Stewart's 2000 fantasy novel Galveston, in which a Flood of Magic takes over the island city, resulting in strange and carnivalesque adventures. It tied in 2001 with Declare, by Tim Powers, for the World Fantasy Award for Best Novel. It also won the 2001 Sunburst Award and was a preliminary nominee for the Nebula Award for Best Novel.
- The Drowning House, a novel by Elizabeth Black (2013), is an exploration of the island of Galveston, Texas, and the intertwined histories of two families who reside there.
- Galveston (2010) is the first novel by Nic Pizzolatto, the creator of the HBO series True Detective.
- The Jinx (2015), an HBO miniseries, features Galveston as the location of one of Robert Durst's murders which took place in 2001.
- In the 2016 survival horror film The Shallows, directed by Jaume Collet-Serra and starring Blake Lively, Galveston was set as the main character's hometown and is shown at the film's conclusion. However, permission to film near Galveston was refused for safety reasons.
- Magnolia Network's programming includes Restoring Galveston (formerly known as Big Texas Fix) which shows local Galveston homes being restored and remodeled.

== Sister cities ==
Galveston's sister cities are:

- Macharaviaya, Spain
- Niigata, Japan
- Stavanger, Norway
- Veracruz, Mexico

The following are no longer active as of 2018:

- Trivandrum, India
- Armavir, Armenia

== See also ==
- Galveston Movement
- History of the Jews in Galveston, Texas
- Juneteenth
- Isaac's Storm
- USS Galveston, 2 ships
