= List of conflicts involving the Texas Military =

Conflicts involving the military of the US state of Texas

The history of conflicts involving the Texas Military spans over two centuries, from 1823 to present, under the command authority (the ultimate source of lawful military orders) of four governments including the Texas governments (3), American government, Mexican government, and Confederate government.

Since 1823, Texas forces have undergone many re-designations and reorganizations. For example, the Texas Rangers were a branch of the Texas Military Forces from 1823 to 1935 providing cavalry, special operations, and military police capabilities. Administrative control (ADCON) of the Texas Rangers was transferred from the Texas Military Department to the Texas Department of Public Safety (DPS) in 1935 where they now perform duties similar to the Federal Bureau of Investigation (FBI) for Texas as a State Bureau of Investigation (SBI). The following list of conflicts reflects duty at the time as a military unit.

Conflicts in this list may apply to several categories, but they've been generally organized by the preponderance of the mission. For example, the Laredo Smallpox Riot was a civil disorder and emergency management conflict, and Operation Border Star is both a border control and counter-drug conflict.

== List Key ==
Casualty key: KIA (killed in action), WIA (wounded in action), MIA (missing in action), DIA (deserted in action), POW (prisoner of war)

Outcome key:

- Conventional Warfare / Low-intensity Conflict: Strategic, Tactical, Moral, Pyrrhic victory, or loss.
- Military Operations Other Than War: accomplished or failure.

== Texas governments ==
This list includes conflicts under the command authority of the Colony of Texas, Republic of Texas, and State of Texas.

=== Legal Authority ===
As a colony in Mexico from 1823 to 1835, the Texas Military was legally empowered by Agustín de Iturbide and the Coahuila y Tejas legislature to "organize the colonists into a body of militia to preserve tranquility." Operations were conducted under command of Stephen F. Austin.

As a sovereign republic from 1835 to 1845, the Texas Military was legally empowered by Article 1 of the Consultation and Article 2, Section 6 of Constitution of the Republic of Texas "to execute the law, to suppress insurrections, and repel invasion." Operations were conducted under command of the War Department and Adjutant General Department.

As a state of America from 1845–present, the Texas Military is legally empowered by Title 32 of the United States Code and Article 4, Section 7 of the Constitution of the State of Texas to "execute the laws of the state, to suppress insurrections, and to repel invasions". Operations are conducted under command of the Adjutant General Department and Texas Military Department.

=== Conflicts ===
==== Border control ====
Note: These conflicts are commanded by the Texas government. For related conflicts commanded by the American government, see Border control.

| Year | Conflict | Texas Military Unit(s) | Commander | Casualties | Outcome | Reference |
|---|---|---|---|---|---|---|
| 2005-2006 | Operation Linebacker | Texas State Guard Texas Air National Guard Texas Army National Guard | Unknown Unknown Unknown | 0 0 0 | Accomplished | |
| October 2006 | Operation Rio Grande | Texas State Guard Texas Air National Guard Texas Army National Guard | Unknown Unknown Unknown | 0 0 0 | Accomplished | |
| January–July 2007 | Operation Wrangler | Texas State Guard Texas Air National Guard Texas Army National Guard | Unknown Unknown Unknown | 0 0 0 | Accomplished | |
| 2007–Present | Operation Border Star | Texas State Guard Texas Air National Guard Texas Army National Guard | Unknown Unknown Unknown | Ongoing | Ongoing | |
| 2010-2012 | Operation River Watch | Texas Air National Guard Texas Army National Guard | Unknown Unknown | 0 0 | Accomplished | |
| 2011–Present | Operation Drawbridge | Texas State Guard Texas Air National Guard Texas Army National Guard | Unknown Unknown Unknown | Ongoing | Ongoing | |
| 2012–Present | Operation River Watch II | Texas Air National Guard | Unknown | Ongoing | Ongoing | |
| October 2014 | Operation Strong Safety | Texas Air National Guard Texas Army National Guard | Unknown Unknown | 0 0 | Accomplished | |
| November 2014- September 2016 | Operation Strong Safety II | Texas Air National Guard Texas Army National Guard | Unknown Unknown | | Accomplished | |
| 2021—Present | Operation Lone Star | Texas State Guard Texas Air National Guard Texas Army National Guard | Unknown Unknown Unknown | 4 Suicide 1 KIA | Ongoing | |

==== Civil disorder / Insurrection ====
| Year | Conflict | Texas Military Unit(s) | Commander | Casualties | Outcome | Reference |
|---|---|---|---|---|---|---|
| 1842 | Texas Archive War | Frontier Battalion, Texas Rangers | Thomas I. Smith / Eli Chandler | 0 | Failure | |
| 1844 | Regulator–Moderator War | Texas Militia | Travis G. Broocks / Alexander Horton | Unknown | Accomplished | |
| 1857 | Cart War | Texas Militia | Unknown | 0 | Accomplished | |
| 1886 | Laredo Election Riot | Frontier Battalion, Texas Rangers Texas Militia | Unknown Unknown | Unknown Unknown | Accomplished | |
| 1873 | Coke-Davis Controversy | Travis Rifles, Texas Militia | Unknown | 0 | Accomplished | |
| 1877-1878 | San Elizario Salt War | Frontier Battalion, Texas Rangers | John B. Tays | 0 | Accomplished | |
| 1883-1888 | Fence Cutting War | Frontier Battalion, Texas Rangers | Unknown | 0 | Accomplished | |
| 1888 | Rio Grande City Riot | Frontier Battalion, Texas Rangers San Antonio Rifles, Texas Militia Belknap Rifles, Texas Militia Houston Light Guards, Texas Militia | Unknown Unknown Unknown Unknown | 0 0 0 0 | Accomplished | |
| 1891-1893 | Garza Revolution | Frontier Battalion, Texas Rangers | Unknown | Unknown | Accomplished | |
| 1893 | Battle of Tres Jacales | Company D, Frontier Battalion, Texas Rangers | Frank Jones | 1 KIA | Failure | |
| 1899 | Laredo Smallpox Riot | Frontier Battalion, Texas Rangers | John H. Rogers | 1 WIA | Accomplished | |
| 1919 | Longview Race Riot | Texas Rangers Texas Army National Guard | Robert H. McDill / T.E. Barton / H.W. Peck | 0 0 | Accomplished | |
| 1930 | Sherman Riot | Texas Rangers Texas Army National Guard | Unknown Unknown | 0 0 | Accomplished | |
| 1931 | Red River Bridge War | Texas Rangers Texas Air National Guard Texas Army National Guard | Unknown Unknown Unknown | 0 0 0 | Inconclusive | |
| 1931 | East Texas Oilfield Riot | Texas Rangers Texas Army National Guard Texas State Guard | Unknown Unknown Unknown | 0 0 0 | Accomplished | |
| 1943 | Beaumont Riot | Eighteenth Battalion, Texas State Guard | Fred C. Stone | 0 | Accomplished | |
| 2020 | George Floyd protests | Texas State Guard Texas Air National Guard Texas Army National Guard | Unknown Unknown Unknown | 0 | Accomplished | |

==== Counterdrug ====
Note: These conflicts are commanded by the Texas government. For related conflicts commanded by the American government, see War on Drugs.

| Year | Conflict | Texas Military Unit(s) | Commander | Casualties | Outcome | Reference |
|---|---|---|---|---|---|---|
| 1920-1933 | Los Tequileros | Texas Rangers | Unknown | Unknown | Victory | |
| 1978–Present | DSCA air interdiction | Texas Air National Guard | Unknown | Ongoing | Ongoing | |
| 1989–Present | Joint Counterdrug Task Force | Domestic Operations Command | Miguel Torres | Ongoing | Ongoing | |
| | Operation Linebacker | Texas State Guard Texas Air National Guard Texas Army National Guard | Unknown Unknown Unknown | 0 0 0 | Victory | |
| | Operation Rio Grande | Texas State Guard Texas Air National Guard Texas Army National Guard | Unknown Unknown Unknown | 0 0 0 | Victory | |
| 2006–Present | Mexican drug war | Texas Air National Guard Texas Army National Guard | Unknown Unknown | Ongoing | Ongoing | |
| 2007 | Operation Wrangler | Texas State Guard Texas Air National Guard Texas Army National Guard | Unknown Unknown Unknown | 0 0 0 | Victory | |
| 2008–Present | Operation Border Star | Texas State Guard Texas Air National Guard Texas Army National Guard | Unknown Unknown Unknown | Ongoing | Ongoing | |
| 2010-2012 | Operation River Watch | Texas Air National Guard Texas Army National Guard | Unknown Unknown | 0 0 | Victory | |
| 2011–Present | Operation Drawbridge | Texas State Guard Texas Air National Guard Texas Army National Guard | Unknown Unknown Unknown | Ongoing | Ongoing | |
| 2011–Present | Operation Crackdown | Domestic Operations Command | Unknown | Ongoing | Ongoing | |
| 2012–Present | Operation River Watch II | Texas Air National Guard | Unknown | Ongoing | Ongoing | |
| 2014 | Operation Strong Safety | Texas Air National Guard Texas Army National Guard Texas State Guard | Unknown Unknown | 0 0 | Victory | |

==== Covert ====
| Year | Conflict | Texas Military Unit(s) | Commander | Casualties | Outcome | Reference |
|---|---|---|---|---|---|---|
| 1839 | Battle of Alcantra | Texas Militia | Samuel W. Jordan | 7 KIA | Victory | |
| 1840 | Battle of Saltillo | Texas Militia | Samuel W. Jordan | Unknown | Loss | |
| 1843 | Snively Expedition | Battalion of Invincibles, Texas Militia | Jacob Snively | Unknown | Inconclusive | |

==== Emergency management ====
| Year | Conflict | Type | Texas Military Unit(s) | Commander | Casualties | Outcome | Reference |
|---|---|---|---|---|---|---|---|
| 1837 | Racer's Hurricane | Natural disaster | Texas Militia | Unknown | Unknown | Accomplished | |
| 1875 | Hurricane Indianola | Natural disaster | Texas Militia | Unknown | Unknown | Accomplished | |
| 1899 | Laredo Smallpox Riot | Epidemic | Frontier Battalion, Texas Rangers | John H. Rogers | 1 WIA | Accomplished | |
| 1900 | Great Storm | Natural disaster | Texas Militia | Unknown | Unknown | Accomplished | |
| 1947 | Texas City Disaster | Anthropogenic disaster | Texas State Guard | Unknown | 0 | Accomplished | |
| 1954 | Hurricane Alice | Natural disaster | Texas Army National Guard | Unknown | Unknown | Accomplished | |
| 1957 | Hurricane Audrey | Natural disaster | Texas State Guard Texas Army National Guard | Unknown Unknown | Unknown Unknown | Accomplished | |
| 1961 | Hurricane Carla | Natural disaster | Texas State Guard Texas Army National Guard | Unknown Unknown | Unknown Unknown | Accomplished | |
| 1967 | Hurricane Beulah | Natural disaster | Texas State Guard Texas Army National Guard | Unknown Unknown | Unknown Unknown | Accomplished | |
| 1970 | Hurricane Celia | Natural disaster | Texas State Guard Texas Army National Guard | Unknown Unknown | Unknown Unknown | Accomplished | |
| 1980 | Hurricane Allen | Natural disaster | Texas State Guard Texas Army National Guard | Unknown Unknown | Unknown Unknown | Accomplished | |
| 1983 | Hurricane Alicia | Natural disaster | Texas State Guard Texas Army National Guard | Unknown Unknown | Unknown Unknown | Accomplished | |
| 1988 | Hurricane Gilbert | Natural disaster | Texas State Guard Texas Army National Guard | Unknown Unknown | Unknown Unknown | Accomplished | |
| 2003 | Space Shuttle Columbia disaster | Search and rescue | Texas State Guard | Unknown | 0 | Accomplished | |
| 2005 | Hurricane Katrina | Natural disaster | Texas State Guard 254th Combat Communications Group | Unknown Unknown | 0 0 | Accomplished | |
| 2005 | Hurricane Rita | Natural disaster | Texas State Guard 254th Combat Communications Group | Unknown Unknown | 0 0 | Accomplished | |
| 2007 | Eagle Pass Tornado | Natural disaster | Texas State Guard | Unknown | 0 | Accomplished | |
| 2007 | Hurricane Dean | Natural disaster | Texas State Guard | Unknown | 0 | Accomplished | |
| 2007 | Hurricane Humberto | Natural disaster | Texas State Guard | Unknown | 0 | Accomplished | |
| 2007 | Marble Falls Flood | Natural disaster | Texas State Guard | Unknown | 0 | Accomplished | |
| 2008 | Hurricane Ike | Natural disaster | Texas State Guard 254th Combat Communications Group | Unknown Unknown | 0 0 | Accomplished | |
| 2008 | Hurricane Gustav | Natural disaster | Texas State Guard 254th Combat Communications Group | Unknown Unknown | 0 0 | Accomplished | |
| 2008 | Tropical Storm Edouard | Natural disaster | Texas State Guard | Unknown | 0 | Accomplished | |
| 2008 | Hurricane Dolly | Natural disaster | Texas State Guard | Unknown | 0 | Accomplished | |
| 2010 | Hurricane Alex | Natural disaster | Texas State Guard | Unknown | 0 | Accomplished | |
| 2011 | Tropical Storm Lee | Natural disaster | Texas State Guard Texas Army National Guard | Unknown Unknown | 0 | Accomplished | |
| 2011 | Bastrop County Complex Fire | Natural disaster | Texas State Guard | Unknown | 0 | Accomplished | |
| 2013 | West Fertilizer Company explosion | Anthropogenic disaster | Texas State Guard | Unknown | 0 | Accomplished | |
| 2017 | Hurricane Harvey | Natural disaster | Texas State Guard Texas Army National Guard | Unknown Unknown | 0 | Accomplished | |
| 2019 | Tropical Storm Imelda | Natural disaster | Texas State Guard | Unknown | 0 | Accomplished | |
| 2020-2021 | COVID-19 | Pandemic | 72nd INF Brigade Combat Team 56th INF Brigade Combat Team 176th Engineer Brigade Texas State Guard | Unknown Unknown Unknown Unknown | 0 | Accomplished | |
| 2021 | Winter Storm Uri | Natural Disaster | 136th Airlift WingTexas State GuardTexas Army National Guard | Ongoing | 0 | Accomplished | |

==== Expedition ====
| Year | Conflict | Texas Military Unit(s) | Commander | Casualties | Outcome | Reference |
|---|---|---|---|---|---|---|
| 1837 | Yucatan Campaign | Brutus, Texian Navy | James D. Boylan | Unknown | Failure | |
| 1841-1842 | Texan Santa Fe Expedition | Texas Militia | Hugh McCleod / George T. Howard | 320 POW | Failure | |
| 1842 | Somervell Expedition | Texas Militia | Alexander Somervell | Unknown | Inconclusive | |
| 1842 | Mier Expedition / Battle of Mier | Texas Militia | William S. Fisher | 30 KIA, 280 POW | Loss | |
| 1843 | Naval Battle of Campeche | Texas Navy | Edwin Ward Moore | 7 KIA, 24 WIA | Inconclusive | |

==== Guerrilla ====
| Year | Conflict | Texas Military Unit(s) | Commander | Casualties | Outcome | Reference |
|---|---|---|---|---|---|---|
| February 1823 | Skull Creek Massacre | Texian Militia | Robert Kuykendall | 0 | Victory | |
| 1824 | Battle of Jones Creek | Texian Militia | Randal Jones | Unknown | Inconclusive | |
| 1826 | Dressing Point Massacre | Texian Militia | Aylett C. Buckner | 0 | Victory | |
| March 1838 | Córdova Rebellion | Texas Militia | Edward Burleson | Unknown | Victory | |
| August 1838 | Battle of Arroyo Seco | Texas Militia Frontier Battalion, Texas Rangers | Unknown Henry Wax Karnes | 5 KIA, 4 WIA Unknown | Victory | |
| May 1839 | Battle of the San Gabriels | Frontier Battalion, Texas Rangers | James Rice | Unknown | Victory | |
| July 1839 | Battle of the Neches | Texas Army | Thomas J. Rusk | 8 KIA | Victory | |
| March 1840 | Council House Massacre | Texas Militia | Mathew Caldwell | 7 KIA | Atrocity | |
| August 1840 | Great Raid of 1840 | Texas Militia | Mathew Caldwell | 30 KIA | Loss | |
| August 1840 | Battle of Plum Creek | Texas Militia | Mathew Caldwell | 11 KIA | Victory | |
| October 1840 | Battle of Red Fork | Texas Militia | John H. Moore | Unknown | Victory | |
| 1841 | Battle of Bandera Pass | Texas Militia | John C. Hays | 5 WIA | Victory | |
| 1852 | Battle of Hynes Bay | Texas Militia | John Hynes | Unknown | Victory | |
| Jan-May 1858 | Antelope Hills expedition | Frontier Battalion, Texas Rangers Texas Militia | John Salmon Ford Unknown | Unknown 50 KIA / WIA | Victory | |
| May 1858 | Battle of Little Robe Creek | Frontier Battalion, Texas Rangers Texas Militia | John Salmon Ford Unknown | Unknown 2 KIA, 5 WIA | Victory | |
| December 1860 | Battle of Pease River | Frontier Battalion, Texas Rangers Texas Militia | Lawrence Sullivan Ross Unknown | Unknown 3 KIA | Victory | |
| September 1872 | Battle of the North Fork | Frontier Battalion, Texas Rangers | Unknown | Unknown | Victory | |

==== Humanitarian ====
| Year | Conflict | Texas Military Unit(s) | Commander | Casualties | Outcome | Reference |
|---|---|---|---|---|---|---|
| 1899 | Laredo Smallpox Riot | Frontier Battalion, Texas Rangers | J. H. Rogers | 1 WIA | Accomplished | |
| 1998–Present | Operation Lone Star (medical operation unique from 2021 border op) | Texas State Guard Texas Air National Guard Texas Army National Guard | | Ongoing | Ongoing | |
| 2011–Present | Operation Final Rest | Texas State Guard Texas Air National Guard Texas Army National Guard | | Ongoing | Ongoing | |

==== Invasion / Incursion ====
| Year | Conflict | Texas Military Unit(s) | Commander | Casualties | Outcome | Reference |
|---|---|---|---|---|---|---|
| 1842 | Rosillo Expedition | Texas Militia | Unknown | Unknown | Loss | |
| 1842 | Vásquez Expedition | Texas Militia | Unknown | Unknown | Inconclusive | |
| 1842 | Battle of Salado Creek | Texas Militia | Mathew Caldwell | 1 KIA, 12 WIA | Victory | |
| 1842 | Dawson Expedition (massacre) | Texas Militia | Nicholas Dawson | 36 KIA, 15 POW | Loss | |
| 1842 | Battle of the Arroyo Hondo | Texas Militia Frontier Battalion, Texas Rangers | Mathew Caldwell | Unknown Unknown | Victory | |
| 1859-1861 | Cortina War | Frontier Battalion, Texas Rangers Brownsville Tigers, Texas Militia | John Salmon Ford | Unknown 31 KIA, WIA | Victory | |
| 1859 | Battle of La Ebonal | Frontier Battalion, Texas Rangers Brownsville Tigers, Texas Militia | William G. Tobin | Unknown 2 KIA, 5 WIA | Victory | |
| 1859 | Battle of Rio Grande City | Frontier Battalion, Texas Rangers Brownsville Tigers, Texas Militia | John Salmon Ford | Unknown Unknown | Victory | |
| 1862 | First Battle of Sabine Pass | Texas Army | Josephus S. Irvine | 0 | Loss | |
| 1862 | Battle of Nueces (massacre) | 33rd Texas Cavalry, Texas Army | Colin D. McRae | 2 KIA, 18 WIA | Victory/atrocity | |
| 1862 | Battle of Corpus Christi | Texas Militia | Alfred M. Hobby / Charles G. Lovenskiold | 1 KIA, 1 WIA | Victory | |
| 1862 | First Battle of Galveston | 26th Texas Cavalry, Texas Army | Xavier Debray | 0 | Loss | |
| 1863 | Second Battle of Galveston | Texas Army | John B. Magruder | 26 KIA, 117 WIA | Victory | |
| 1863 | Second Battle of Sabine Pass | Davis Guards, 1st Artillery Regiment, Texas Army | Richard W. Dowling | 0 | Victory | |
| 1863 | Battle of Brownsville | 33rd Texas Cavalry, Texas Army | Hamilton P. Bee | 1 KIA, 1 WIA, 1 DIA | Loss | |
| 1863 | Skirmish at La Sal Vieja | 2nd Texas Cavalry, Texas Army | | 0 | Loss | |
| 1864 | Battle of Laredo | 33rd Texas Cavalry, Texas Army | Santos Benavides | 0 | Victory | |
| 1865 | Battle of Palmito Ranch | 2nd Texas Cavalry Regiment, Texas Army | John Salmon Ford | 6 WIA, 3 POW | Victory | |
| 1874 | Penascal Raid | Frontier Battalion, Texas Rangers | John “Red” Dunn | 0 | Victory | |
| 1875 | Nuecestown Raid | Texas Militia | John McClane / Pat Whelen | 1 KIA | Loss | |
| 1878 | Raid of 1878 | Texas Army | Unknown | 0 | Loss | |
| 1915 | Norias Ranch Raid | Company B, Frontier Battalion, Texas Rangers | Monroe Fox | 0 | Inconclusive | |
| January 1918 | Brite Ranch Raid / Porvenir Massacre | Company B, Frontier Battalion, Texas Rangers | Monroe Fox | 0 | Inconclusive | |

==== Revolution ====
| Year | Conflict | Texas Military Unit(s) | Commander | Casualties | Outcome | Reference |
|---|---|---|---|---|---|---|
| 1832 | Battle of Anahuac | Texian Militia | Frank W. Johnson | 1 KIA | Victory | |
| 1832 | Battle of Velasco | Texian Militia | John Austin | 7 KIA, 14 WIA | Victory | |
| 1832 | Battle of Nacogdoches | Texian Militia | James Bowie / James W. Bullock | 4 KIA, 3 WIA | Victory | |
| 1835 | Anahuac Incident | Texian Militia | William B. Travis | 0 | Victory | |
| 1835 | San Felipe Incident | Texian Navy Texas Marines | William A. Hurd Unknown | 0 0 | Victory | |
| 1835-1836 | Runaway Scrape refugee escort | Texian Army | Unknown | Unknown | Victory | |
| 1835 | Battle of Gonzales | Texian Army | John Henry Moore | 0 | Victory | |
| 1835 | Battle of Goliad | Texian Army | James Fannin | 1 WIA | Victory | |
| 1835 | Battle of Concepción | Texian Army | James Bowie | 1 KIA / 1 WIA | Victory | |
| 1835 | Lipantitlán Expedition / Battle of Lipantitlán | Texian Army | Ira Westover | 1 WIA | Victory | |
| 1835 | Grass Fight | Texian Army | James Bowie | 4 WIA, 1 DIA | Victory | |
| 1835 | Siege of Bexar | Texian Army | Stephen F. Austin | 35 KIA / WIA / POW | Victory | |
| 1835-1836 | Matamoros Expedition | Texian Militia | James Grant / Frank W. Johnson | Unknown | Loss | |
| 1836 | Battle of the Alamo | Texian Army | William B. Travis | 257 KIA | Loss | |
| 1836 | Battle of San Patricio | Texian Army | Frank W. Johnson | 16 KIA, 21 POW | Loss | |
| 1836 | Battle of Agua Dulce | Texian Army | James Grant | 15 KIA, 6 POW | Loss | |
| 1836 | Battle of Refugio | Texian Army | William Ward | 31 KIA | Loss | |
| 1836 | Battle of Coleto | Texian Army | James Fannin | 10 KIA, 67 WIA | Loss | |
| 1836 | Goliad Massacre | Texian Army | James Fannin | 445 Executed | Loss | |
| 1836 | Battle of Matamoros | Invincible, Texian Navy Texas Marines | Jeremiah Brown Unknown | 0 0 | Victory | |
| 1836 | Vince's Bridge | Texas Rangers | Deaf Smith | 0 | Victory | |
| 1836 | Battle of San Jacinto | Texian Army | Sam Houston | 11 KIA, 30 WIA | Victory | |

== United States of America government ==
This list includes conflicts under the command authority of the United States of America.

=== Legal Authority ===
Title 10 of the United States Code legally empowers the United States government to mobilize Texas Military Forces when more resources are needed than available in the United States Armed Forces for war, national emergency, or national security. Operations are conducted under command of the United States Department of Defense.

=== Conflicts ===
==== Border control ====
Note: These conflicts are commanded by the American government. For related conflicts commanded by the Texas government, see Border control.

| Year | Conflict | Texas Military Unit(s) | Commander | Casualties | Outcome | Reference |
|---|---|---|---|---|---|---|
| 1954 | Operation Wetback | Texas Army National Guard | Unknown | 0 | Accomplished | |
| 2006-2008 | Operation Jump Start | Texas Air National Guard Texas Army National Guard | Unknown Unknown | 0 0 | Accomplished | |
| 2007 | Operation Stonegarden | Texas Air National Guard Texas Army National Guard | Unknown Unknown | 0 0 | Accomplished | |
| 2010-2016 | Operation Phalanx | Texas Air National Guard Texas Army National Guard | Unknown Unknown | 0 0 | Accomplished | |
| 2018–Present | Operation Faithful Patriot | 72nd Infantry Brigade Combat Team 536th Brigade Support Battalion | Unknown Unknown | Ongoing | Ongoing | |

==== International security ====
| Year | Conflict | Texas Military Unit(s) | Commander | Casualties | Outcome | Reference |
|---|---|---|---|---|---|---|
| 1979-1989 | Air Forces Panama airlift ops(Operation Volant/Coronet Oak) | 136th Airlift Wing | Unknown | Unknown | Victory | |
| 1992-1993 | Operation Southern Watch | 111th Fighter-Bomber Squadron | | | | |
| 2005 | Stabilisation Force in Bosnia and Herzegovina (SFOR) | 36th Infantry Division | Unknown | Unknown | Victory | |
| 2005-2006 | Kosovo Force (KFOR) | 36th Infantry Division | Unknown | Unknown | Victory | |
| 2006–Present | Multinational Force and Observers / Sinai insurgency | 36th Infantry Division | Unknown | Unknown | Ongoing | |
| 2014–Present | European Deterrence Initiative | 254th Combat Communications Group | Unknown | Ongoing | Ongoing | |

==== Mexican War ====
Note: These conflicts are commanded by the American government. For related conflicts commanded by the Texas government, see Invasions / Incursions.

| Year | Conflict | Texas Military Unit(s) | Commander | Casualties | Outcome | Reference |
|---|---|---|---|---|---|---|
| May 1846 | Siege of Fort Texas | 1st Regiment Texas Mounted Rifles | John C. Hays | Unknown | Victory | |
| May 1846 | Battle of Palo Alto | 1st Regiment Texas Mounted Rifles | John C. Hays | Unknown | Victory | |
| May 1846 | Battle of Resaca de la Palma | 7th Rifle Company 1st Regiment Texas Mounted Rifles | William R. Shivor John C. Hays | Unknown Unknown | Victory | |
| September 1846 | Battle of Monterrey | 1st Regiment Texas Mounted Rifles 2nd Regiment Texas Mounted Rifles 1st Regiment Texas Rifles 11th Mounted Company of Spies | John C. Hays George T. Wood Albert Sidney Johnston Benjamin McCulloch | Unknown Unknown Unknown Unknown | Victory | |
| January–July 1847 | Taos Revolt | Texas Militia | | Unknown | Victory | |
| February 1847 | Battle of Buena Vista | 1st Regiment Texas Rifles 2nd Regiment Texas Mounted Rifles 2nd Rifle Company | Albert Sidney Johnston Peter Hansborough Bell Patrick Edward Connor | Unknown Unknown 15 KIA, 2 WIA | Inconclusive | |
| March 1847 | Battle of Veracruz | Frontier Battalion, Texas Rangers | Unknown | Unknown | Victory | |
| April 1847 | Battle of Cerro Gordo | Frontier Battalion, Texas Rangers | Unknown | Unknown | Victory | |
| September 1847 | Battle of Chapultepec | Frontier Battalion, Texas Rangers | Unknown | Unknown | Victory | |
| October 1847 | Battle of Huamantla | Frontier Battalion, Texas Rangers | Samuel Hamilton Walker | Unknown | Victory | |
| November 1847 | Battle of Galaxara Pass | Frontier Battalion, Texas Rangers | Unknown | Unknown | Victory | |
| February 1848 | Battle of Sequalteplan | Frontier Battalion, Texas Rangers | Unknown | Unknown | Victory | |

==== American Civil War ====
| Year | Conflict | Texas Military Unit(s) | Commander | Casualties | Outcome | Reference |
|---|---|---|---|---|---|---|
| 1863 | Second Bayou Teche Campaign | 1st Texas Cavalry Regiment (Union) | Edmund J. Davis | | Loss | |
| 1863 | Battle of Brownsville | 1st Texas Cavalry Regiment (Union) | Edmund J. Davis | | Victory | |

==== Spanish War ====
| Year | Conflict | Texas Military Unit(s) | Commander | Casualties | Outcome | Reference |
|---|---|---|---|---|---|---|
| January 1898 | Battle of Las Guasimas | Troop M, Texas Rangers | Robert H. Bruce | Unknown | Victory | |
| July 1898 | Battle of San Juan Hill | Troop M, Texas Rangers | Robert H. Bruce | Unknown | Victory | |
| July 1898 | Siege of Santiago | Troop M, Texas Rangers | Robert H. Bruce | Unknown | Victory | |

==== Philippine War ====
| Year | Conflict | Texas Military Unit(s) | Commander | Casualties | Outcome | Reference |
|---|---|---|---|---|---|---|
| 1899 | Battle of Magnatarem | 33rd "Texas" Infantry Regiment | Luther Rector Hare | Unknown | Victory | |
| November 1899 | Battle of San Jacinto | 33rd "Texas" Infantry Regiment | Luther Rector Hare | 8 KIA, 13 WIA | Victory | |
| November 1899 | Battle of Vigan | 33rd "Texas" Infantry Regiment | Luther Rector Hare | Unknown | Victory | |
| December 1899 | Battle of Tirad Pass | 33rd "Texas" Infantry Regiment | Luther Rector Hare | Unknown | Victory | |
| December 1899 | Battle of Tangadan (Tagudin) Pass | 33rd "Texas" Infantry Regiment | Luther Rector Hare | Unknown | Victory | |
| 1900 | Abra Occupation | 33rd "Texas" Infantry Regiment | Luther Rector Hare | Unknown | Victory | |
| 1900 | Ilocos Sur Occupation | 33rd "Texas" Infantry Regiment | Luther Rector Hare | Unknown | Victory | |
| September 1900 | Battle of Pulang Lupa rescue operation | 33rd "Texas" Infantry Regiment | Luther Rector Hare | 0 | Victory | |

==== Mexican Border War ====
Note: These conflicts are commanded by the American government. For related conflicts commanded by the Texas government, see Invasions / Incursions.

| Year | Conflict | Texas Military Unit(s) | Commander | Casualties | Outcome | Reference |
|---|---|---|---|---|---|---|
| 1916-1917 | Pancho Villa / Punitive Mexican Expedition | Texas Army National Guard | Unknown | Unknown | Loss | |
| 1918 | Battle of Ambos Nogales | Texas Rangers | Unknown | Unknown | Victory | |

==== World War I ====
| Year | Conflict | Texas Military Unit(s) | Commander | Casualties | Outcome | Reference |
|---|---|---|---|---|---|---|
| September 1918 | Battle of Saint-Mihiel | 90th Infantry Division | Henry Tureman Allen | Unknown | Victory | |
| Sept-Nov 1918 | Battles of the Meuse–Argonne | 36th Infantry Division 90th Infantry Division | William Ruthven Smith Henry Tureman Allen | 2,601 KIA / WIA Unknown | Victory | |

==== World War II ====
| Year | Conflict | Texas Military Unit(s) | Commander | Casualties | Outcome | Reference |
|---|---|---|---|---|---|---|
| September 1943 | Battle of Salerno | 36th Infantry Division | Mark W. Clark | 4,000 KIA / WIA / MIA | Victory | |
| December 1943 | Battle of San Pietro Infine | 36th Infantry Division | Mark W. Clark | 400 KIA, 800 WIA | Victory | |
| January 1944 | Battle of Rapido River | 141st Infantry Regiment 143rd Infantry Regiment 36th Infantry Division | Fred L. Walker | 141 KIA, 663 WIA, 875 POW / MIA | Loss | |
| Jan-Feb 1944 | Battle of Monte Cassino | 142nd Infantry Regiment | Fred L. Walker | | Victory | |
| May–June 1944 | Operation Diadem | 36th Infantry Division | Lucian Truscott | | Victory | |
| Aug-Sept 1944 | Operation Dragoon | 36th Infantry Division | John E. Dahlquist | | Victory | |
| October 1944 | Lost Battalion Europe | 141st Infantry Regiment 36th Infantry Division | John E. Dahlquist | 64 KIA / WIA / MIA / POW 161 KIA, 2,000 WIA, 43 MIA | Victory | |
| April 1945 | Liberated Dachau concentration camp | 36th Infantry Division | Lucian Truscott | | Victory | |
| May 1945 | Battle for Castle Itter | 142nd Infantry Regiment | | | Victory | |
| May 1945 | Capture of Gerd von Rundstedt | 36th Infantry Division | | | Victory | |

==== Cold War ====
| Year | Conflict | Texas Military Unit(s) | Commander | Casualties | Outcome | Reference |
|---|---|---|---|---|---|---|
| 1950-1952 | Korea air campaign | 1808 Engineer Aviation Company 108th Radar Calibration Detachment 136th Aircraft Control and Warning Squadron 134th Aircraft Control Squadron 158th Aircraft Control and Warning Group 136th Fighter-Bomber Wing 111th Fighter-Bomber Squadron 182d Fighter-Bomber Squadron | Unknown Unknown Unknown Unknown Unknown Unknown Unknown Unknown | Unknown Unknown Unknown Unknown Unknown Unknown Unknown 2 KIA | Victory | |
| 1961-1962 | Cuban Missile Crisis | 36th Infantry Division | Unknown | 0 | Victory | |
| 1962 | Exercise Iron Dragoon | 49th Armored Division | Harley B. West | 0 | Victory | |
| 1976-1993 | Exercise Team Spirit | 136th Airlift Wing | Unknown | Unknown | Victory | |
| 1983 | Operation Urgent Fury | 136th Airlift Wing | Unknown | Unknown | Victory | |
| 1988 | Exercise Reforger | 136th Airlift Wing | Unknown | Unknown | Victory | |

==== War on drugs ====
Note: These conflicts are commanded by the American government. For related conflicts commanded by the Texas government, see Counterdrug.

| Year | Conflict | Texas Military Unit(s) | Commander | Casualties | Outcome | Reference |
|---|---|---|---|---|---|---|
| 1989 | Operation Just Cause | 181st Airlift Squadron | Unknown | 0 | Victory | |
| 1992 | Operation Plus Up | 143rd Infantry Regiment | Unknown | Unknown | Unknown | |
| 2002 | Operation Nighthawk | 143rd Infantry Regiment | Unknown | Unknown | Unknown | |
| 2002 | Operation Tri-star | 143rd Infantry Regiment | Unknown | Unknown | Unknown | |
| 2002 | Operation Unity | 143rd Infantry Regiment | Unknown | Unknown | Unknown | |
| 2006-2008 | Operation Jump Start | Texas Air National Guard Texas Army National Guard | Unknown Unknown | 0 0 | Victory | |
| 2007 | Operation Stonegarden | Texas Air National Guard Texas Army National Guard | Unknown Unknown | 0 0 | Victory | |
| 2010-2016 | Operation Phalanx | Texas Air National Guard Texas Army National Guard | Unknown Unknown | 0 0 | Victory | |
| 2018–Present | Operation Faithful Patriot | 72nd Infantry Brigade Combat Team 536th Brigade Support Battalion | Unknown Unknown | Ongoing | Ongoing | |

==== Gulf War ====
| Year | Conflict | Texas Military Unit(s) | Commander | Casualties | Outcome | Reference |
|---|---|---|---|---|---|---|
| 1990-1991 | Operation Desert Shield | 36th Infantry Division | | | | |
| 1991 | Operation Desert Storm | 36th Infantry Division | | | | |
| 1991 | Gulf War air campaign | 181st Airlift Squadron 111th Fighter-Bomber Squadron 147th Attack Wing | | | | |
| 1991 | Operation Volant Pine | 181st Airlift Squadron | | | | |

==== War on terror ====
| Year | Conflict | Texas Military Unit(s) | Commander | Casualties | Outcome | Reference |
|---|---|---|---|---|---|---|
| 2001–Present | Operation Noble Eagle | 181st Airlift Squadron | | | | |
| 2004-2014 | Operation Enduring Freedom | 181st Airlift Squadron 36th Infantry Division | | | | |
| 2004-2011 | Operation Iraqi Freedom | 181st Airlift Squadron 111th Fighter-Bomber Squadron 147th Attack Wing 36th Infantry Division | | | | |
| 2008 | Operation New Horizons | 181st Airlift Squadron | | | | |
| 2010-2011 | Operation New Dawn | 36th Infantry Division | | | | |
| 2014–Present | Operation Inherent Resolve | 36th Infantry Division | | | | |
| 2015 | Operation Flintlock | 5th Battalion, 19th Special Forces Group | | | | |
| 2015–2021 | Operation Freedom's Sentinel | 36th Infantry Division | | | | |

== United Mexican States government ==
This list includes conflicts under the command authority of the United Mexican States (First Mexican Republic) government.

=== Legal Authority ===
Faculty 18 and 19, Section 5, Title 3 of the 1824 Constitution of Mexico legally empowered the First Mexican Republic government to mobilize Texas Military Forces. Operations were conducted under command of the Mexican Army.

=== Conflicts ===
| Year | Conflict | Texas Military Unit(s) | Commander | Casualties | Outcome | Reference |
|---|---|---|---|---|---|---|
| 1827 | Fredonian Rebellion | Texian Militia | Stephen F. Austin | None | Victory | |

== Confederate States of America government ==
This list includes conflicts under the command authority of the Confederate States of America.

=== Legal Authority ===
The First, Second, and Third Conscription Acts of the 1st Confederate States Congress legally empowered the Confederate States government to mobilize Texas Military Forces. Operations were conducted under command of the Confederate States War Department.

=== Conflicts ===
==== American Civil War ====
Note: These conflicts are commanded by the Confederate government. For related conflicts commanded by the Texas government, see Invasions / Incursions.

| Year | Conflict | Texas Military Unit(s) | Commander | Casualties | Outcome | Reference |
|---|---|---|---|---|---|---|
| November 1861 | Battle of Round Mountain | 9th Texas Cavalry Regiment | William B. Sims | | Victory | |
| December 1861 | Battle of Chusto-Talasah | 9th Texas Cavalry Regiment | William B. Sims | | Victory | |
| December 1861 | Battle of Chustenahlah | 32nd Texas Cavalry Regiment | Julius A. Andrews | | Victory | |
| February 1862 | Battle of Fort Donelson | 7th Texas Infantry Regiment | John Gregg | | Loss | |
| April 1862 | Battle of Shiloh | 8th Texas Cavalry Regiment (Terry's Texas Rangers) | Benjamin Franklin Terry | | Loss | |
| March 1862 | Battle of Pea Ridge | 9th Texas Cavalry Regiment | William B. Sims | | Loss | |
| April–May 1862 | Siege of Corinth | 9th Texas Cavalry Regiment | William B. Sims | | Loss | |
| May 1862 | Battle of Eltham's Landing | Texas Brigade | John Bell Hood | | Inconclusive | |
| May 1862 | Battle of Seven Pines | Texas Brigade | John Bell Hood | | Inconclusive | |
| June 1862 | Battle of Gaines' Mill | Texas Brigade | John Bell Hood | | Victory | |
| June–July 1862 | Seven Days Battles | 1st Texas Infantry Regiment | Phillip A. Work | | Victory | |
| August 1862 | First Battle of Rappahannock Station | 1st Texas Infantry Regiment | Phillip A. Work | | Inconclusive | |
| August 1862 | Battle of Second Manassas | Texas Brigade | John Bell Hood | | Victory | |
| August 1862 | Battle of Richmond | 32nd Texas Cavalry Regiment | Julius A. Andrews | | Victory | |
| September 1862 | Battle of Antietam | Texas Brigade | William T. Wofford | | Inconclusive | |
| September 1862 | Battle of South Mountain | 1st Texas Infantry Regiment | Phillip A. Work | | Loss | |
| October 1862 | Battle of Perryville | 8th Texas Cavalry Regiment (Terry's Texas Rangers) | Benjamin Franklin Terry | | Loss | |
| October 1862 | Second Battle of Corinth | 2nd Texas Infantry Regiment | Ashbel Smith | | Loss | |
| October 1862 | Battle of Hatchie's Bridge | 2nd Texas Infantry Regiment | Ashbel Smith | | Loss | |
| December 1862 | Battle of Fredericksburg | Texas Brigade | Jerome B. Robertson | | Victory | |
| Dec 1862-Jan 1863 | Battle of Stones River/Murfreesboro | 8th Texas Cavalry Regiment (Terry's Texas Rangers) | Benjamin Franklin Terry | | Loss | |
| January 1863 | Battle of Arkansas Post | 6th Texas Infantry Regiment | Robert R. Garland | | Loss | |
| January 1863 | Battle of Galveston | 20th Texas Infantry Regiment | Henry M. Elmore | | Victory | |
| April 1863 | Battle of Snyder's Bluff | 2nd Texas Infantry Regiment | Ashbel Smith | | Victory | |
| April–May 1863 | Siege of Suffolk | 1st Texas Infantry Regiment | Phillip A. Work | | Inconclusive | |
| May 1863 | Battle of Raymond | 7th Texas Infantry Regiment | Hiram B. Granbury | | Loss | |
| May 1863 | Battle of Jackson | 7th Texas Infantry Regiment | Hiram B. Granbury | | Loss | |
| May–July 1863 | Siege of Vicksburg | 2nd Texas Infantry Regiment | Ashbel Smith | | Loss | |
| June 1863 | Battle of Milliken's Bend | 3rd Brigade, Walker's Infantry Division | Henry Eustace McCulloch | 185 KIA / WIA | Loss | |
| June 1863 | Battle of Young's Point | 1st Brigade, Walker's Infantry Division | James Morrison Hawes | Unknown | Loss | |
| July 1863 | Battle of Gettysburg | Texas Brigade | Jerome B. Robertson | | Loss | |
| September 1863 | Battle of Chickamauga | Texas Brigade | Jerome B. Robertson | | Victory | |
| September 1863 | Battle of Stirling's Plantation | 5th Texas Cavalry Regiment | Arthur P. Bagby Jr | | Victory | |
| October 1863 | Battle of Wauhatchie | 1st Texas Infantry Regiment | Phillip A. Work | | Loss | |
| November 1863 | Battle of Bayou Bourbeux | 5th Texas Cavalry Regiment | Arthur P. Bagby Jr | | Victory | |
| November 1863 | Battle of Missionary Ridge | 6th Texas Infantry Regiment | Robert R. Garland | | Loss | |
| November 1863 | Battle of Ringgold Gap | 7th Texas Infantry Regiment | Hiram B. Granbury | | Victory | |
| April 1864 | Battle of Mansfield | Walker's Infantry Division; Mouton's Infantry Division; 5th Texas Cavalry Regiment; 26th Texas Cavalry Regiment | John George Walker; Alfred Mouton; Thomas Green; Xavier Debray | 1,000 KIA / WIA | Victory | |
| April 1864 | Battle of Pleasant Hill | Walker's Infantry Division; Bee's Cavalry Division; 5th Texas Cavalry Regiment; 26th Texas Cavalry Regiment | John George Walker; Hamilton P. Bee / James Patrick Major; Thomas Green / Arthur P. Bagby Jr; Xavier Debray | | Victory | |
| April 1864 | Battle of Fort Pillow | 8th Texas Cavalry Regiment (Terry's Texas Rangers) | Benjamin Franklin Terry | | Victory | |
| April 1864 | Battle of Jenkins' Ferry | Walker's Infantry Division | John George Walker | | Pyrrhic Loss | |
| May 1864 | Battle of the Wilderness | Texas Brigade | John Gregg | | Inconclusive | |
| May 1864 | Battle of Spotsylvania Court House | 1st Texas Infantry Regiment | Phillip A. Work | | Loss | |
| May 1864 | Battle of North Anna | 1st Texas Infantry Regiment | Phillip A. Work | | Loss | |
| May–June 1864 | Battle of Cold Harbor | Texas Brigade | John Gregg | | Inconclusive | |
| June 1864-Apr 1865 | Siege of Petersburg | 1st Texas Infantry Regiment | Phillip A. Work | | Loss | |
| October 1864 | Battle of Allatoona | 9th Texas Infantry Regiment | William Hugh Young | | Loss | |
| November 1864 | Battle of Franklin | Granbury's Brigade | Hiram B. Granbury | | Loss | |
| December 1864 | Battle of Nashville | Granbury's Brigade | Hiram B. Granbury | | Loss | |
| December 1864 | Third Battle of Murfreesboro | 9th Texas Cavalry Regiment | William B. Sims | | Loss | |
| March 1865 | Battle of Bentonville | 8th Texas Cavalry Regiment (Terry's Texas Rangers) | Benjamin Franklin Terry | | Loss | |
| March 1865 | Battle of Averasborough | Granbury's Brigade | Hiram B. Granbury | | Inconclusive | |
| March-Apr 1865 | Battle of Spanish Fort | 9th Texas Infantry Regiment | | | Loss | |
| March-Apr 1865 | Appomattox campaign | 1st Texas Infantry Regiment | Phillip A. Work | | Loss | |
| April 1865 | Battle of Fort Blakeley | 9th Texas Infantry Regiment | Miles A. Dillard | | Loss | |

== See also ==
- Texas Military Forces
- Texas Military Department
- Awards and decorations of the Texas Military
