= Texas Marines =

Former branch of the Republic of Texas Military (1836–1844)

Texas Marines Marine Corps of the Republic of Texas
- Texas Marines Seal
- Active: 14 Jan 1836—24 Feb 1844
- Country: Republic of Texas
- Allegiance: Consultation of the Republic of Texas; Constitution of the Republic of Texas
- Type: Marines
- Role: Amphibious warfare Desert warfare Force protection Law enforcement Naval boarding Raiding; Reconnaissance; Screening; Skirmisher; Tracking
- Size: 350
- Part of: Texas Military Department: Texas Military Forces
- Engagements: Texas Revolution: Battle of Brazoria; Interdiction of Sisal; Battle of Matamoros; General Service: Battle of the Brazos River; Battle of Galveston Harbor; Yucatan campaign: Battle of Campeche

Commanders
- Notable commanders: Fenton Mercer Gibson; Arthur Robertson; Thomas Crosby

The Texas Marines, officially the Marine Corps of the Republic of Texas, were the marines of the Texas Navy tasked with amphibious warfare, enforcing discipline aboard ships, naval boarding, providing security at naval base or shore stations, raiding, reconnaissance, screening, and shooting long range targets with a musket or rifle by sharpshooter. It was officially established on January 14, 1836 and modeled after the United States Marines Corps.

== History ==
The Republic of Texas Marine Corps, also known as Texas Navy Marine or Marine Corps of the Republic of Texas, was a branch of the Texas Navy, based heavily on the United States Marine Corps of the time. The branch was only suggested under the Act and Decree Establishing a Navy, which was passed on 25 November 1835. Nonetheless, after Governor James W. Robinson wrote to the General Council, urging for the formal establishment of a Marine Corps on 14 January 1836, did the commissioning and recruiting of officers and enlisted men begin. However, the Marines were lacking in numbers, with over 350 enlists and 18 officers in the Corps before the Texas annexation into the United States.

Every vessel of the Texas Navy had a dedicated Marine Guard composed of several marines and a commander. These guards were responsible for maintaining appropriate behavior among seamen on their respective vessels; and for ensuring the protection of their vessels when docked. However, Marines were also sharpshooters and boarders during engagements, with the sole duty of securing the enemy vessel's deck and then moving in to secure other areas of the ship. A worthy representation of this would be with the guard aboard the Liberty vessel, which swiftly boarded and secured the Mexican Pelicano on 3 March 1836.

Despite being a well-respected branch during the second phase of the Texas-Mexican conflict, the reputation of the Marine Corps deteriorated when, on 11 February 1842, the guard aboard the San Antonio mutinied along with some of the crew, killing Lieutenant Charles Fuller, the only person killed during the mutiny. The mutiny on the San Antonio was the only one in the branch's history.

On 29 December 1845, President of the United States James Polk signed a joint resolution, which admitted Texas as the twenty-eighth state of the Union, as of that resolution, the Texas Navy and Marine Corps ceased to exist.

== Horse Marines ==
The Horse Marines were a volunteer Texas Ranger group formed in 1836. They were led by Major Isaac Watts Burton and ordered by General Thomas J. Rusk to patrol the Texas coast between the mouth of the Guadalupe and Mission Bay for defense against retaliatory raids and expeditions by Mexico following the Battle of San Jacinto.

== See also ==
- Texas Military Forces
- Texas Military Department
- List of conflicts involving the Texas Military
- Awards and decorations of the Texas Military
