= Texas Militia =

State militia forces for Texas, part of U.S. Armed Forces

- Active: September 5, 1836–present
- Country: United States, State of Texas
- Allegiance: Republic of Texas, 1836–1846; State of Texas, 1846–present United States, 1846–present
- Type: Militia
- Role: Land warfare, Aerial warfare, Naval warfare, Civil affairs
- Size: 23,200 (2017)
- Part of: Texas Military Department: Texas Military Forces; United States Department of Defense: United States National Guard
- Engagements: List of conflicts involving the Texas Military

Commanders
- Notable commanders: Thomas J. Rusk; Felix Huston; Sidney Sherman; John B. Jones; Wilburn Hill King; John Augustus Hulen; Henry Hutchings; Daniel James III; John F. Nichols

The Texas Militia are the militia forces of the State of Texas. It currently consists of the Texas Army National Guard, Texas Air National Guard, and Texas State Guard. It is administered by the Texas Military Department under command of the Texas Adjutant General. Since 1846, the Texas Militia constitutes the entirety of the Texas Military Forces.

== History ==
The Texas Militia descends from the Texian Militia established by Stephen F. Austin in 1823 to protect the Old Three Hundred in the Colony of Texas. Its most notable unit, the Texas Rangers, remained in continuous service of Texas Military Forces until 1935. Following the Texas Revolution, the Republic of Texas authorized the Texas Militia, Texas Army, and Texas Navy in the Constitution on September 5, 1836.

On December 6, 1836, the First Congress officially established the militia declaring "Every free able bodied male citizen of this republic, resident therein, who is or shall be...seventeen...and under the age of fifty years shall...be enrolled in the militia." However, no funds were appropriated. In 1837, the Second Congress passed the Militia Act of 1837 with appropriations, which established one division composed of four brigades. It was initially led by Thomas Rusk, who was replaced by Felix Huston in 1839, and Sidney Sherman in 1840.

On March 9, 1838, the Milam Guards were established by Joseph Daniels in Houston, the first new militia unit of the Republic of Texas (after the Texas Rangers). It was followed by the Travis Guards (Rifles) on March 1, 1840, and Galveston Artillery on September 13, 1840.

The Texas Army and Navy were merged with the United States Armed Forces on February 19, 1846, after the Republic of Texas became the 28th state of America, leaving the Texas Militia (including the Texas Rangers) as the only authorized force under the United States Militia Acts of 1792.

After annexation, the First Texas Legislature passed the Militia Act of 1846, which established five divisions each composed of two brigades. During the Frontier / Antebellum period, notable units included the Texas Rangers, Alamo Rifles of San Antonio, the Galveston Artillery Company, the Lone Star Military Company of Galveston, the Washington Light Guards of Houston, the Milam Rifles of Houston, the Turner Rifles of Houston, and the Refugio Riflemen.

During the American Civil War, the Texas Militia was generally designated the Home Guard or State Troops and tasked with defense of the frontier against Indian and Mexican incursion, defense of the coast against Union invasion, and suppression of Union loyalists. The Texas Militia was initially disbanded during reconstruction / military occupation, but reestablished as the Texas Volunteer Guard and Texas State Police in 1871.

Following the Militia Act of 1903, the Texas Militia was divided into separate forces:

1. The Texas Army National Guard and Texas Air National Guard, subject to Title 32 and Title 10 of the United States Code which legally empowers the United States government to mobilize them when more resources are needed than available in the United States Armed Forces for war, national emergency, or national security.
2. The Texas State Guard, only subject to Title 32 of the United States Code which legally empowers individual states to maintain military forces.

Since 1903, the Texas National Guard designation has remained the same while the Texas State Guard has been designated as the:

- Texas Reserve Militia, 1905-1913
- Texas Home Guard, 1914-1918 (World War I)
- Texas Reserve Militia, 1919-1940
- Texas Defense/State Guard, 1941-45 (World War II)
- Texas State Guard Reserve Corps, 1945-1965
- Texas State Guard, 1965–present

== Authority ==
=== Republic of Texas ===
From 1836 to 1845, the Texas Militia was legally empowered by Article II, Section 6 of the Constitution of the Republic of Texas "to execute the law, to suppress insurrections, and repel invasion." It was administered by the War Department under command of the Secretary of War, Texas Adjutant General, and President of Texas.

=== State of Texas ===
From 1846 to 1903, the Texas Militia was legally empowered by the United States Militia Acts of 1792, and Article 6 of the Constitution of the State of Texas "to execute the laws of the State, to suppress insurrections, and to repel invasions."

From 1903 to present, following the Militia Act of 1903, the Texas Militia is legally empowered by Title 32 of the United States Code and Article 4, Section 7 of the Constitution of the State of Texas to "execute the laws of the state, to suppress insurrections, and to repel invasions". Operations are conducted under command of the Texas Military Department by the Texas Adjutant General.

From 1903 to present, some Texas Militia units are also subject to Title 10 of the United States Code, which legally empowers the United States government to mobilize them when more resources are needed than available in the United States Armed Forces for war, national emergency, or national security. Operations are conducted under command of the United States Department of Defense by the Secretary of Defense.

== Units ==
The Texas Militia has undergone many redesignations and reorganizations since 1836.

=== Current units ===
- Texas Army National Guard
- Texas Air National Guard
- Texas State Guard

=== Former units ===
- Texas Militia, 1836-1845 (Republic era)
  - Texas Rangers
  - Milam Guards
  - Travis Guard (Rifles)
  - Galveston Artillery
- Texas Militia, 1845-1861 (Frontier era)
  - Frontier Battalion (Texas Rangers)
  - Alamo Rifles
  - Galveston Artillery Company
  - Lone Star Military Company
  - Washington Light Guards
  - Milam Rifles
  - Turner Rifles
  - Refugio Riflemen
- Texas Home Guard/State Troops, 1861-65 (American Civil War)
  - San Jacinto Guards
  - Davis Guards
  - Turner Rifles
- Texas Volunteer Guard, 1871-1904 (Reconstruction era)
  - Houston Light Guards
  - Smith County Guards
  - Star Riflemen
  - Waco Greys
  - Kerrville Mounted Rifles
  - San Marcos Greys
  - Gonzales Rifles
  - Fannin Light Guards
  - Lamar Rifles
  - Stonewall Greys
  - Austin Greys
  - Comanche Guards
  - Lavaca Greys
  - Alamo Rifles
  - Palestine Rifles
- Texas Reserve Militia, 1905-1913
- Texas Home Guard, 1914-1918 (World War I)
- Texas Reserve Militia, 1919-1940
  - Royal Irish Regiment
- Texas Defense/State Guard, 1941-45 (World War II)
  - 1st Training and Research Unit
  - 2nd Training and Research Unit
  - First Naval Battalion
  - Air Corps
- Texas State Guard Reserve Corps, 1945-1965

== See also ==
- Texas Military Forces
- Texas Military Department
- List of conflicts involving the Texas Military
- Awards and decorations of the Texas Military
