= San Felipe incident =

San Felipe incident may refer to:

- San Felipe incident (1596), a Spanish ship wrecked in Japan
- San Felipe incident (1835), a naval battle between Texas and Mexico
