= Texas Military Department =

Department of the Texas state government

Agency overview
- Formed: 5 August 1836; 190 years ago (as War Department)
- Preceding agencies: War Department (1836-1846); Department of Texas (1850-1913); Adjutant General Department (1913-2015)
- Jurisdiction: Texas government
- Headquarters: Building Eight Camp Mabry, Austin, Texas 30°18′42.173″N 97°45′38.338″W
- Motto: Texans Serving Texas
- Employees: 4,300 (federal); 550 (state); 23,200 (service members)
- Annual budget: $101.1 million, FY2017 (58% federal) (0.006% of TX GDP)
- Agency executive: Adjutant General of Texas
- Parent department: Office of The Governor of Texas
- Child agencies: Texas Military Forces; Texas Challenge Academy
- Website: tmd.texas.gov

The Texas Military Department (TMD) is an executive branch agency of the Texas government. Along with the Texas Department of Public Safety, it is charged with providing the security of Texas, which has the second-largest population, border, and economy in the United States. It also provides administration of the Texas Military Forces (TXMF), the principal instrument through which it executes security policy. TXMF currently include the Texas Army National Guard, Texas Air National Guard, and Texas State Guard. It formerly included the Texas Rangers, Texas Army, Texas Navy, and Texas Marines.

The Texas Military Department also maintains a variety of civic engagement initiatives to support public relations, accountability, transparency, and safety awareness. It hosts an annual open house and toy drive. It also hosts the Texas ChalleNGe Academy, Texas STARBASE, Project 1836, and Texas Military Forces Museum. It also publishes The Dispatch magazine, TMDTV, smartphone applications, and social-media channels.

The Texas Military Department (TMD) is commanded by the adjutant general of Texas, who is appointed by and reports to the governor of Texas. Headquartered at Building Eight in Camp Mabry, TMD's stated mission is to "provide the governor and President with ready forces in support of state and federal authorities at home and abroad." It is empowered by Article 4, Section 7 of the Texas Constitution to "execute the laws of the State, to suppress insurrections, and to repel invasions."

== History ==
The TMD was established as the War Department of the Republic of Texas on August 5, 1836. It was empowered by Article II of the Constitution of the Republic of Texas and initially comprised the Office of the Adjutant General, Texas militia, Texas Army, Texas Navy, and Texas Rangers. In the years between the Texas Revolution and Mexican War as a sovereign republic, the department remained active in land, sea, and guerilla combat operations and expeditions. Most notably, the Battle of Salado Creek, Naval Battle of Campeche, Texas-Indian Wars, and Texan Santa Fe Expedition.

When Texas joined the United States, the Texas Army and Navy were integrated into the United States Armed Forces. The War Department was redesignated the Department of Texas and consisted of the Office of the Adjutant General, Texas militia, and Texas Rangers. The department was abolished from February 4, 1856 - April 6, 1860 due to a fire on October 10, 1855 that destroyed nearly all records.

During the Civil War, most of the department's service members fought under command of the Confederate States War Department (Texas Confederate units). Some service members fought under command of the United States War Department (Texas Union units). However, the Department of Texas maintained provincial "Home Guard" forces for defense of the state. They are credited with leaving Texas the only Confederate state unconquered by the Union Army following three failed efforts, including the Second Battle of Sabine Pass, which is also among the most notable victories of the Civil War. They are also credited with the final battle and victory of the Civil War at the Battle of Palmito Ranch.

The department was again abolished from January 1, 1867 to June 24, 1870 during the military occupation and reconstruction of Texas. After Texas was readmitted to the United States on March 30, 1870, the department was reestablished and empowered by the Constitution of Texas to fight unrest and restore order. It comprised the Office of the Adjutant General, Texas militia, and Texas State Police (Texas Rangers). Following the Militia Act of 1903, the Texas militia became the Texas National Guard. During World War I, the Department of Texas was re-designated the Adjutant General Department and again maintained provincial "Home Guard" forces for defense of the state, while the Texas National Guard was under federal command. By 1935, the Texas Rangers had evolved from a paramilitary force to a police force and were reorganized under the Texas Department of Public Safety. During World War II, the United States Congress amended the National Defense Act of 1916 permanently authorizing the "Home Guard" defense forces as the Texas State Guard. The Adjutant General Department was colloquially referred to as the "Texas Military" from 2006 to 2015. On October 28, 2015 the Adjutant General Department was officially rebranded as the Texas Military Department.

The Texas Military Department has not waged a combat operation since the 19th century, but its units have participated in the Mexican War, Spanish War, Philippine War, Mexican Expedition, World War I, World War II, Cold War, and War on Terror under command of the United States Department of Defense.

Throughout the 20th and 21st centuries, the Texas Military Department has been primarily engaged in military operations other than war, including manmade- and natural-disaster operations, search-and-rescue operations, counterdrug operations, and border-security operations. Most notable are the Mexican drug war, Texas City Disaster, Hurricane Harvey, Hurricane Katrina, Hurricane Rita, Bastrop County Complex Fire, Operation Jump Start, Operation Phalanx, Operation Faithful Patriot, Operation Strong Safety, Operation Border Star, Operation Drawbridge, and Operation River Watch.

== Authority ==
The Texas Military Department exists under civilian control. It is empowered by Article 4, Section 7 of the Texas Constitution to "execute the laws of the State, to suppress insurrections, and to repel invasions" and Texas Government Code Title 4, Subtitle C, Chapters 431, 433, and 437. It is governed by the Texas Code of Military Justice and commanded by the Commander-in-Chief of Texas and Adjutant General of Texas.

== Administration ==
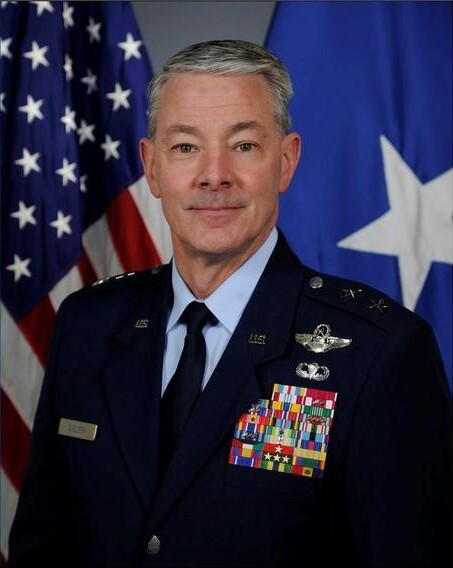
Major General Thomas M. Suelzer, 53rd Adjutant General of Texas

Texas Military Department organizational chart, April 2018

The Texas Military Department is required by law to maintain duplicate federal and state offices for many administrative functions such as human resources, finance, and payroll. TMD divides these traditional agency functions between federal administrative offices under the adjutant general's chief of staff and a state executive director.

=== Office of the Adjutant General ===
The Adjutant General (TAG) of Texas is the commander and chief executive officer of the Texas Military Department. The adjutant general's position of authority over Texas Military Forces is second only to the commander-in-chief, the Governor of Texas. This position is analogous to the United States Secretary of Defense. The Adjutant General of Texas is appointed by the Governor of Texas with the advice and consent of the Texas Senate from Texas Government Code Title 4, Subtitle C, Chapter 437.003.

The Constitution of Texas] vests all military authority in the commander-in-chief, an elected position, to maintain civilian control of the military. Because it is impractical for the governor of Texas to operate the entire government, the authority is delegated via commission to the adjutant general. The adjutant general, secretary of state, attorney general, and comptroller are generally regarded as the most important executive positions in the government of Texas.

The Office of the Adjutant General (OAG) is the general and his/her deputy's (mainly) civilian staff.

OAG is the principal staff element of the Adjutant General in the exercise of policy development, planning, resource management, fiscal and program evaluation and oversight, and interface and exchange with other Texas Government departments and agencies, foreign governments, and international organizations, through formal and informal processes. OAG also performs oversight and management of Texas Military Forces.

=== Office of the Executive Director ===
The Executive Director is the civilian officer responsible for state administration, such as state payroll, state purchasing, and state human resources. These functions impact almost all of TMD's operations as many routine purchases supporting military operations use state funds, as does payroll for state active duty missions. The executive director oversees 45 state employees carrying out these state support functions, as well as coordinates with the 505 other state employees and approximately 4,300 federal personnel working in other programs and reporting through different chains of command. Despite the implications of the title, the executive director reports to the adjutant general, who ultimately maintains responsibility for all department activities and decisions. Overall, the executive director generally functions as the voice for state administrative concerns within the department's larger military organization.

=== Joint staff ===
The joint staff coordinates operations using the Texas Military Forces and advises on common functions such as readiness, planning, and logistics.

=== Domestic Operations Command ===
The Domestic Operations Command, commonly referred to as DOMOPS, is a unified command of the Texas Military Department established in 2011 to improve response time, maximize equipment and personnel capabilities, place various critical domestic operations programs on a sustainable footing, and maximize use of public taxes for the Texas Military Forces. It consists of the TMD Joint Staff, Joint Task Force 136th Maneuver Enhancement Brigade (MEB), 176th Engineer Brigade, Joint Counter Drug Task Force, and Southwest Border Task Force.

== Awards and decorations ==
Awards and decorations of the Texas Military are the medals, ribbons, badges, tabs, trophies, plaques, certificates, memorials, and monuments that recognize service and achievement while serving in the Texas Military Forces.

== Capability ==
=== Forces ===
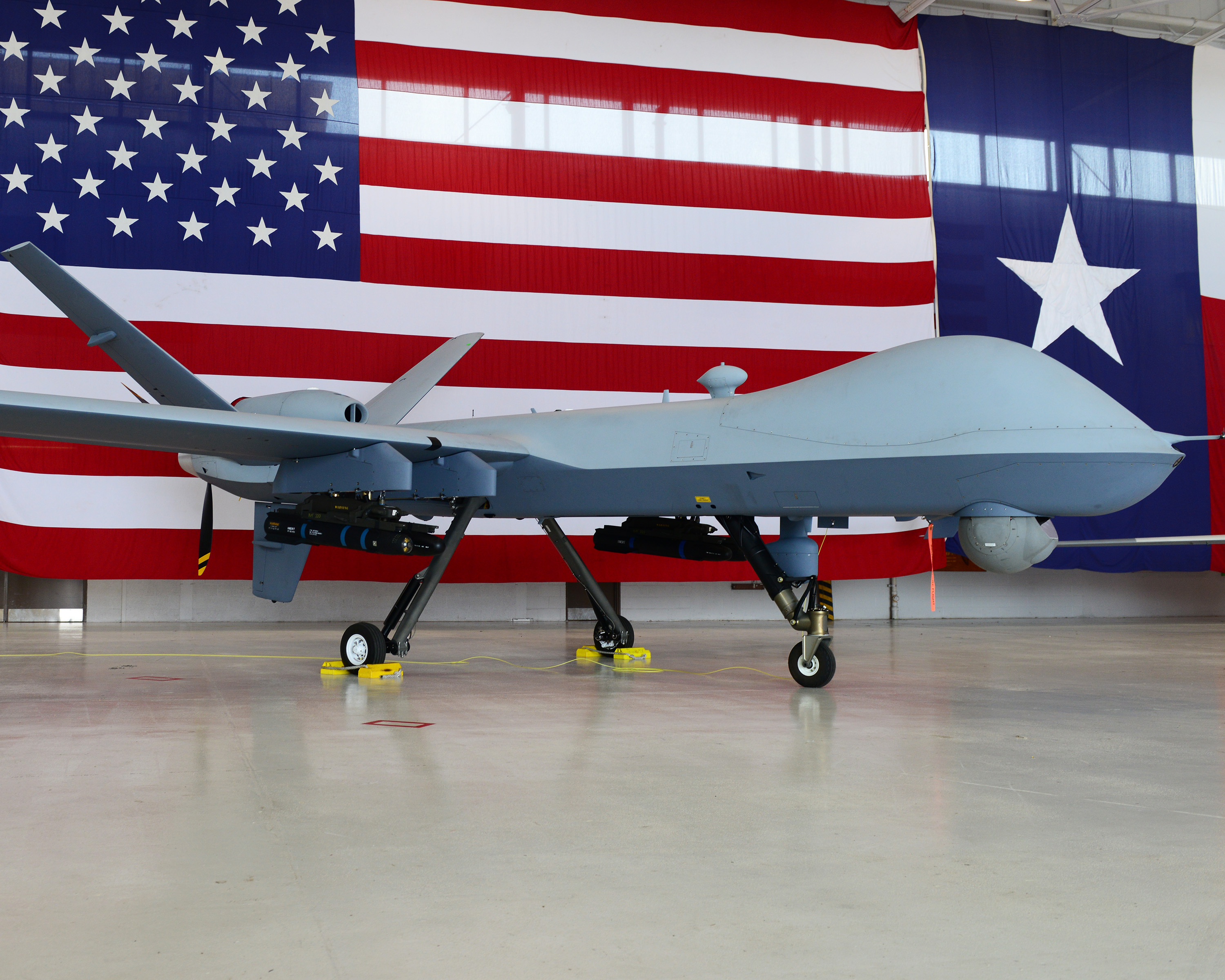
MQ-9 Reaper - 147th Attack Wing

They include infantry, paratroopers, special forces, armored cavalry, field artillery, communication, cyber, intelligence, support, medical, engineering, civil affairs, and weapon of mass destruction response units totalling over 23,000 service members. It also maintains a fleet of manned and unmanned aircraft with strike and reconnaissance capabilities, a fleet of rotorcraft, and a fleet of brown-water watercraft. It maintains a statewide network of garrison, training, and monitoring installations. It maintains command and control through shelter and mobile tactical operations centers.

=== Education ===
The Texas Military Department operates two independent and comprehensive professional military education systems divided between National Guard and State Guard forces. The latter includes basic training through officer candidate school and staff college.

== Civic engagement ==
=== Media ===
==== Application ====
The Texas Military Department developed and maintains an eponymous software application for smartphone operating systems iOS, Android, and Windows. The app offers a variety of tools and provides realtime press releases, news, and safety alerts.

==== The Dispatch ====
In August 1943, the Texas State Guard Officers’ Association launched a monthly magazine called The Texas Guardsman. It was later known as The Guardsman, then The State Guardsman (a national publication), and today as The Dispatch. The Dispatch is a digital magazine published monthly on the Texas Military Department's website.

==== Public reports ====
The Texas Military Department makes a variety of reports available to the public through the Texas Military Department's website. They include select military operation after-action reviews, annual and biennial reports and audits, legislative appropriation, sunset reports, select strategic plans, and the "Mission Ready Package Catalog", which outlines its capabilities.

==== TMDTV ====
The Texas Military Department provides an inside look at the Texas Military Forces missions, training, and capabilities through video content published on Roku and Amazon Fire TV.

=== Open House ===
The Texas Military Department Open House, also known as "American Heroes Weekend", is a free, annual event hosted at Camp Mabry in conjunction with the American Heroes Air Show. It enables citizens to learn about TMD's missions and capabilities and interact with Texas Military Forces service members. The event includes helicopter demonstrations, emergency and first responder displays, World War II reenactments, children's activities, and a career fair. It attracts approximately 20,000 guests each year.

=== Texas ChalleNGe Academy ===
The Texas Challenge Academy (styled ChalleNGe) is the Texas affiliate of the Youth Challenge Program operated by the Texas National Guard.

It operates a free, 5 1/2-month residential and 12-month post-residential education program for at-risk 16- to 18-year-old students. The program is designed to help students who are "disengaged, at-risk of dropping out, or have already dropped out of high school and is available to qualified students without regard to race, sex, religious affiliation, or household income."

The program is set in a military environment, complete with uniforms, rank, bearing, and instructors to "help cadets develop personal accountability and earn high school credit recovery, general education development, or a high school diploma." The Texas Challenge Academy is an accredited high school through Rice Consolidated Independent School District.

The Texas Challenge Academy is a volunteer program. There is no military obligation for students, nor is it considered a juvenile detention center, court-ordered boot camp, or drug/alcohol treatment center. It has no affiliation with the Texas Juvenile Justice Department.

=== Texas STARBASE Austin ===
Commanding General MG Gerald R. Betty and soldiers, Young Heroes Toy Drive, 2015

The Texas STARBASE Austin is the Texas affiliate of the United States Department of Defense STARBASE program.

It provides 5th grade students with free instruction in science, technology, engineering, and math (STEM), in addition to aviation and aerospace. The curriculum consists of rigorous activities, interactive investigations, experiments, simulations, and on-site tours demonstrating use of STEM in the workplace. Classroom instruction includes Newton's laws of motion, Bernoulli's principle, navigation and mapping, flight simulation, investigations of nanotechnology and nanoengineering, atmospheric properties, rocketry, engineering design process, computer-aided design (CAD), and 3D manufacturing. Students explore STEM careers, processes for goal setting and teamwork skills, the importance of staying in school, and remaining a life-long learner. Certified educators teach the curriculum with the assistance of Texas Military Forces service members and community volunteers with technical and content expertise. All curriculum content and student activities are correlated to state and national science, technology, and math standards.

It can host up to 64 students per class. The instruction is typically delivered in five-hour blocks, once a week, for five consecutive weeks.

=== Young Heroes Toy Drive ===
The Young Heroes Toy Drive, also known as "Young Heroes of the Guard", is an annual toy drive operated by the Texas State Guard for the Christmas and holiday season. Since 2009, it has collected and distributed nearly 250,000 toys to Texas children.

=== Project 1836 ===
Project 1836 is an initiative by the Texas Military Department that highlights and celebrates service in the Texas Military Forces.

== Installations ==
Texas Military Department HQ, Building Eight, Camp Mabry

- 65 armories
- Camp Bowie
- Camp Bullis
- Camp Mabry ☆
- Camp Maxey
- Camp Stanley
- Camp Swift
- Ellington Field Joint Reserve Base
- Fort Wolters

== Lawsuits ==
The following civil cases involved the Texas Military Department or its components. They include cases involving its predecessor, the Texas Adjutant General's Department. Dates refer to the original court filings where available. A date introduced by "by" or "before" indicates the case was filed by that point. Federal removals, transfers, and appeals are listed with their underlying cases.

| Filing date | Case | Court and case number | Subject and disposition |
|---|---|---|---|
| June 2, 2026 | John Gately v. Thomas M. Suelzer et al. | W.D. Tex., 1:26-cv-01480 | Gately alleged that his termination over off-duty political speech violated the First Amendment. The defendants included the Texas adjutant general in his official capacity. |
| By August 8, 2025 (federal docket) | Aaron Q. Dees v. State of Texas et al. | W.D. Tex., 1:25-cv-01241 Fifth Circuit, 25-50925 | Texas removed the case from state court. Dees alleged retaliation involving the Texas Military Department and Texas State Guard. The Fifth Circuit affirmed dismissal in July 2026. |
| June 6, 2025 | Emmanuel Gonzalez v. Texas Military Department | 389th District Court, Hidalgo County, C-2769-25-H; Texas Thirteenth Court of Appeals, 13-26-00281-CV | Negligence suit over a collision involving a Texas Army National Guard member on Operation Lone Star orders. The appellate court affirmed the dismissal of the claims against the department in October 2026. |
| June 2, 2025 | Blayne D. Williams, Sr. v. Texas Military Department et al. | 335th District Court, Bastrop County, 3044-335 | The public register lists a civil petition against the department and two individuals. |
| April 29, 2025 | Aaron Quinn Dees v. State of Texas et al. | W.D. Tex., 1:25-cv-00633 | Federal civil-rights suit naming Texas, the Texas Military Department and the Texas State Guard. The district court closed the case and denied reopening. |
| April 24, 2025 | Kindra Hart v. Texas Military Department | W.D. Tex., 1:25-cv-00613 | Employment-discrimination suit. In April 2026, the court denied the department's motion to dismiss and stay the case. |
| October 4, 2024 | Juan Antonio Lopez et al. v. Texas Military Department | 107th District Court, Cameron County, 2024-DCL-05876; Texas Thirteenth Court of Appeals, 13-25-00150-CV; Supreme Court of Texas, 26-0094 | Personal-injury suit arising from a collision involving a Texas Air National Guard member assigned to Operation Lone Star. The appellate court dismissed the claims against the department, and the Texas Supreme Court denied review. |
| October 1, 2024 | Norma Uresti-Marin v. Texas Military Department | 139th District Court, Hidalgo County, C-4576-24-C; Texas Thirteenth Court of Appeals, 13-25-00476-CV | Motor-vehicle negligence suit. Uresti-Marin pursued claims against the department in an amended petition. The appellate court ordered dismissal for lack of jurisdiction in June 2026. |
| February 26, 2024 | San Juanita Medeles v. Jeanette Jimmerson et al. | 459th District Court, Travis County, D-1-GN-24-000896; Texas Third Court of Appeals, 03-24-00588-CV and 03-25-00360-CV; Texas Fifteenth Court of Appeals, 15-25-00119-CV | Challenge to a Texas State Guard discharge. In December 2025, the Fifteenth Court of Appeals upheld the trial court's refusal to dismiss the remaining ultra vires claims as moot. |
| January 20, 2024 | Tina Ann Neville v. Thomas M. Suelzer et al. | D.D.C., 1:24-cv-00175 | Freedom of Information Act suit seeking Texas Air National Guard records concerning the handling of an employment discrimination complaint. |
| January 5, 2024 | Rogerio Estrada, Jr. and Marta Gonzalez Estrada v. Texas Military Department and State of Texas | 381st District Court, Starr County, DC-24-9; Texas Fourth Court of Appeals, 04-25-00299-CV | Personal-injury suit over a collision involving a Texas Army National Guard member on Operation Lone Star duty. The appellate court dismissed the claims against the department in August 2025. |
| By December 8, 2023 | Nicole R. Pena et al. v. Texas Military Department and State of Texas | 229th District Court, Starr County, DC-23-240; Texas Fourth Court of Appeals, 04-23-01104-CV; Texas Fifth Court of Appeals, 05-24-00074-CV | The docketing statement describes a personal-injury suit. The Fifth Court of Appeals dismissed the appeal in February 2024 after the parties reported a settlement. |
| July 7, 2023 | Epi's Canoe & Kayak Team, LLC and Jessie F. Fuentes v. State of Texas et al. | 98th District Court, Travis County, D-1-GN-23-003613; W.D. Tex., 1:23-cv-00836 | The plaintiffs sought to halt the installation of floating barriers in the Rio Grande under Operation Lone Star. The Texas Military Department and Texas National Guard were among the defendants. The federal court remanded the case to state court in August 2023. |
| June 8, 2023 | American Oversight v. Florida Army National Guard et al. | D.D.C., 1:23-cv-01662 | Freedom of Information Act suit naming the Texas Army National Guard as a defendant. It sought records concerning reported white supremacist and other extremist activity among Guard personnel. The court dismissed the case in July 2025 after the parties filed a joint stipulation. |
| June 1, 2023 | Bruce Feltner v. Texas Military Department | 455th District Court, Travis County, D-1-GN-23-002961; Texas Third Court of Appeals, 03-23-00653-CV | Dispute over the return of World War I memorabilia held by the Texas Military Forces Museum. The appellate court affirmed the dismissal of the museum director from the case in October 2025. |
| March 31, 2023 | State Farm Mutual Automobile Insurance Co. v. Anthony R. Alvarez and Texas Military Department | Justice Court, Precinct 3, Travis County, J3-CV-23-000618 | The register classifies the case as a motor-vehicle accident small claim. |
| June 10, 2021 | Tyesha Natalie Isom v. Texas State Guard et al. | N.D. Tex., 3:21-cv-01351 | Civil-rights suit naming the Texas State Guard and other defendants. In January 2022, the district court ordered dismissal for failure to prosecute or comply with court orders. |
| October 30, 2019 | William Henry Starrett, Jr. v. U.S. Department of Defense et al. | N.D. Tex., 3:19-cv-02579 | Federal civil action naming the Texas Military Department among several defendants. |
| April 24, 2019 | William Henry Starrett, Jr. v. Department of Defense et al. | N.D. Tex., 3:19-cv-00988 Fifth Circuit, 19-10969 | Federal civil action naming the Texas Military Department. The Fifth Circuit dismissed the appeal for want of prosecution in November 2019. |
| December 12, 2018 | Enedelia Cruz v. Texas Department of Public Safety (later Texas State Guard) | 92nd District Court, Hidalgo County, C-4571-18-A; Texas Thirteenth Court of Appeals, 13-22-00575-CV | Motor-vehicle collision suit. Cruz added the Texas State Guard as a defendant on February 27, 2020. The appellate court ordered dismissal for lack of jurisdiction in December 2023. |
| October 25, 2018 | William Henry Starrett, Jr. v. U.S. Department of Defense et al. | N.D. Tex., 3:18-cv-02851 Fifth Circuit, 18-11628 | Federal civil action naming the Texas Military Department. The Fifth Circuit affirmed dismissal in April 2019. |
| August 22, 2017 | Sandra Flowers v. Texas Military Department | S.D. Tex., 4:17-cv-02704 | Employment-discrimination suit. The court refiled the complaint under a different docket number on September 5, 2017. |
| May 19, 2017 | Cynthia Millonzi v. Adjutant General's Department of Texas et al. | W.D. Tex., 1:17-cv-00488 | Employment-related civil-rights suit naming the Adjutant General's Department and other defendants. |
| April 7, 2017 | William Henry Starrett, Jr. v. Lockheed Martin Corporation et al. | N.D. Tex., 3:17-cv-00988 | Federal civil action naming the Texas Military Department among several defendants. |
| July 1, 2015 | Tina Neville v. Jenny Yang et al. | D.D.C., 1:15-cv-01032 W.D. Tex., 5:16-cv-01231 Fifth Circuit, 18-50438 | Mandamus proceeding seeking action on an employment discrimination ruling involving the Texas Air National Guard. After a 2016 transfer, the case proceeded as Neville v. Lipnic et al. The Fifth Circuit affirmed dismissal in 2019. |
| January 9, 2012 | Janet Stratton v. Texas Air National Guard et al. | W.D. Tex., 1:12-cv-00024 | Suit naming the Texas Air National Guard and other defendants. The district court dismissed it without prejudice for lack of jurisdiction in June 2012. |
| 2008 | Michele Ngakoue v. Franklin Barnum and Texas Adjutant General's Office | County Court at Law No. 2, Travis County, C-1-CV-08-010645; Texas Third Court of Appeals, 03-09-00087-CV; Supreme Court of Texas, 11-0686 | Motor-vehicle negligence suit. Ngakoue added the Adjutant General's Office by amendment. In 2013, the Texas Supreme Court held that the claim against the agency could proceed. |
| November 2005 | Graylon L. Walch v. Adjutant General's Department of Texas et al. | S.D. Tex. Fifth Circuit, 07-20175 | Walch challenged his discharge from the Texas Air National Guard and the loss of his civilian Guard job. The Fifth Circuit affirmed dismissal in 2008. |
| By 2001 | Harvey Gough v. State of Texas, Adjutant General's Department et al. | 126th District Court, Travis County, GN0-00421; Texas Third Court of Appeals, 03-01-00358-CV | Challenge to an involuntary discharge from the Texas Army National Guard. The appellate court affirmed dismissal in 2002. |
| 1998 | Robert L. Drake v. 136th Airlift Wing et al. Robert L. Drake v. HQ Texas Air National Guard et al. | N.D. Tex., 3:98-cv-01673, 3:98-cv-01674 and 3:98-cv-01675 Fifth Circuit, 99-10599 | Three consolidated suits alleged discrimination, retaliation and Privacy Act violations. The Fifth Circuit affirmed dismissal in 2000. |
| December 1997 | Linda Irene Meister v. Texas Adjutant General's Department and Daniel James III | Fifth Circuit, 99-50935 (233 F.3d 332) | Employment-discrimination suit against the department and the adjutant general in his official capacity. In 2000, the Fifth Circuit affirmed dismissal of one claim and remanded two others for further consideration. |
| October 16, 1996 | Charles E. Amos v. Texas Adjutant General's Department and Daniel James III | 98th District Court, Travis County, 96-12476; Texas Third Court of Appeals, 03-00-00634-CV | Challenge to an efficiency board proceeding that led to Amos's discharge from the Texas Air National Guard. The appellate court vacated the trial judgment and dismissed the case in 2001. |
| 1993 | Frederick A. Newth v. Adjutant General's Department of Texas and Executive Department of the State of Texas | 126th District Court, Travis County, 93-04792; Texas Third Court of Appeals, 03-93-00516-CV | Texas Whistleblower Act suit concerning Guard personnel decisions. The appellate court affirmed dismissal without prejudice in 1994. |
| Before June 13, 1983 | Richard M. Crawford v. Texas Army National Guard et al. Bruce A. Olson v. Texas Army National Guard et al. | Fifth Circuit, 794 F.2d 1034 | Two suits alleged retaliation for reporting misconduct and racial discrimination in the Guard. The Fifth Circuit affirmed the dismissals with a modification in 1986. |

== See also ==
- List of conflicts involving the Texas Military
