= Army of the Republic of Texas =

- Texas Army Seal
- Active: 5 Sept 1836–19 Feb 1846
- Country: Republic of Texas
- Allegiance: Constitution of the Republic of Texas
- Type: Army
- Role: Land warfare
- Size: 5,000–7,000
- Part of: Texas Military Department: Texas Military Forces
- Engagements: List of conflicts involving the Texas Military

Commanders
- Notable commanders: Sam Houston; Thomas Jefferson Rusk; Felix Huston; Albert Sidney Johnston

The Texas Army, officially the Army of the Republic of Texas, was the land force branch of the Texas Military Forces during the era of the Republic of Texas. It descended from the Texian Army, which was established in October 1835 to fight for independence from the Centralist Republic of Mexico during the Texas Revolution. While the Texian Army was provisionally formed by the Consultation in November 1835, it did not replace the volunteer Texian Army until after the Battle of San Jacinto. The Texas Army, Texas Navy, and Texas Militia were formally established on September 5, 1836, in Article II of the Constitution of the Republic of Texas. Following annexation, The Texas Army and Texas Navy were officially merged into the United States Armed Forces on February 19, 1846, when the Republic of Texas formally transferred power to the State of Texas as the 28th state of the United States of America.

== History ==
The regular division of the Army of the Republic of Texas was officially established by the provisional government on December 12, 1835, evolving out of the wartime volunteer Texian Army. To incentivize recruitment, the General Council offered any man who enlisted in the regular army a $24 cash bounty, instant Texian citizenship, and the rights to 800 acres of land (later increased to 1,280 acres for those serving for the duration of the war). Members of the Volunteer Auxiliary Corps and Militia were promised 640 acres for two years of service, or 320 acres for one year. Less than a week later, on December 18, the Council further expanded the military framework by authorizing the creation of a Legion of Cavalry which would be put under the command of William B. Travis.

Major General Sam Houston, appointed commander of the regular forces, called for 5,000 men to enlist but faced immediate frustration. Most volunteers arriving from the United States fiercely resisted strict military discipline and institutional control. Instead of joining the regular army, they flocked to independent volunteer units forming across Texas. These foreign volunteers were often far more radical and eager for combat than the actual Texas colonists, many of whom still hoped for a peaceful political settlement. While the provisional government was still bitterly debating whether they were fighting for total independence or merely separate Mexican statehood under the Constitution of 1824, the Texian garrison at Goliad forced the issue. On December 20, 1835, they unanimously issued the Goliad Declaration of Independence, proclaiming "that the former province and department of Texas is, and of right ought to be, a free, sovereign and independent state."

The provisional government's command structure quickly fractured into chaotic infighting. Although Houston was ostensibly in chief command, the General Council bypassed him in late December, issuing secret orders to James Fannin, Frank W. Johnson, and Dr. James Grant to bypass the executive branch and prepare an expeditionary force to invade Mexico. Houston was sidelined and ordered to East Texas to negotiate a neutrality treaty with the Cherokee. Seizing the opportunity, Johnson and Grant stripped the garrison at San Antonio de Béxar, taking 300 of its 400 defenders and the bulk of its supplies to prepare for their planned southern campaign.

This left the remaining garrison at Béxar in a desperate plight, completely destitute of funds and supplies. On January 6, 1836, Lieutenant Colonel James C. Neill, left in command of the remaining 100 ill and poorly equipped troops, wrote a scathing letter to the Council: "If there has ever been a dollar here I have no knowledge of it. The clothing sent here by the aid and patriotic exertions of the honorable Council, was taken from us by arbitrary measures of Johnson and Grant, taken from men who endured all the hardships of winter and who were not even sufficiently clad for summer, many of them having but one blanket and one shirt, and what was intended for them given away to men some of whom had not been in the army more than four days, and many not exceeding two weeks."

For the next several months, the Texas military suffered from a total paralysis of leadership, with no clear consensus on who held supreme authority—Fannin, Johnson, Grant, or Houston. Exploiting this vacuum, Johnson issued a formal proclamation on January 10 calling for the creation of a "Federal Volunteer Army of Texas" to launch the ill-fated Matamoros Expedition.

== Uniforms, weapons, and equipment ==
During the Republic era, the Army of Texas employed a varied array of meticulously crafted uniforms, integrating elements from both infantry and cavalry traditions. Rank was indicated through distinct insignia and specific detailing, as substantiated by historical research and illustrative documentation.

The infantry possessed a variety of small arms, including Bowie knife, Army's standard smoothbore musket, captured Mexican weapons, U.S. Model 1836 flintlock pistol, Tower Land Pattern Pistol, and the Colt model Paterson/Walker.

The M1833 military sword was adopted for use by Texan dragoon cavalrymen. It had similar patterns to the Western European light cavalry saber of 1822. During the late Republic period, the "Old Wristbreaker" saber was possibly utilized before Texas was admitted in U.S.A.

In 1839, President Mirabeau B. Lamar of the Republic of Texas authorized the acquisition of 1,500 flintlock muskets from the Tryon Company of Philadelphia to equip the professional army. These muskets, commonly known as the Tryon Texas contract muskets, were highly esteemed for their superior quality, which civilian inspector George Flegal deemed comparable to U.S. military armaments. Due to logistical and possibly epidemic-related issues, only 860 muskets were delivered and paid for by 1840. Some of these muskets played significant roles in military operations, such as 321 that were issued to Texas troops for the 1841 Santa Fe Expedition. Texas encountered financial difficulties during its formative years, which constrained its capacity to procure essential weaponry. A procurement order for 1,600 firearms from a New Orleans-based manufacturer was only partially satisfied, with 800 units delivered due to inadequate funding.

The M1840 artillery short sword was supplied to the Republic of Texas by the Ames Manufacturing Company, serving as a regulation light artillery saber for mounted troops and part of the standard issue for Texas artillery units. Notable artillery companies included Captain Chamberlain's Company, 1st Regiment of Texas Artillery, under the command of Colonel Neil, which saw active service in late 1836. Additionally, various artillery companies were assigned to the commands of Colonel Edward Burleson and Colonel William G. Cooke, with artillery detachments stationed at frontier outposts such as Gonzales, Austin, Mission San Jose, and San Antonio between 1839 and 1841.

The Colt Paterson Second Model No. 2 Ring Lever rifle played a notable role in early Texas history, with approximately 100 rifles purchased by the Republic of Texas in 1839. Purchase an additional 180 Model 1839 carbines.

== Organization ==
The organizational blueprint for the first regular army was officially drafted by the Consultation in November 1835, drawing heavily from the structure of the United States Army. The Consultation decreed that the military would be led by a major general serving as commander-in-chief, who held supreme command over both the regular army and the volunteer forces. To manage operations, this commander was empowered to appoint a staff consisting of an adjutant general, a quartermaster general, a paymaster general, a surgeon general, and four aides-de-camp. On November 12, 1835, representatives of the Consultation elected Sam Houston as the inaugural commander-in-chief, though many of the subordinate officer positions were elected directly by the political delegates themselves.

On paper, the unit structure of the regular army was divided into two primary regiments: one of infantry and one of artillery. Each regiment was designed to comprise two battalions, with each battalion containing five companies. A separate, specialized Corps of Rangers was established as an independent battalion consisting of three companies to patrol the frontier. While the army's initial November framework completely omitted a cavalry component, the General Council corrected this a month later in December by authorizing the "Legion of Cavalry." This legion was structured into two squadrons of three companies each. To support these regular forces, the government relied on local volunteer militias (popularly known as the "Army of the People") and established a Volunteer Auxiliary Corps to serve as a formal military reserve force.

While much of this organizational layout remained identical on paper, the ratification of the Constitution of the Republic of Texas in September 1836 fundamentally altered the army’s ultimate chain of command. Under the new constitution, the President of the Republic of Texas was designated as the official commander-in-chief of the military forces. However, a strict check on executive power was implemented: the president was legally barred from exercising field command or leading troops in person without the explicit prior authorization of the Texas Congress.

== Personnel ==
Rank structure in the Army of the Republic of Texas was largely based on that of the United States Army.

=== Commissioned officer ranks ===
The rank insignia of commissioned officers.

| Rank group | General / flag officers | | Senior officers | | | Junior officers |
|---|---|---|---|---|---|---|---|---|
| Insignia |
| Infantry insignia |
| | Major general | Brigadier general | Colonel | Lieutenant colonel | Major | Captain | First lieutenant | Second lieutenant |

=== Other ranks ===
The rank insignia of non-commissioned officers and enlisted personnel.

| Rank group | NCOs | | | Enlisted |
|---|---|---|---|---|---|---|
| Infantry |
| Artillery |
| Cavalry |
| | Staff sergeant | First sergeant | Sergeant | Corporal | Lance corporal | Private |

=== Commanders ===
Until September 1836, the top commanding officer in the field held the absolute title of "commander-in-chief." Following the ratification of the Constitution of 1836, supreme constitutional command of the military was assumed by the President of the Republic of Texas, who oversaw the senior generals operating in the field.

==== Commander-in-chief ====
- Sam Houston (1835–1836, 1836–38, 1841–44)
- David G. Burnet (1836)
- Thomas Jefferson Rusk (1836)
- Mirabeau B. Lamar (1836, 1838–41)
- Anson Jones (1844–46)

==== Secretary of War (and Marine) ====
- Thomas Jefferson Rusk (1836)
- Mirabeau B. Lamar (1836)
- Alexander Somervell (1836)
- John A. Wharton (1836)
- William S. Fisher (1836–37)
- Barnard E. Bee Sr. (1837-1838)
- Albert Sidney Johnston (1838-1840)
- Branch T. Archer (1840-1841)
- George Washington Hockley (1841–42)
- George Washington Hill (1842–44)
- Morgan C. Hamilton (1844)
- William Gordon Cooke (1844–46)

==== Commanding officer of the Army of the Republic of Texas ====
- Brigadier General Thomas Jefferson Rusk (1836)
- Brigadier General Felix Huston (1836-1837)
- Brigadier General Albert Sidney Johnston (1837-1838)
- Colonel Edward Burleson (1838-1841)

== See also ==
- Texas Military Forces
- Texas Military Department
- 141st Infantry Regiment (United States)
- List of conflicts involving the Texas Military
- Awards and decorations of the Texas Military
