= 26th Texas Cavalry Regiment =

Confederate States Army military unit

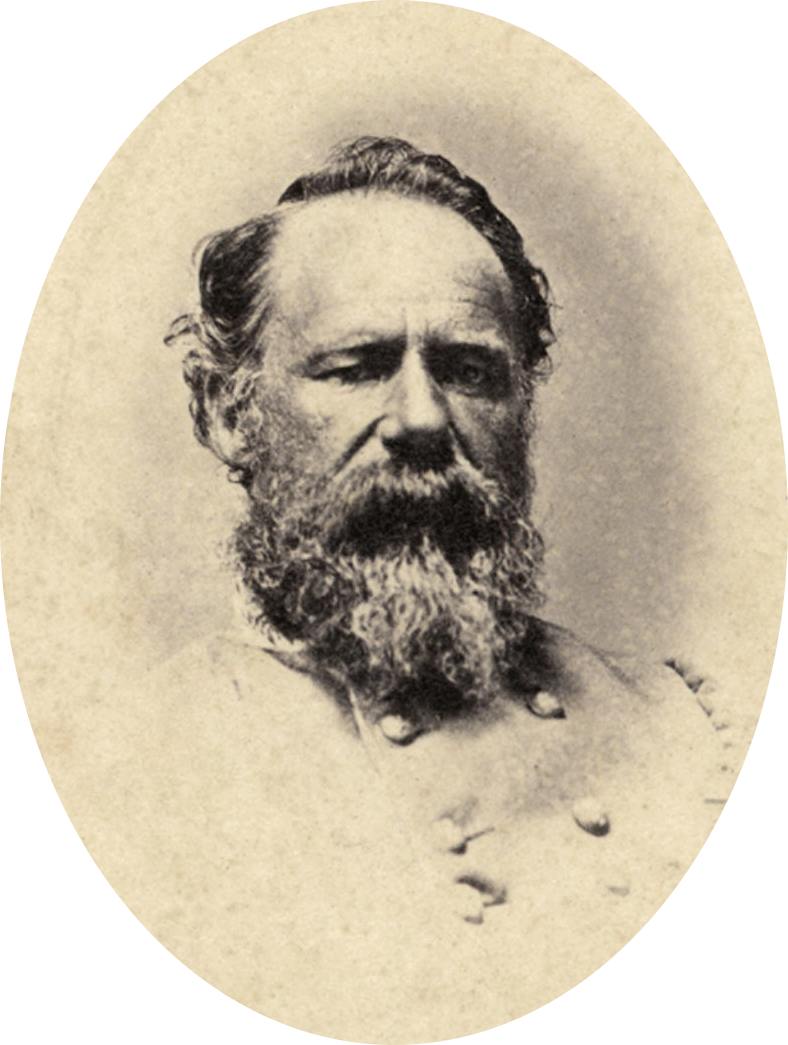
- Xavier Debray became the regiment's colonel.
- Active: August 1861 – June 1865
- Country: Confederate States of America
- Allegiance: Confederate States of America, Texas
- Branch: Confederate States Army
- Type: Cavalry
- Size: Regiment
- Nickname: Debray's Mounted Riflemen
- Engagements: American Civil War; Battle of Mansfield (1864); Battle of Pleasant Hill (1864)

Commanders
- Notable commanders: Xavier Debray

The 26th Texas Cavalry Regiment was a unit of mounted volunteers from Texas that fought in the Confederate States Army during the American Civil War. The unit first organized in August 1861 as the 7th Texas Cavalry Battalion with seven companies for the purpose of patrolling the Texas Gulf Coast. In January 1862, three companies were added, and the unit was renamed the 26th Texas Cavalry Regiment. The original colonel resigned and was replaced by Xavier Debray, a Frenchman educated at Saint-Cyr military academy. Constant drilling gave the unit its reputation as one of the best disciplined in Texas. Until 1864, the regiment only fought minor skirmishes with Union landing parties. That year it fought at Mansfield and Pleasant Hill in the Red River Campaign. Instead of disbanding in May 1865, the regiment stayed intact and briefly guarded the city of Houston against marauders.

== See also ==
- List of Texas Civil War Confederate units
