= Battle of Walker's Creek =

Part of the Texas-Indian Wars

- Part of Texas-Indian Wars
Date	June 8, 1844
Location	Kendall County, Texas
Result	Texas Ranger victory

Belligerents
Republic of Texas; Texas Rangers	Comanche

Commanders and leaders
John Coffee Hays	Unknown

Strength
20	75

Casualties and losses
1 killed	20-30 killed

The Battle of Walker's Creek was a battle fought on June 8, 1844, between a company of Texas Rangers led by Captain John Coffee Hays and a band of Comanche warriors near Walker's Creek in present-day Kendall County, Texas. The conflict was one of the many skirmishes and battles during the Texas-Indian Wars.

The battle became one of the most celebrated battles involving the Texas Rangers, as well as a key moment that cemented the lethality of repeating firearms in frontier warfare. The event inspired the creation of the firearm Colt Walker.

== Background ==
During the 1840s, a war was fought between the budding Republic of Texas and the Comanche Nation, which was the latest war fought by the Comanche against Anglo-American and Hispanic settlers. Decades before the conflict, the Comanche waged war against the Mexican Government, which in turn forced the latter to entice Anglo-Americans to settle in Texas and create a buffer state. When the Anglo-Americans won a revolt against Mexico, thus forming the Republic of Texas, the new country now came face-to-face with the Comanche.

At that time, a paramilitary and peace-keeping unit known as the Texas Rangers, were tasked to fight the Comanche and protect Texas citizens. One of the leaders of the Texas Rangers who came into prominence was Jack Coffee Hays. He made an alliance with another Indian tribe at war with the Comanche, the Lipan Apache, who were led by Chief Flacco. During his tenure as Texas Rangers, he became known to his men for his bold and often reckless style of combat.

== Battle ==
The confrontation occurred on June 8, 1844, near Walker's Creek, a tributary of the Guadalupe River. While trailing a group of Comanche, Hays and his men came upon a warband of 75 warriors, camped on higher ground. Instead of charging uphill, the Rangers circled around the Comanche position before climbing up through an unseen position. The Rangers' sudden charge surprised the Comanche, but their numerical superiority still forced the Rangers to retreat. The Comanches regrouped and pursued the Rangers for two miles.

The chase ended when the Rangers decided to occupy a tree grove, taking positions behind the wood. As the Comanches charged, the Rangers fired back. At that time, Hays’ men were equipped with a surplus of new Colt Paterson revolver, which they received from the Texas Navy. The repeating firearm allowed each Ranger to fire five shots without reloading, providing a significant tactical advantage. As the Comanches came in, the Rangers unleashed their revolvers and delivered multiple volleys, disrupting their attack and turning the tide of the battle. A few of the Comanche managed to break through, incurring casualties on the Rangers, but the ferocity of the revolvers still proved too much.

The Comanche halted their charge but positioned themselves nearby to check the Rangers' escape. Hays then decided to break the stalemate by sallying forth to the Comanche's position on horseback. A long-range rifle shot from Texas Ranger Robert Gillespie managed to kill a Comanche chief, finally forcing the war party to retreat.

== Aftermath ==
Despite being outnumbered, the Rangers inflicted heavy casualties. Around 20 to 30 Comanche warriors were killed, while the Rangers suffered only one fatality and a few wounded. The battle marked the importance of the use of revolvers and other repeating rifles against fast-moving Native Americans. One of Hay's men, Samuel Hamilton Walker, later refined the design of the firearm, leading to the Colt Walker.

== In other media ==
The battle was featured in an episode on John Coffee Hays for the television series entitled Into the Wild Frontier.
