= Texas Code of Military Justice =

The Texas Code of Military Justice (TCMJ) is the foundation of military law in the State of Texas for the Texas Military. It was established by the Texas Legislature in accordance with the authority given by the Constitution of Texas.

== Current subchapters ==
The TCMJ is found in Title 4, Subtitle C, Chapter 432 of the Texas Government Code.

Subchapter	Title	Section
A	General Provisions	001—005
B	Apprehension And Restraint; Nonjudicial Punishment	008—015
D	Courts-Martial	031—036
E	Composition Of Courts-Martial	041—048
F	Pretrial Procedure	051—056
G	Trial Procedure	061—079
H	Sentences	091—115
J	Punitive Articles	121—167
K	Miscellaneous Provisions	181—195

== See also ==
- Uniform Code of Military Justice
- Judge Advocate General's Corps
- Military law
- Military tribunal
- Military courtesy
- Laws of war
- War crime
