= Tequilero =

Tequilero de Primera is a certification bestowed upon someone who has completed an approved seminar on tequila and is therefore authorized to promote tequila from Mexico. Seminars and eventual certification can be obtained from the Western Mexican state of Jalisco.

The term "tequilero" also refers to Mexicans, who helped to smuggle alcohol into the United States during the Era of Prohibition from 1920 to 1933, a time when the United States outlawed the sale, manufacture, and transportation of non-religious alcohol.
