= Hiram B. Granbury =

Confederate Army general (1831–1864)

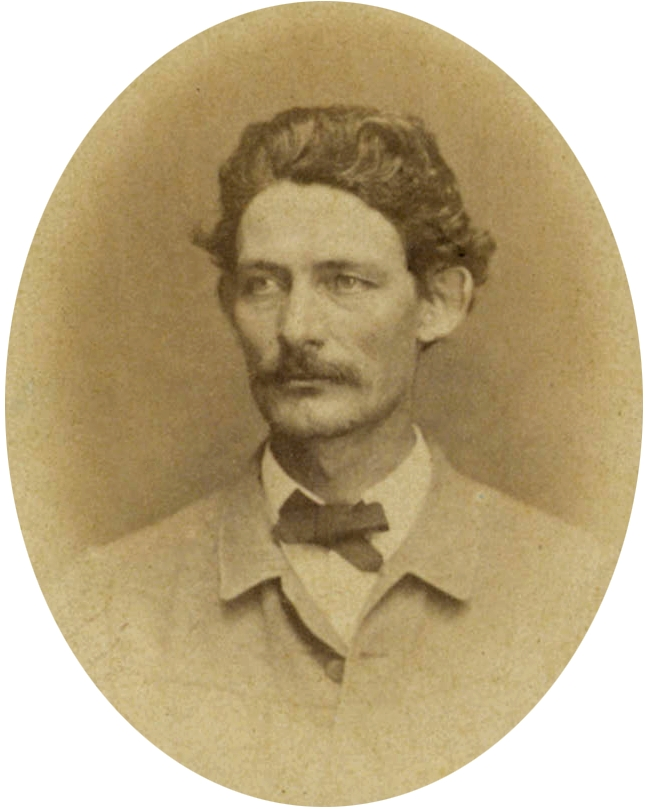
- Hiram B. Granbury
- Born: March 1, 1831; Copiah County, Mississippi
- Died: 30 November 1864 (aged 33); Franklin, Tennessee
- Burial place: Granbury, Texas
- Military career
- Allegiance: Confederate States of America
- Branch: Confederate States Army
- Service years: 1861–1864
- Rank: Brigadier General
- Conflicts: American Civil War: Battle of Raymond; Battle of Jackson; Siege of Chattanooga; Battle of Chickamauga; Battle of Missionary Ridge; Battle of Ringgold Gap; Second Battle of Franklin †

Hiram Bronson Granbury (March 1, 1831 – November 30, 1864) was a lawyer and county judge in Texas before the American Civil War. He organized a volunteer company for the Confederate States Army after the outbreak of the Civil War and became its captain. He rose to the grade of brigadier general in the Confederate army. Granbury was one of the six Confederate generals killed at the Battle of Franklin on November 30, 1864.

== Early life ==
Hiram Bronson Granbury was born in Copiah County, Mississippi, March 1, 1831. He was the son of a Baptist minister. He was born Hiram Granberry, but upon reaching adulthood, by 1852 Granberry had changed the spelling of his name to Granbury. After being educated at Oakland College, near Rodney, Mississippi, he moved to Waco, Texas, in the early 1850s. Granbury studied law at Baylor University in Waco, was admitted to the bar and served as chief justice of McLennan County, Texas (a largely administrative position as head of the county court), from 1856 to 1858. During that time, Granbury also served as secretary of Waco Masonic Lodge #92.

== Civil War ==
=== Fort Donelson, capture, exchange ===
Upon the secession of Texas from the Union, Granbury organized the Waco Guards, a volunteer infantry company, and headed east to Kentucky with them as their first captain. In October 1861, he was elected major of the 7th Texas Infantry Regiment. He was captured along with his regiment at the Battle of Fort Donelson on February 16, 1862. Granbury was imprisoned at Fort Warren in Boston Harbor but was permitted to visit Baltimore on parole in order to attend to his wife, who was to have an operation. He was freed in an exchange of prisoners on August 27, 1862, for two lieutenants. Almost immediately, on August 29, 1862, Granbury was promoted to colonel of the 7th Texas Infantry Regiment. He was temporarily without a command until January 1863 because the 7th Texas Infantry Regiment was not exchanged until November 1862 and was consolidated with two other regiments until January 1863.

=== Vicksburg campaign, Chattanooga, Chickamauga, Atlanta campaign ===
Granbury and his regiment served in north Mississippi with General Joseph E. Johnston's Army of Tennessee during the Vicksburg Campaign. Colonel Granbury led the regiment in the battles of Raymond and Jackson. Granbury fought and was wounded at the Battle of Chickamauga. He then participated in the Siege of Chattanooga and the Battle of Missionary Ridge. When Brigadier General James Argyle Smith was wounded at Chattanooga, Granbury led the brigade in the retreat from Chattanooga. Division commander, Major General Patrick R. Cleburne, commended Colonel Granbury for his handling of the brigade.

=== Battle of Franklin, death ===
Brigadier General James A Smith returned to the brigade command for the Atlanta Campaign. At about the same time, on February 29, 1864, Colonel Granbury was promoted to brigadier general. He then led the Texas brigade. This brigade was composed of eight (8) understrength Texas regiments, including the 7th Texas Infantry, through the Atlanta campaign. He fought with particular distinction at the Battle of Pickett's Mill in the Atlanta Campaign.

General John B. Hood had taken over command of the Army of Tennessee during the Atlanta Campaign. After the fall of Atlanta, Hood moved his army into Tennessee in an effort to retake Nashville for the Confederacy. At the Battle of Franklin on November 30, 1864, Hood ordered 18 brigades to make numerous hopeless frontal assaults against fortified positions occupied by the Union Army forces under Major General John M. Schofield. Granbury's brigade charged the center of the Federal breastworks and he was shot and killed, along with Major General Patrick R. Cleburne, just 40 yards outside the Union works. In total, six Confederate generals died in or as a result of the battle. Brigadier General James A. Smith took command of Cleburne's division at the subsequent Battle of Nashville.

== Reburial at Granbury, Texas ==
Twenty-nine years after the battle of Franklin, Hiram Granbury's body was moved to Granbury, Texas, a town named after him.

At the time of Granbury's death, he was serving as the elected Senior Warden of Waco Masonic Lodge #92, the oldest organization still in existence in McLennan County. This meant that had he survived the War, he was in line to become the lead officer of the lodge the very next year.

The city of Granbury celebrates an annual General Granbury's Birthday Bash.

== See also ==
- List of American Civil War generals (Confederate)
