= Felix Huston =

American lawyer and businessman

Felix Huston (1800–1857) was a lawyer, soldier, military opportunist and the first commanding general of the Army of the Republic of Texas under the Constitution of 1836.

== Early life and career ==
Huston was born in Kentucky. He was a slave trader, planter, Whig politician, and attorney in Natchez, Mississippi. Receiving news of the Texas Revolution, he raised and equipped troops (often at his own expense) and money throughout Mississippi and Kentucky.

== Move to Texas ==
He left Natchez on May 5, 1836, with 500 to 700 volunteers to join the Texian army, but arrived well after the Battle of San Jacinto in which Mexican President General Santa Anna ceded defeat and, in effect, granted Texas her independence.

=== Militia commander ===
On June 25, Texas President David G. Burnet appointed Major General Mirabeau B. Lamar as secretary of war, to succeed the resigning Thomas J. Rusk. Texas received word that Mexico had rejected the Treaty of Velasco and had sent General José de Urrea to attack Goliad, Rusk immediately rescinded his resignation. Huston and Thomas Jefferson Green teamed up to get the army to oppose Lamar, and Rusk resumed command. However, the Mexican attack failed to materialize, and Rusk retired. The Texan army picked Huston to replace him. Discontent continued and army officers openly defied the government and threatened to impose a military dictatorship.

=== Army commander ===
On December 20, 1836, Sam Houston commissioned Huston as a brigadier general in the 2,000-man army and temporary commander-in-chief. His men referred to him as "Old Long Shanks" or "Old Leather Breeches", and Huston attracted adventurers and men of little discipline to his "Camp Independence" in Jackson County. He feared San Antonio could not be defended in the event of another Mexican invasion, and ordered the town and the nearby Alamo to be burned.

However, Juan Seguín intervened, and the town and historic mission were spared from destruction. Later in the year, Sam Houston appointed Albert Sidney Johnston as the senior brigadier general and permanent commander of the Texan army. Huston felt slighted, and challenged Johnston to a duel on February 5, 1837, wounding him in the right hip.

In November 1839, Huston was elected as major general of the militia, defeating James C. Neill and other candidates. He developed an aggressive scheme to capture Matamoros, Tamaulipas, in 1840, believing that Texas should expand its borders southward beyond the Rio Grande. However, his desires were thwarted by moderates.

=== Indian wars ===
In August, war chief Little Buffalo Hump and 500 Comanche Indians attacked Victoria, Texas, and other nearby towns, stealing horses and livestock and killing dozens of white settlers. Huston led 200 Texans and Chief Placido and his Tonkawa scouts against the raiders at Plum Creek near Lockhart on the evening of August 11, killing 80 Comanches while only losing one man.

=== Decommission ===
In May 1837, President Sam Houston furloughed much of the Texas army, leaving Huston a general without troops to command. Shortly after the Battle of Plum Creek, Huston left Texas and co-founded a law firm in New Orleans.

In 1844, he supported a movement to annex the republic to the United States. However, by the late 1850s, Huston had become an ardent secessionist. In 1851, he spoke at a rally in New Orleans supporting Cuban independence from Spain.

== Death ==
In 1857, he died in Natchez, Mississippi.
