= First Regiment of Texas Mounted Rifle Volunteers =

Mounted rifle regiment of the United States Army

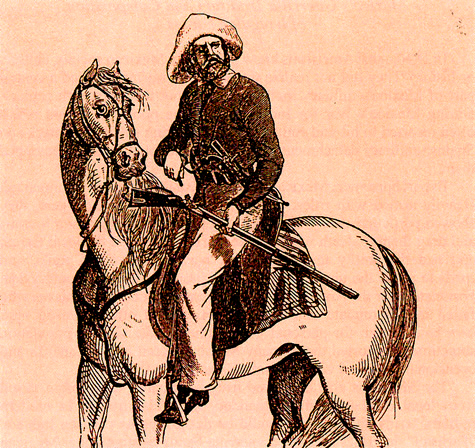
- Active: June–October 1846
- Country: United States
- Allegiance: Texas
- Branch: United States Volunteers
- Type: Mounted rifle
- Size: Regiment
- Battles: Mexican–American War; Battle of Monterrey

Commanders
- Commanding officer: Col. John C. Hays

First Regiment of Texas Mounted Rifle Volunteers, also known as Hays's Texas Rangers, was a mounted rifle formation of United States Volunteers during the Mexican–American War. Made up of Texas Rangers, the regiment distinguished itself at the Battle of Monterrey.

== Formation ==
At the commencement of hostilities between American and Mexican forces, General Zachary Taylor asked the Texas government to mobilize troops for the war. William Gordon Cooke, the adjutant general of Texas, called for two regiments of cavalry to serve for six months, furnishing their own weapons and horses. The first regiment to be completed came from the western part of the state and had a core of leaders that already was serving in the Texas Rangers.

The first to enlist was a quickly organized company of 26 men from Corpus Christi under the Ranger captain Samuel Hamilton Walker, which mustered into federal service in April 1846. The Ranger captain John C. Hays began to mobilize the newly reorganized Texas frontier militia companies, recruiting them up to strength to fill the requirements for a mounted regiment. His men were mustered into federal service in June and July 1846 as the First Regiment of Texas Mounted Rifle Volunteers, a part of Zachary Taylor's Army of Occupation. Hays served as colonel and Walker as lieutenant colonel.

== History ==
Zachary Taylor's initial army had a shortage of cavalry. It had only four companies from the 2nd U.S. Dragoons, two of which were soon captured by the Mexicans. Walker's company began its service patrolling the army's line of communications and gathering intelligence about enemy forces. During the Battle of Palo Alto, it also acted as standard cavalry, fighting the Mexican horsemen. When Hays's Texas Rangers joined Taylor's army, Walker's company was included in its organization with Walker as lieutenant colonel. The full regiment was ordered to protect and screen the army during its advance.

The Rangers of Capt. Ben McCulloch's Gonzales Company entered federal service and were detached with James Gillespie's company as long-range reconnaissance and intelligence units ("Spy Companies"). McCulloch was promoted to major and, although technically organized as part of the Quartermaster Department, functioned in fact as Gen. Taylor's chief of intelligence ("Chief of Spies") under his personal control. These two companies gathered intelligence on the Mexican army, the roads, and the countryside along the army's line of advance.

Hays's Rangers and the Second Texas Mounted Volunteers both being fully organized, the two mounted regiments were formed into a volunteer division under the command of the governor of Texas James Pinckney Henderson, who was given the rank of major general. The rest of the general staff included the former president of Texas Mirabeau B. Lamar acting as Henderson's division inspector with the rank of lieutenant colonel, Maj. Henry L. Kinney as his division quartermaster, and Sam Houston's former vice president Maj. Edward Burleson and representative Maj. Edward Clark as his aides de camp.

The 1st regiment operated ahead of the main army, while the 2nd regiment acted as force protection as it marched. Gen. Taylor decided to attack western Monterrey using William J. Worth's division in a giant north and west hook movement while simultaneously attacking from the east with his main body. Worth started on 20 September along with Hays's Texas Rangers screening the advance, but they camped for the night three miles from the Saltillo road. On 23 September, Worth sent Hays's Texas Rangers and the 4th and 8th U.S. Infantry under Lt. Col. Thomas Childs to take Fort Libertad. This was accomplished by daybreak. With the help of James Duncan's battery, they soon took the Obispado and had control of western Monterrey. By then, the Mexicans had abandoned their outer defenses on the east side of Monterrey, concentrating in the Plaza Mayor and John A. Quitman's brigade held eastern Monterrey.

When General Taylor after the Battle of Monterrey entered into an agreement of cease fire with the Mexican forces, he found it most convenient to discharge the Texas units in order to avoid confrontation with the local population during the occupation of Monterrey.

== Order of battle ==
=== Staff ===
- 1 Colonel: John C. Hays
- 1 Lieutenant Colonel: Samuel H. Walker
- 1 Major: Michael H. Chevallie
- 1 Adjutant: 2nd Lt. Charles A. Harper
- 1 Sergeant Major
- 1 Quartermaster Sergeant
- 2 Principal Musicians

=== Companies ===
- 1 Captain: Christopher B. Acklen, James Gillespie, Claiborne C. Herbert, Frank S. Early, Thomas Green, Jerome B. McCown, Robert Addison Gillespie (KIA Monterrey), Henry E. McCulloch, Samuel L.S. Ballowe, Joseph P. Wells
- 1 First Lieutenant: Gabriel M. Armstrong, Thomas Early, Alfred Evans, Walter Paye Lane, Sampson McCown, William E. Reese (wounded Monterrey), William H. Sellers, George Thrahan, William A.A. Wallace, Henderson Yoakum
- 2 Second Lieutenants: Fielding Alston (died March 1847), James Coffee, John H. Day, William B.P. Gaines, Daniel Grady (resigned Sept. 1846), A. McNeill, G.H. Nelson, John Page, Christopher R. Perry, Reding S. Pridgen, George W. Rogers, John Story
- 4 Sergeants
- 4 Corporals
- 2 Musicians
- 80 Privates
