= Battle of Pulang Lupa =

1900 battle of the Philippine-American War

- Part of Philippine–American War
Date	September 13, 1900
Location	Marinduque, Philippines
Result	Filipino victory

Belligerents
Philippine Republic	United States

Commanders and leaders
Maximo Abad	Luther Hare (United States) Devereux Shields (surrendered)

Strength
1,180–2,250 total 180–250 riflemen 1,000–2,000 bolomen	54 29th U.S. Infantryman

Casualties and losses
Unknown	4 killed 50 captured (6 of whom wounded)

The Battle of Pulang Lupa (Filipino: Labanan sa Pulang Lupa, Spanish: Batalla de Tierra Roja) was an engagement fought on September 13, 1900, during the Philippine–American War, between the forces of Colonel Maximo Abad and Devereux Shields, in which Abad's men defeated the American force.

"The severity with which the inhabitants have been dealt would not look well if a complete history of it were written out." —Governor-General of the Philippines William Howard Taft, concerning the U.S. Army campaign on the island of Marinduque during the Philippine–American War of 1899–1902

== Background ==
On September 11, Captain Devereux Shields led a detachment of 54 29th U.S. Volunteer Infantrymen into the mountains of Torrijos to combat the elusive Abad and his guerrillas. They experienced little success, except for the dispersing of 20 guerrillas, in which no casualties were inflicted on either side.

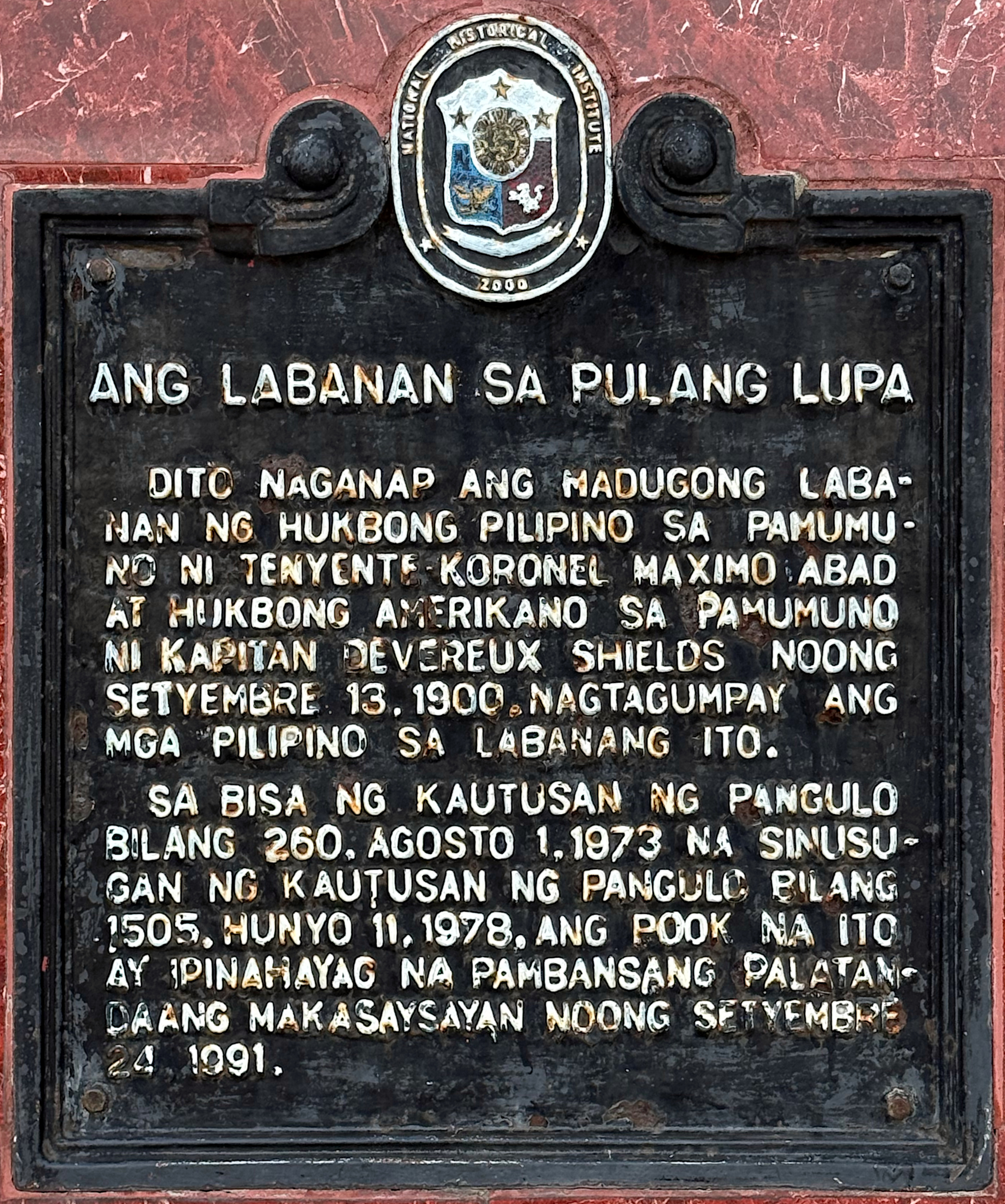
National historical marker installed in 2000 inside the memorial area established at the vicinity of the battle

Abad had excellent intelligence and was informed of Shields' movements by the local guerrillas ahead of time. In response, he assembled his entire force of around 180–250 regular Filipino soldiers and 1,000–2,000 bolomen, although some sources claim as few as 300 altogether. The regular Philippine soldiers were well organized and reasonably well armed with bolos, pistols, and Spanish Mausers, despite the fact that most were poor shots. The bolomen, armed only with machetes or bolos, served mainly to bolster Abad's forces. Dressed as friendly farmers or civilians in the daytime, they took part in guerrilla activities at night: ambushing small detachments of American soldiers, sabotage, and most importantly, supplying Abad with intelligence on American positions and movements. They had little military value however, considering they had no firearms.

== Battle ==
On September 13, Abad positioned his men along a steep ridge overlooking the trail which Shields would soon cross. Both Shields and his men had little combat experience and easily fell into the trap. Abad and his 250 soldiers opened fire on the column, which led to a fire-fight that lasted for several hours. Meanwhile, as the Americans and Philippine riflemen exchanged fire, the large force of Filipino bolomen began maneuvering to surround the Americans.

Shields, seeing that he was almost completely surrounded, ordered a withdrawal, which soon turned into a full-blown retreat, as Abad's much larger force poured over the ridge after Shields and his men. The Filipino soldiers harassed Shields for nearly 4 miles (6 km) before cornering them in a small rice field; their escape to Santa Cruz was cut off by the large force of Filipino bolomen. Abad's men again opened fire, forcing the Americans to take cover behind some paddy dikes. Shields, wounded and recognizing the futility of the situation, raised the white flag in order to surrender.

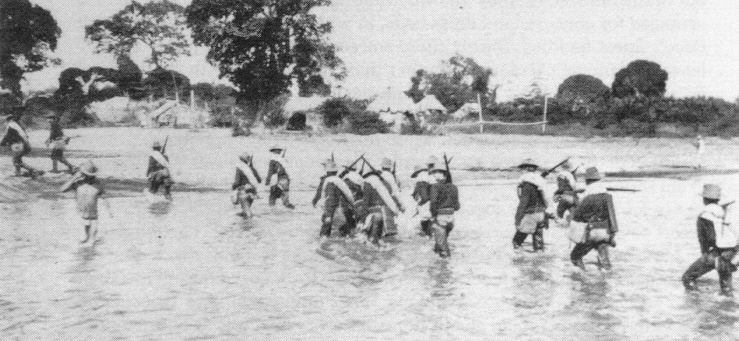
Men of the 29th volunteer infantry wading ashore on Marinduque April 25, 1900

After months of hiding, Abad in only a few hours eliminated nearly one third of the American garrison on Marinduque.

== Aftermath ==
Shields' defeat sent shock waves through the American high command. Aside from being one of the worst defeats suffered by the Americans during the war, it was especially significant given its proximity to the upcoming election between President William McKinley and his anti-imperialist opponent William Jennings Bryan, the outcome of which many believed would determine the ultimate course of the war. Consequently, the defeat triggered a sharp response.

Arthur MacArthur, Jr. sent Brig. Gen. Luther Hare with "orders to treat the entire male population over fifteen as potential enemies and to arrest as many as possible and hold them hostages until Abad surrendered." Hare secured the release of Shields and his men. Maj. Frederick A. Smith continued the policy of destroying food and shelter in the interior of the island, and moving all civilians into the towns. Although Abad and most of his command continued to elude the American military, the civilian population was suffering for it, with many landowners and merchants joining the Federal Party, turning against Abad.

These new tactics led to the surrender of Abad in April 1901.

Shields and his men would also be released by Maximo Abad on October 15, 1900, in Buenavista, Quezon

== See also ==
- Campaigns of the Philippine-American War

== Note ==
1. "The U.S. Army's Pacification of Marinduque, Philippine Islands, April 1900-April 1901", Andrew J. Birtle, The Journal of Military History, April 1997, Vol. 61, No. 2, p. 255; Jessup, Philip Caryl (1938). Elihu Root. Dodd, Mead, & Co./Reprint Services Corp. p. 341. ISBN 0-7812-4908-2.
