= Operation Phalanx (Mexican drug war) =

United States National Guard program

Operation Phalanx was a United States National Guard program to assist the Department of Homeland Security in the security of the Mexico–United States border. Beginning in 2010, Phalanx was the successor operation to 2006–2008 program known as Operation Jump Start.

Since the beginning of Operation Phalanx in 2010, National Guard airmen flying UH-72 Lakota helicopters have been credited with stopping 64,000 illegal border crossings in the Rio Grande sector of the United States Mexico border, along with an additional 25,000 in the Laredo sector and 21,000 in the Tucson area. More than 300,000 pounds of marijuana has also been seized in Phalanx operations.

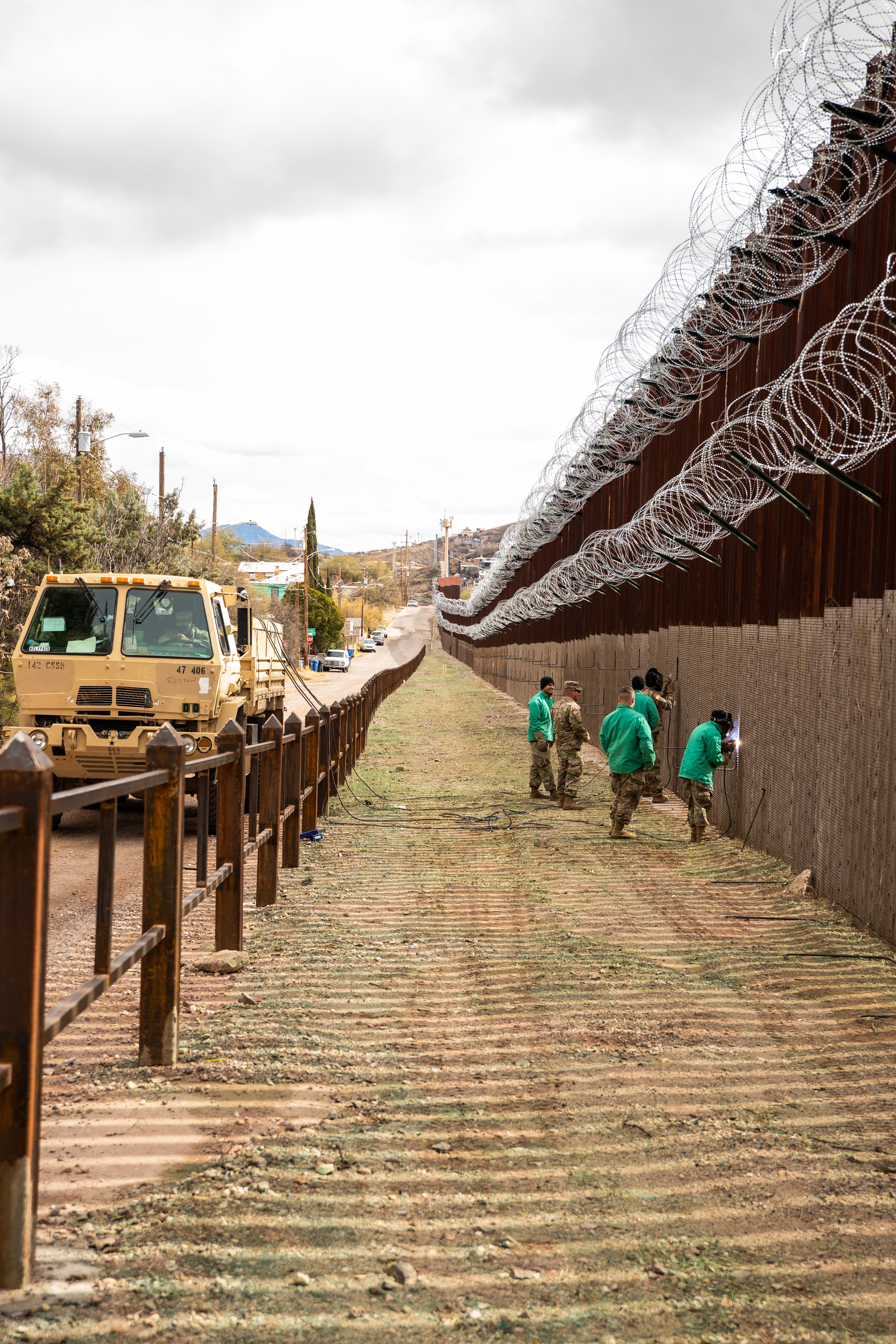
Border barrier in Nogales
