= Luther Hare =

United States Army general (1851–1929)

Luther Rector Hare
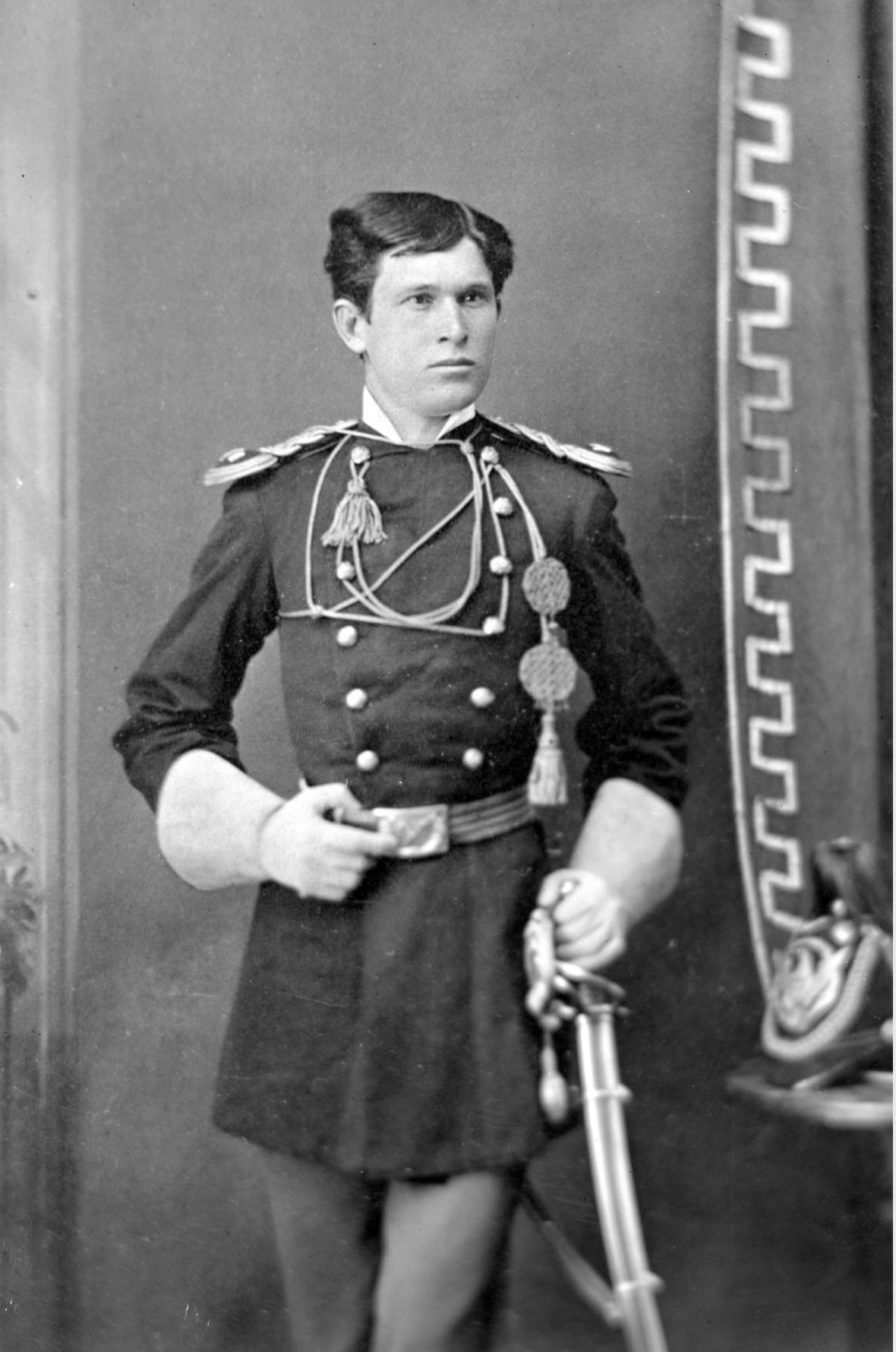
- Luther R. Hare
- Born: August 24, 1851; Greencastle, Indiana
- Died: December 22, 1929 (aged 78); Washington, D.C.
- Burial place: Arlington National Cemetery
- Military career
- Allegiance: United States of America
- Branch: United States Army and United States Volunteers
- Service years: 1874–1905, 1908–1911, 1918–1919
- Rank: Colonel; Brigadier General, USV
- Unit: 7th U.S. Cavalry
- Conflicts: American Indian Wars: Battle of Little Big Horn; Nez Perce War; Spanish–American War; Philippine–American War: Battle of San Jacinto; Battle of Pulang Lupa; World War I

Luther Rector Hare (August 24, 1851 – December 22, 1929) was an officer in the 7th U.S. Cavalry, best known for participating in the Battle of the Little Big Horn.

Hare was born in Greencastle, Indiana to Silas Hare and his wife Octavia Elizabeth Rector. His family moved to Texas in 1853. He entered West Point in 1870 and graduated 17 June 1874, joining the 7th Cavalry later that year. By the time of the Great Sioux War, he was a second lieutenant in Company K (Lt Godfrey Commanding), serving in the battalion commanded by Capt. Frederick Benteen.

During the June 1876 expedition to the Little Bighorn River, Lieutenant Hare was on detached service assisting Lt. Charles Varnum with the Indian scouts, being appointed assistant on the evening of the 24th of June. During the siege on Reno's Hill, he served as Maj. Marcus Reno's adjutant, since Lt. Benjamin Hodgson had been killed during the retreat from the woods. Hare later gave testimony at the subsequent Reno Court of Inquiry in 1879.

Hare participated in the Nez Perce War (1877), Spanish–American War, and Philippine American War, notably in the recovery of captured US forces following the Battle of Pulang Lupa. Hare was awarded two Silver Star (medal)s and cited "for gallantry in action against insurgent forces at San Jacinto, Luzon, P. I., Nov. 11, 1899," and again "for gallantry in action in the pursuit of superior forces of the enemy under the insurgent General Tinio in Northern Luzon, P. I., Dec. 4‑18, 1899, through a most dangerous and difficult country, through hardships and exposure, thereby forcing the enemy to liberate 22 American prisoners held by him, Dec. 18, 1899." He also commanded U.S. forces on the island of Marinduque, where he instated a policy of civilian internment. Hare retired on medical disability in July 1903, but served several stints on active duty after that, retiring for the final time in February 1919.

Hare died at Walter Reed Hospital in Washington, D.C., and was buried at Arlington National Cemetery, in Arlington, Virginia.
