= Xavier Debray =

American brigadier general and diplomat

Xavier Blanchard Debray
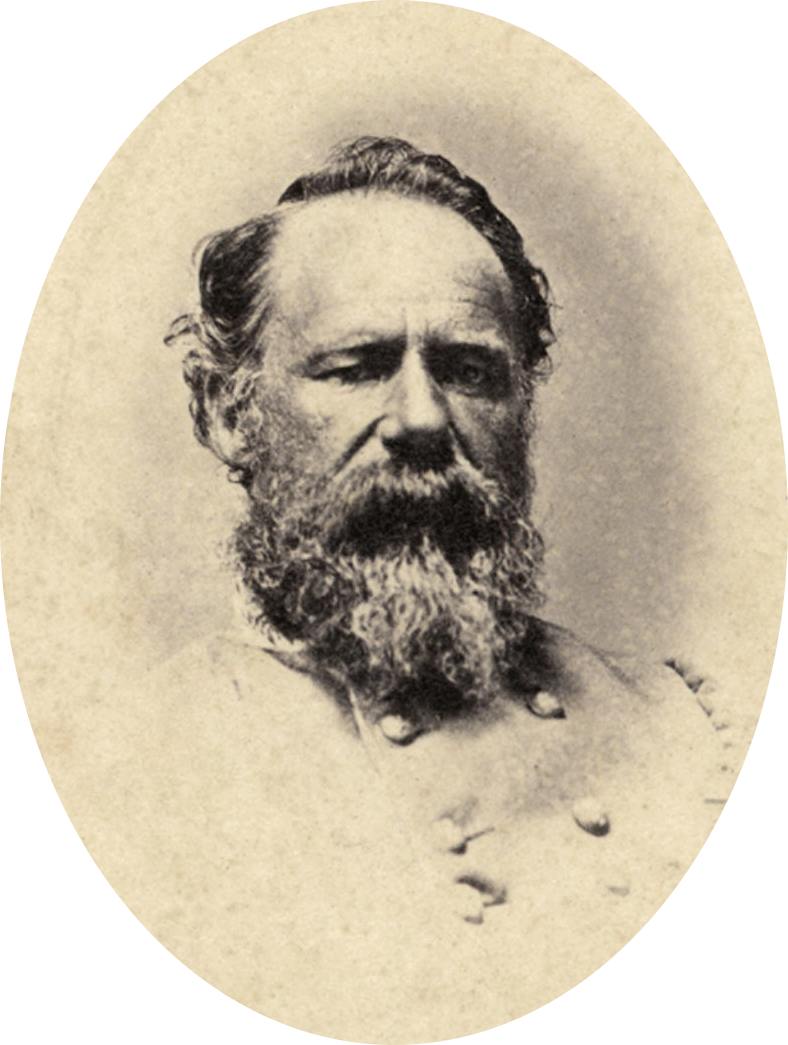
- Debray circa 1864
- Born: January 25, 1818; Épinal, France
- Died: January 6, 1895 (aged 76); Austin, Texas
- Military career
- Allegiance: France; Confederate States of America
- Branch: Confederate States Army
- Rank: Brigadier General (CSA)
- Conflicts: American Civil War: Battle of Mansfield; Battle of Pleasant Hill

Xavier Blanchard Debray (January 25, 1818 – January 6, 1895) was an American soldier and diplomat. During the American Civil War Debray raised a Confederate cavalry regiment from Bexar County, Texas and was appointed brigadier general before the war's end.

== Early life ==
Xavier Debray was born in or near Épinal, France, as Xavier Blanchard, the son of Nicolas Blanchard and Catherine Benezech. He is said to have attended the École spéciale militaire de Saint-Cyr Debray worked in the French diplomatic service before immigrating to the United States in 1848 under something of a cloud in disagreement with the French Government. After serving in the U.S. Army's 2nd Dragoons, he settled in Texas and became a naturalized citizen in 1855. Debray published a Spanish language newspaper in San Antonio in the years before the American Civil War, opening a thriving academy and providing translations for the General Land Office.

== Military career ==
At war's outbreak Debray became an aide-de-camp to Texas governor Edward Clark as a major in the 2nd Texas Infantry Regiment. Debray raised a cavalry unit from Bexar County, was elected commander of Debray's Texas Cavalry Battalion, and was commissioned colonel on December 5, 1861. He led the unit which became the 26th Texas Cavalry at the Battle of Galveston Bay in 1862 and later during the Red River Campaign serving with distinction at the Battles of Mansfield and Pleasant Hill. Becoming commander of his Cavalry brigade he was later appointed Brigadier General by Kirby Smith for his service in that campaign. With the end of the Civil War, his promotion was never confirmed by the Confederate States Senate.

After the Confederate surrender, Debray lived in Houston and Galveston. Eventually, Debray moved to the state's capitol and resumed translating Spanish, French and English language documents for the Texas General Land Office. Debray died in Austin January 6, 1895, and is buried in the state cemetery there.

== See also ==
- List of American Civil War Generals (Acting Confederate)
