= Action of April 3, 1836 =

Coordinates: 25°52′47″N 97°30′15″W

Battle of Matamoros
Date	April 3, 1836
Location	off Matamoros, Tamaulipas, Gulf of Mexico
Result	Texan victory

Belligerents
Centralist Republic of Mexico	Republic of Texas

Commanders and leaders
Unknown	Jeremiah Brown

Strength
1 brig	1 schooner

Casualties and losses
1 brig sunk	1 schooner damaged

The battle of Matamoros was a naval engagement during the Texas Revolution on April 3, 1836, between the brig Montezuma of the Mexican Navy and the schooner Invincible of the Texas Navy. The Mexican ship was outmaneuvered and repeatedly hit before running aground and being abandoned. The Port of Matamoros, also known as Los Brazos de Santiago, was the Mexican army's primary resupply base for the operations of General Santa Anna, who was finally defeated on April 21, 1836, outside Houston at the battle of San Jacinto.

== Background ==
The Invincible was purchased by the Texan government, then in rebellion, because the Texans were disturbed by the appearance of Mexican naval raiders along the Gulf Coast. Captain Jeremiah Brown was given command of the Invincible on March 12, 1836, in Galveston.

Captain Brown was tasked with defending the Texas coast, and neutralizing the Mexican brig Montezuma. The Invincible cruised south to the mouth of the Rio Grande, where on April 3, 1836, she encountered the ten-gun Mexican brig in the Port of Matamoros (also known as Brazos Santiago, now Boca Chica) at the mouth of the Laguna Madre.

== Battle ==
The Texan ship was outgunned, outmanned, outnumbered and outplanned. The Montezuma had two 68-pounder guns, eight 32-pounder Paixhans guns, and had a crew of about 75 men. The Paixhans guns fired a shell that exploded on impact, creating a shower of shrapnel over the target. The Invincible had two 18-pounder guns, two 9-pounder guns, and four 6-pounder guns and carried a smaller crew than Montezuma.

At 10:00 am the Invincible approached the Montezuma and raised the Texas colors, and Captain Jeremiah Brown ordered his artillerists to open fire on the Montezuma. For a short while the two warships exchanged broadsides, scoring some hits. Invincible outmaneuvered Montezuma by sailing in circles around the Mexican vessel, firing broadsides the entire time. Invincible made only two passes before the slower Mexican cruiser was in flames. Eventually the Montezuma ran aground on a sandbar, sealing her fate. The Mexican officers and crew quickly escaped into the water from the severely damaged vessel and made it ashore on the enemy coast. The Invincible continued to barrage her opponent until she was destroyed. Casualties are unknown.

== Aftermath ==
The Texans emerged victorious, having destroyed the Montezuma. Later that day, the Invincible encountered an American merchant vessel, the Pocket. After engaging and capturing the Pocket, Captain Brown discovered a cache of weapons, as well as supplies being shipped to the Mexican Army. Accompanying the supplies were Mexican naval officers and a considerable amount of military documents, all in Spanish. The Pocket was sent to Galveston under a prize crew. The supplies aboard the Pocket were sent to General Sam Houston's army, where the general used them against the Mexicans at San Jacinto.

This action by the Texas Navy of disrupting the Mexican army's maritime based supply chain, operating through the Port of Matamoros, was a significant factor in the Mexicans' later defeat at San Jacinto, Texas. Their vastly superior army was forced to scatter into several smaller units in order to procure food throughout Texas, thus diluting their numerical advantage.

== Sources ==
- Neu, C.T. (April, 1909), "The Case of the Brig Pocket", Quarterly of the Texas State Historical Association 12: 276–295
- Hill, Jim Dan (1937). The Texas Navy, in Forgotten Battles and Shirtsleeve Diplomacy. Chicago: University of Chicago Press.
- "Montezuma". Official website of the Texas Navies. The Texas Navy Association Retrieved on 2007-09-25.
- "Invincible". Handbook of Texas Online. Texas State Historical Association Retrieved on 2007-09-25.
- Mark (summer, 2007), "Reading the Papers", TCU Magazine
- National Undersea Marine Agency Retrieved on 2007-09-25.
