= San Felipe incident (1835) =

- Part of the Texas Revolution
Date	September 1, 1835
Location	off Brazoria, Texas, Gulf of Mexico 29.0698°N 95.1134°W
Result	Texian victory

Belligerents
Republic of Texas	Mexican Republic

Commanders and leaders
(Republic of Texas) William A. Hurd	Thomas Thompson (surrendered)

Strength
1 schooner 1 steamer	1 schooner

The San Felipe incident was the first naval battle fought between Mexican and rebel forces during the Texas Revolution. Thomas McKinney deliberately provoked the Mexican government by heavily arming the merchant ship San Felipe, filling it with a cargo of munitions meant for Texian revolutionaries, and sending it from New Orleans to Brazoria, Texas. Aboard was a crew of Texians and Stephen F. Austin, recently released from incarceration in Mexico and dedicated to Texian independence from Mexico. On September 1, 1835, as the San Felipe was transferring the last of its cargo to the Laura, also crewed by Texians, the Mexican Navy warship Correo de Mejico approached. Uncharacteristically for merchant vessels both ships reacted aggressively, firing on the Correo and capturing it after a day-long pursuit. The San Felipe's captain, William Hurd, arrested the captain of the Correo, the British-born American citizen Thomas Thompson, as well as the crew. Though Thompson was a commissioned officer of the Mexican navy, Hurd brought them back to New Orleans as pirates. Thompson had been seizing smuggling ships along the coast which had begun carrying arms in to the rebels in Texas and the capture of him and his ship cleared the way for more arms and support for the rebels to move into the area.

== See also ==
- Naval Battle of Campeche
