= Operation Jump Start =

2006–2008 American military operation

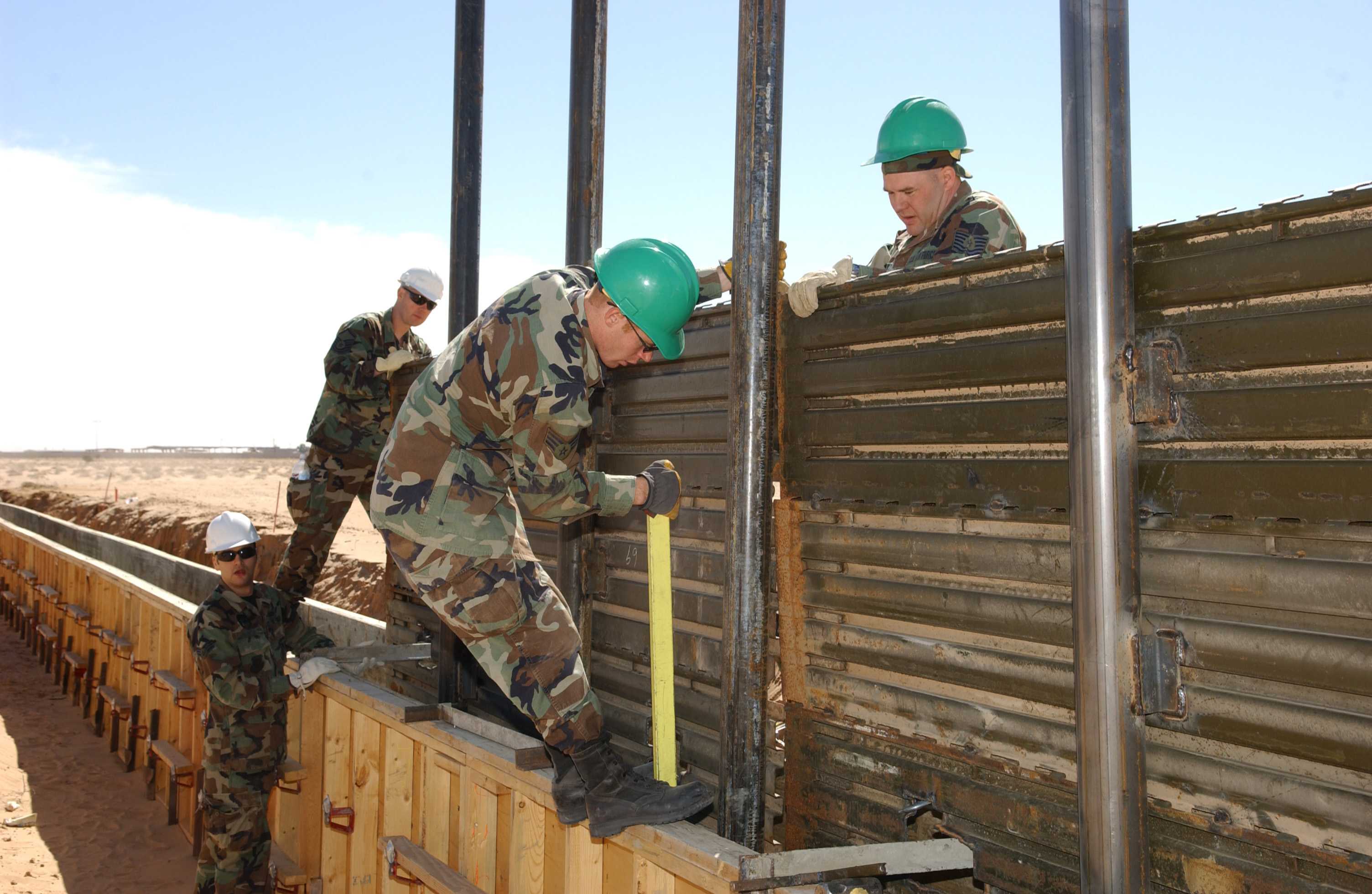
- Air National Guardsmen construct a fence along the Mexican border in 2007
- Date: 2006–July 15 2008
- Location: Mexico–United States border
- Participants: National Guard of the United States

Operation Jump Start was a military operation to aid U.S. Customs and Border Protection, announced by President George W. Bush in May 2006. The mission entailed the deployment of United States National Guard troops along the Mexico–United States border for purposes of enforcement of border security and construction of a border fence. The rules of deployment were defined in a memorandum of agreement between officials in the Department of Defense and the governors of Arizona, California, New Mexico, Texas, and Mexico.

National Guard members involved in the operation were not involved in law enforcement activities due to the political and moral aspect of using troops on the U.S./Mexico border. They were supporting the U.S. Customs and Border Protection and U.S. Border Patrol agencies with administrative, observational and intelligence gathering capacities, and civil engineering projects. By temporarily taking over these functions from the USC&BP, they freed up sworn agents to field units.

Military operations with Operation Jump Start were primarily to observe and report. The rules of engagement for the operation were very restrictive and only allowed escalation to lethality when met with an equal amount of force from another. The National Guard set up entry identification team sites to spot undocumented aliens. Many of the areas of operation were in desolate locations; some locations were so remote that troops were flown in by UH-60 helicopters.

== Statistical summary ==
On 15 July 2008, Operation Jump Start came to an end. At its peak there were as many as 6,000 National Guard soldiers and airmen on the mission with more than 29,000 from every state and territory. During the operation:

- More than 176,000 illegal aliens were apprehended
- More than 1,100 vehicles were seized
- More than 321,000 pounds (146,000 kg) of marijuana and cocaine were seized
- More than 28,000 hours of flight time were logged by National Guard pilots
- More than 19 miles (31 km) of road, 38 miles (61 km) of fencing and 96 miles (154 km) of vehicle barriers were built
- Close to 720 miles (1,160 km) of road were repaired.

== Service medal ==
In 2008, the Armed Forces Service Medal was authorized for National Guard forces deployed to Texas, New Mexico, Arizona and California to assist the Department of Homeland Security with securing the southwest U.S. border.
