= Woodford H. Mabry =

19th adjutant general of Texas, namesake of Camp Mabry

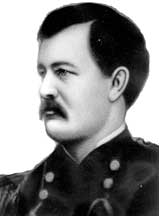

19th Adjutant General of Texas
- In office January 23, 1891 – May 5, 1898
- Governor: Jim Hogg; Charles A. Culberson
- Preceded by: Wilburn Hill King
- Succeeded by: Alfred Prior Wozencraft

Personal details
- Born: September 3, 1856 Jefferson, Texas, U.S.
- Died: January 4, 1899 (aged 42) San Antonio, Texas, U.S.
- Resting place: Oakwood Cemetery; Jefferson, Texas, U.S.
- Spouse: Lucy Allen
- Relations: Hinche Parham Mabry (father)
- Children: 7
- Education: Virginia Military Institute

Military service
- Rank: Captain; Brigadier-General
- Battles/wars: Spanish–American War

Woodford H. Mabry (September 3, 1856 – January 4, 1899) was a career military officer who served as the 19th adjutant general of Texas from 1891 until 1898. He is the namesake of Camp Mabry.

== Early life and education ==
Mabry was born in Jefferson, Texas on September 3, 1856, the son of Confederate Colonel Hinche Parham Mabry and Abbie Haywood Mabry. He attended Virginia Military Institute before entering the wholesaling business. He was married to Lucy Allen, and they had seven children.

== Military career ==
Texas Rangers gathered at El Paso in 1896. Mabry is at the front row on the far left.

In January 1891, Mabry was appointed Adjutant General of Texas by Governor of Texas Jim Hogg. The following year, in 1892, Mabry urged Austin citizens to donate more than 85 acres for the purposes of providing training space for members of the Texas Volunteer Guard.

During his tenure as Adjutant General, Mabry was recognized for raising the Frontier Battalion of the Texas Rangers and the Texas Volunteer Guard to high standards of operations and efficiency. He also led activities to prevent mob violence in Texas, oppress the revolutionary activities of Catarino Garza, and attempt to stop the illegal Maher–Fitzsimmons fight.

=== Spanish–American War ===
With the outbreak of the Spanish–American War, Mabry resigned his post as Adjutant General in May 1898 and took command, as a colonel, of the 1st Texas Volunteer Infantry.

In 1898, shortly before his death, Mabry was recommended for a commission as a Major by Brigadier General Lloyd Wheaton and major general of volunteers J. Warren Keifer.

== Death ==
General Mabry died of malaria on January 4, 1899 at Camp Columbia. In recognition of his service, the United States Congress granted a life pension to his widow of fifty dollars per month.

== Awards and honors ==
Fort Mabry was named in his honor in 1892 by vote of the companies of the Texas Volunteer Guard.

In 1988, Mabry was posthumously inducted to the Texas Hall of Honor in 1988. His uniform is on display at the Texas Military Forces Museum.

Military offices
Preceded by Wilburn Hill King	Adjutant General of Texas; 1891–1898	Succeeded by Alfred Prior Wozencraft
