= Former Texas State Guard Association Medal =

State Guard Association of Texas Medal
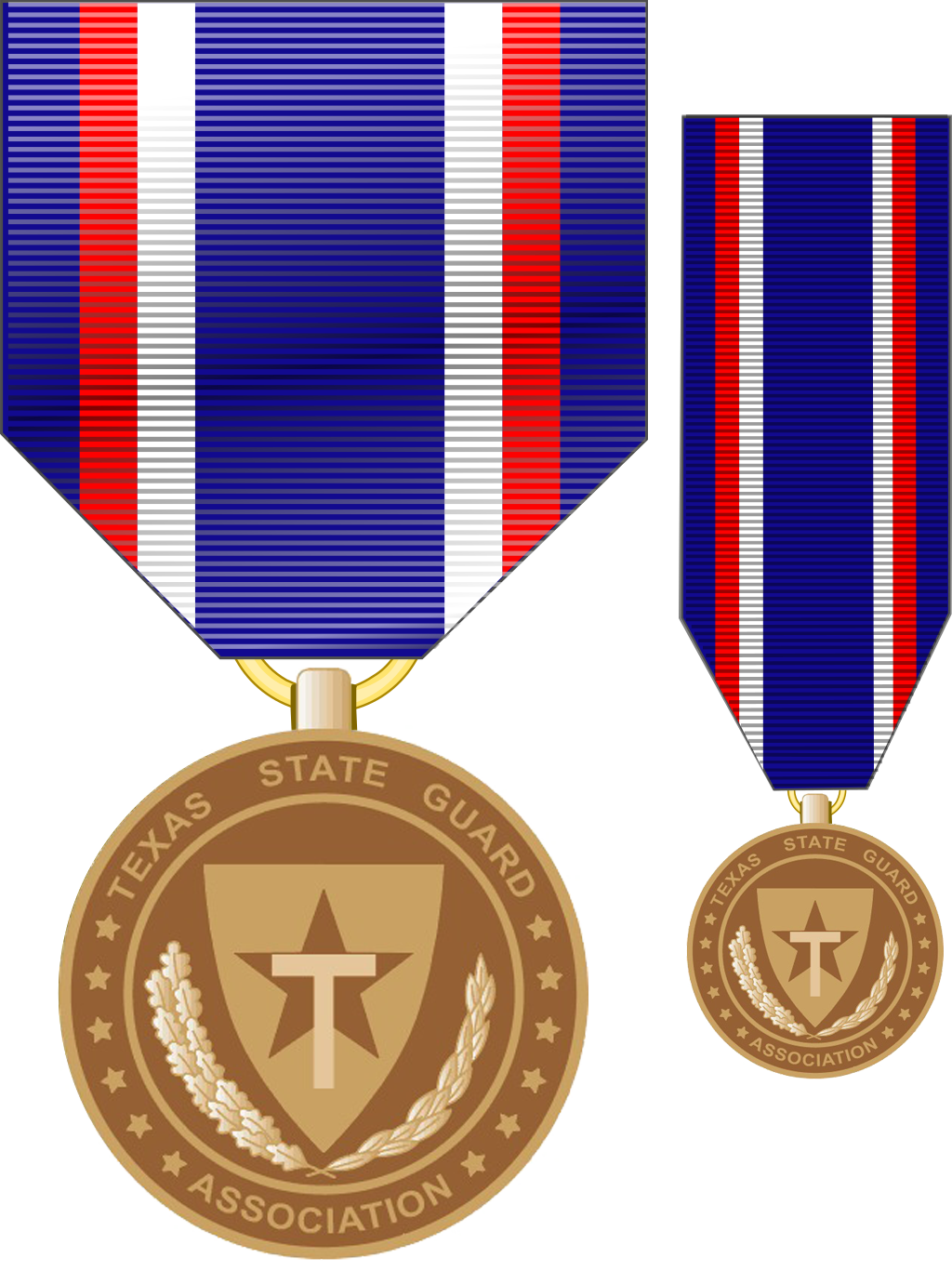
- Type: Military decoration
- Awarded for: Service
- Description: The ribbon drape is of blue, white and red stripes. The medal is bronze with the coat of arms of the Texas State Guard and olive and live oak branches on either side. The words "Texas State Guard Association" encircle the outer ring of the medal.
- Presented by: State Guard Association of Texas
- Eligibility: Awarded to former members of the Texas State Guard Association and current members of the State Guard Association of Texas
- Status: Currently awarded.
- Ribbon of the Former Texas State Guard Association Medal

Precedence
- Next (lower): James Bowie Award Ribbon

The State Guard Association of Texas Medal, formerly known as the Texas State Guard Association Medal, is a medal within the awards and decorations of the State Guard Association of Texas that may be awarded to a member of the Texas Military Forces. This includes Air National Guard, Army National Guard, and State Guard.

== Use ==
The medal was first presented for previous membership in the Texas State Guard Association. Life members of the association wear the hourglass device with the award.

The medal is now presented for current membership in the State Guard Association of Texas using the original design as an homage to the legacy of the Texas State Guard Association that the State Guard Association of Texas carries forward.
