= Hall of Honor (Texas Military) =

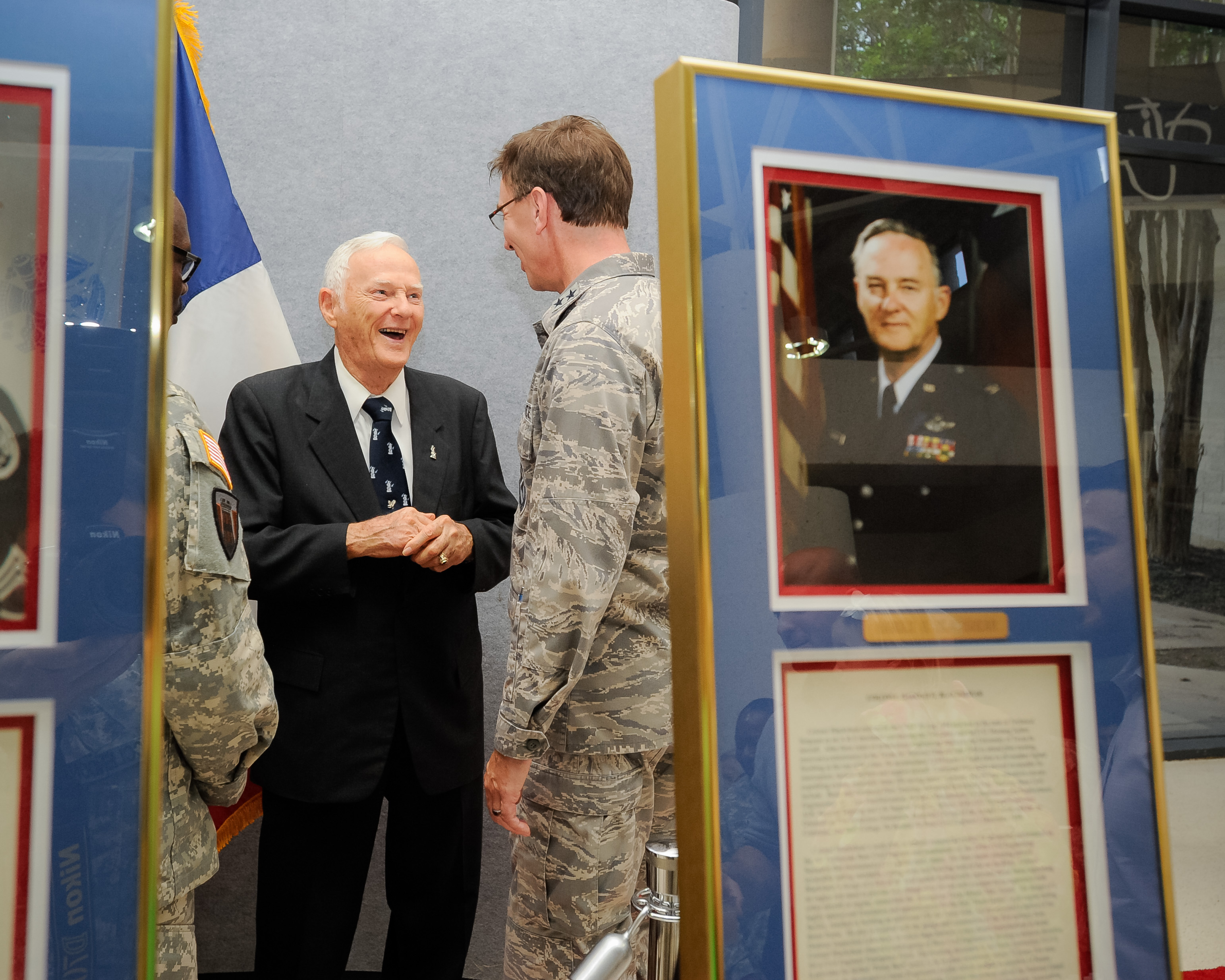
Inductee Colonel Harold H. Blackshear, June 2015

The Hall of Honor was established by the Texas Military Department in 1980 to "recognize outstanding service and leadership" of Texas Military Forces service members operating under state or federal command. As of 2018, it has 120 inductees.

The Hall of Honor is hosted by the Texas Military Forces Museum at Camp Mabry. It is both an exhibit with a digital kiosk that showcases inductee biographies, and an eponymous conference center that may be rented for conventions or banquets. Inductees also receive a trophy, which has varied in type since 1980.

== Criteria ==
- Hall of Honor inductee trophy
  Any former, living or deceased, service member or civilian employee of the Texas Military Department
- Service members must have received an honorable discharge
- Nominees must have retired/resigned at least three (3) years prior to the nomination date
- Nominees must have performed a service/deed, while serving or employed, that reflects "great credit" upon the Texas Military Department
- Nominees must have made an extraordinary and positive difference in the continual transformation of the Texas Military, changing the outlook and focus of the organization and/or shaping the organizational environment for the future

== Inductees ==
Year	Inductee	Portrait	Abbreviated Citation	Ref(s)
1980	Lieutenant General (Brevet) Albert S. Johnson			
1980	Major General Harry H. Johnson			
1980	Major General Carl L. Phinney			
1980	Major General Harley B. West			
1980	Captain Henry T. Waskow		Battle of San Pietro Infine	
1980	Lieutenant Jack L. Knight		Medal of Honor, Texas Legislative Medal of Honor	
1981	Lieutenant General (Brevet) Clayton P. Kerr			
1981	Lieutenant General (Brevet) Everett Selden Simpson			
1981	Major General William O. Green			
1981	Colonel Albert C. Pendergast			
1981	Major Edwin G. Hutchings			
1982	Lieutenant General (Brevet) H. Miller Ainsworth			
1982	Lieutenant General (Brevet) Kearie Lee Berry			
1982	Major General (Brevet) Robert M. Ives			
1982	Brigadier General William Steele			
1982	Brigadier General (Brevet) Donald W. Peacock			
1982	Technical Sergeant James M. Logan		Medal of Honor, Texas Legislative Medal of Honor	
1983	Lieutenant General (Brevet) Thomas S. Bishop			
1983	Lieutenant General (Brevet) James D. Scott			
1983	Major General (Brevet) Robert L. Pou Jr.			
1983	Brigadier General (Brevet) David M. Frazior			
1983	Chief Warrant Officer Ignatius J. Stepchinski			
1983	First Sergeant Juan Campos			
1984	Major General James E. Taylor			
1984	Major General D. A. Thompson			
1984	Brigadier General Kelley Arnold			
1984	Brigadier General Thomas D. Blackwell			
1984	Colonel James L. Stell			
1984	Chief Warrant Officer Leonard T. Tallas			
1985	Major General Lloyd M. Bentson Sr.			
1985	Major General Delmer H. Nichols			
1985	Major General Willie L. Scott			
1985	Major General Paul D. Straw			
1985	Lieutenant Colonel (Chaplain) Bernard F. Roemer			
1986	Lieutenant General (Brevet) Ross Ayers			
1986	Major General James C. Smith			
1986	Colonel (Chaplain) Curren R. McLane			
1986	Command Sergeant Major William M. Huggins			
1986	Sergeant Major Albert K. Penrod			
1987	Major General Otto E. Scherz			
1987	Colonel (Brevet) Marion Parks Bowden			
1987	Command Sergeant Major Ernest R. Nero			
1987	Chief Master Sergeant Frank G. Strzelczyk			
1988	Major General Allen D. Rooke			
1988	Brigadier General Woodford H. Mabry			
1988	Brigadier General (Brevet) Douglas N. Presley			
1988	Brigadier General Carl F. Schupp II			
1988	Master Sergeant George W. Britt			
1989	Major General Roland B. Harris			
1989	Major General (Brevet) Jacob F. Wolters			
1989	Lieutenant Colonel William N. Hensley			
1989	Chief Master Sergeant Rudolfo M. Mata			
1990	Brigadier General (Brevet) Joseph T. Blakslee			
1990	Brigadier General (Brevet) Jay A. Matthews Jr.			
1990	Colonel Blucher S. Tharp			
1990	Command Sergeant Major Douglas O. V. Rives			
1990	Chief Master Sergeant Frances M. Arnold			
1991	Major General (Brevet) Max H. Specht			
1991	Brigadier General (Brevet) DeWitt C. Fair Jr.			
1991	Chief Master Sergeant Leonard E. Rice			
1992	Major General James L. Moreland			
1992	Chief Master Sergeant James D. Johnston			
1993	Brigadier General David Heuer			
1993	Chief Warrant Officer 4 James R. Harrison			
1993	Command Sergeant Major Raul Ortega			
1993	Chief Master Sergeant Donald L. Smithers			
1994	Captain Groner A. Pitts			
1995	Lieutenant Colonel Thomas E. Berry			
1996	Brigadier General (Brevet) Richard M. Burrage			
1996	Brigadier General (Brevet) Mickey Francis			
1996	Chief Master Sergeant Clarence E. Leonard			
1997	Major General Bobby W. Hodges			
1997	Brigadier General (Brevet) Grady M. Roberts			
1997	Chief Master Sergeant Oren McClure			
1998	Major General Armin Puck			
1998	Colonel Dale Pyeatt			
1998	Chief Warrant Officer James West			
1999	Major General John Garrett			
1999	Major General (Brevet) Albert Crowther			
1999	Major General Robert W. McDonald			
2000	Major General Elmer Stephens			
2000	Major General Henry C. Smyth			
2000	Chief Warrant Officer Lewis O. King		Texas Medal of Merit	
2001	Colonel Louis A. Howard			
2001	Chief Warrant Officer James Berry			
2002	Lieutenant General (Brevet) William E. Murphy			
2002	Command Sergeant Major Billie S. Abernathy			
2002	Command Sergeant Major Vernon Day			
2002	Chief Master Sergeant Bobby D. Taylor			
2003	Major General Fred Ellis			
2003	Chief Warrant Officer Curtis Daniel			
2003	Chief Master Sergeant Arthur Fernandez			
2004	Brigadier General John C. L. Scribner		Established Texas Military Forces Museum	
2004	Chief Warrant Officer Four Joe Duncum			
2004	Chief Master Sergeant William M. Maginot			
2005	None			
2006	Brigadier General (Brevet) Reese L. Harrison Jr.			
2006	Colonel William R. Furr			
2007	Lieutenant General (Retired) Daniel James III			
2007	Major General (Retired) Reynaldo Sanchez			
2007	Chief Master Sergeant Deritha M. Ceaser			
2008	Civilian Barbara J. Crayton			
2008	Lieutenant General Don O. Daniel			
2008	Major General Belisario D.J. Flores			
2008	Colonel John S. “Rip” Ford			
2008	Captain Martin D. Higgins			
2008	Lieutenant Colonel Albert C. Lloyd Jr			
2009	Lieutenant General Fred L. Walker		Italian campaign (World War II)	
2010	None			
2011	None			
2012	None			
2013	None			
2014	Major General Charles L. "Rex" Driggers			
2014	Major General Robert L. Halverson			
2014	Chief Master Sergeant Harold L. Higgins			
2014	Command Sergeant Major Clyde Worrell			
2015	Colonel Harold H. Blackshear			
2015	Command Sergeant Major Margaret "Maggie" McCormick			
2015	Master Sergeant Theresa Billeck-Zuniga			
2016	Chief Master Sergeant Johnny D. Jones			
2016	Sergeant Major Elwood H. Imken			
2017	Major General Jerry D. Icenhower			
2017	Command Chief Master Sergeant Horace E. Hobbs Jr			
2018	Brigadier General Hugh J. Hall			
2018	Command Chief Master Sergeant William C. Sivells			

== See also ==
- Texas Ranger Hall of Fame and Museum
- Awards and decorations of the Texas government
- Texas Military Forces
- Texas Military Department
- List of conflicts involving the Texas Military
- Awards and decorations of the Texas government
