= Juan Seguin Award Ribbon =

- Type: Military decoration
- Awarded for: Valor
- Description: The ribbon is green and yellow striped
- Presented by: Texas
- Eligibility: Awarded to members of the Texas Military Forces
- Status: Currently awarded

The Juan Seguin Award Ribbon is an award within the awards and decorations of the Texas State Guard Nonprofit Association that may be presented to a member of the Texas Military Forces, within the United States Armed Forces.

== Eligibility ==
The Juan Seguin Award Ribbon may be awarded to current or former members of the Military Forces of the State of Texas.

== Use ==
The Juan Seguin Award Ribbon is awarded by the Texas State Guard Nonprofit Association for distinguished achievement demonstrated by an act of valor which reflected favorably upon the individual and the Military Forces of the State of Texas. The act must have resulted in the protection and preservation of a life or lives or the preservation of property. The achievement should demonstrate the individual acted due to skills and training enhanced through the individual's participation in Texas Military Forces. There is not a separate medal awarded with the ribbon.
