= James M. Logan =

James Marion Logan
- Medal of Honor
- Born: December 19, 1920; McNeil, Texas, US
- Died: October 9, 1999 (aged 78)
- Burial place: Texas State Cemetery
- Military career
- Allegiance: United States
- Branch: United States Army
- Service years: 1936 - 1945
- Rank: Technical Sergeant
- Units: 3rd Battalion, 142nd Infantry Regiment, 36th Infantry Division
- Conflicts: World War II; Rome-Arno
- Awards: Medal of Honor; Distinguished Service Cross; Bronze Star Medal; Purple Heart; Texas Legislative Medal of Honor; Hall of Honor

James Marion Logan (December 19, 1920 – October 9, 1999) was an American and former National Guard soldier who was a recipient of the United States military's highest decoration—the Medal of Honor—for his actions in World War II.

Logan joined the Texas National Guard from Luling, Texas in 1936, at the age of 15. By 9 September 1943, he was serving as a Sergeant in the 142nd Infantry Regiment, 36th Infantry Division. On that day, he participated in the Allied landings near Salerno, Italy. Logan single-handedly captured a German machine gun emplacement and later killed an enemy sniper. For these actions, he was awarded the Medal of Honor ten months later, on July 5, 1944.

Logan reached the rank of technical sergeant before leaving the Army in March and then National Guard in May 1945. He was inducted into the Texas Military Hall of Honor in 1982, and awarded the Texas Legislative Medal of Honor on May 30, 1997. He died at age 78 on October 9, 1999, and was buried at the Texas State Cemetery in Austin, Texas.

== Medal of Honor citation ==
Sergeant Logan's official Medal of Honor citation reads:

For conspicuous gallantry and intrepidity at risk of life above and beyond the call of duty in action involving actual conflict on 9 September 1943 in the vicinity of Salerno, Italy. As a rifleman of an infantry company, Sgt. Logan landed with the first wave of the assault echelon on the beaches of the Gulf of Salerno, and after his company had advanced 800 yards inland and taken positions along the forward bank of an irrigation canal, the enemy began a serious counterattack from positions along a rock wall which ran parallel with the canal about 200 yards further inland. Voluntarily exposing himself to the fire of a machinegun located along the rock wall, which sprayed the ground so close to him that he was splattered with dirt and rock splinters from the impact of the bullets, Sgt. Logan killed the first 3 Germans as they came through a gap in the wall. He then attacked the machinegun. As he dashed across the 200 yards of exposed terrain a withering stream of fire followed his advance. Reaching the wall, he crawled along the base, within easy reach of the enemy crouched along the opposite side, until he reached the gun. Jumping up, he shot the 2 gunners down, hurdled the wall, and seized the gun. Swinging it around, he immediately opened fire on the enemy with the remaining ammunition, raking their flight and inflicting further casualties on them as they fled. After smashing the machinegun over the rocks, Sgt. Logan captured an enemy officer and private who were attempting to sneak away. Later in the morning, Sgt. Logan went after a sniper hidden in a house about 150 yards from the company. Again the intrepid Sgt. ran a gauntlet of fire to reach his objective. Shooting the lock off the door, Sgt. Logan kicked it in and shot the sniper who had just reached the bottom of the stairs. The conspicuous gallantry and intrepidity which characterized Sgt. Logan's exploits proved a constant inspiration to all the men of his company, and aided materially in insuring the success of the beachhead at Salerno.

== Texas Legislative Medal of Honor ==
James Logan was the first recipient of the Texas Legislative Medal of Honor on May 30, 1997

== Awards and decorations ==

Badge	Combat Infantryman Badge		
1st row	Medal of Honor	Distinguished Service Cross	Bronze Star Medal
2nd row	Purple Heart	Army Good Conduct Medal	American Defense Service Medal
3rd row	American Campaign Medal	European–African–Middle Eastern Campaign Medalwith one campaign star	World War II Victory Medal
Unit awards	Presidential Unit Citation		

Civilian Awards

Texas Legislative Medal of Honor

== See also ==
- List of Medal of Honor recipients
