= Jack L. Knight =

- Born: May 29, 1917; Garner, Texas
- Died: February 2, 1945 (aged 27) near LoiKang, Burma
- Burial place: Holders Chapel Cemetery, Cool, Texas
- Military career
- Allegiance: United States of America
- Branch: United States Army
- Service years: 1940 – 1945
- Rank: First Lieutenant
- Unit: 124th Cavalry Regiment
- Conflicts: World War II
- Awards: Medal of Honor; Texas Medal of Honor; Hall of Honor

Jack Llewellyn Knight (May 29, 1917 – February 2, 1945) was an American National Guard officer who was killed in action during World War II. He was awarded the United States highest military decoration for valor, the Medal of Honor, posthumously. He was inducted to the Texas Military Hall of Honor in 1980, awarded the Texas Legislative Medal of Honor posthumously on May 31, 1999.

== Biography ==
Knight was born in Garner, Texas. He graduated from Weatherford Junior College, in Weatherford, Texas, in 1938, and joined the Texas National Guard with his brother Curtis on November 18, 1940.

=== World War II ===
Knight served as a first lieutenant in the 124th Cavalry Regiment, Mars Task Force. On February 2, 1945, near LoiKang, Burma, Knight single-handedly destroyed two Japanese pillboxes. Despite being wounded, he led his rifle platoon in an attack on other enemy positions but was again wounded, this time fatally. For his heroic actions, he was awarded the Medal of Honor posthumously four months later, on June 25, 1945.

Knight, aged 27 at his death, was buried at the Holders Chapel Cemetery in Cool, Texas.

== Medal of Honor ==
=== Medal of Honor citation ===
First Lieutenant Knight's official Medal of Honor citation reads:

He led his cavalry troop against heavy concentrations of enemy mortar, artillery, and small arms fire. After taking the troop's objective and while making preparations for a defense, he discovered a nest of Japanese pillboxes and foxholes to the right front. Preceding his men by at least 10 feet, he immediately led an attack. Single-handedly he knocked out 2 enemy pillboxes and killed the occupants of several foxholes. While attempting to knock out a third pillbox, he was struck and blinded by an enemy grenade. Although unable to see, he rallied his platoon and continued forward in the assault on the remaining pillboxes. Before the task was completed he fell mortally wounded. 1st Lt. Knight's gallantry and intrepidity were responsible for the successful elimination of most of the Japanese positions and served as an inspiration to officers and men of his troop.

== Texas legislative Medal of Honor ==
He was awarded the Texas Legislative Medal of Honor in May 1999. The medal was given to sister who was to take it to his brother Curtis who also fought in the battle.

== Awards and decorations ==

1st row	Medal of Honor	Purple Heart	American Defense Service Medal
2nd row	American Campaign Medal	European–African–Middle Eastern Campaign Medalwith one campaign star	World War II Victory Medal
Civilian Awards	Texas Legislative Medal of Honor		

== Building Dedication ==
Jack L Knight was honored with a building named after him at Weatherford College on November 11, 2014.

== See also ==
- List of Medal of Honor recipients
- List of Medal of Honor recipients for World War II
