= James Bowie Award Ribbon =

Award given by the State Guard Association of Texas

- Type: Military decoration
- Awarded for: Service
- Description: The ribbon is blue, white, yellow and green striped
- Presented by: Texas
- Eligibility: Awarded to members of the Texas Military Forces
- Status: Currently awarded.

The James Bowie Award Ribbon is an award given by the State Guard Association of Texas. It may be presented to a member of the Texas Military Forces within the United States Armed Forces.

== Eligibility ==
The James Bowie Award Ribbon may be awarded to active, retired, or honorably discharged members of the Texas State Guard as well as civilians.

== Use ==
The James Bowie Award Ribbon is awarded by the State Guard Association of Texas for meritorious achievement and service in furthering the aims of the Texas Military Department, the State of Texas, or the Texas State Guard. The nominee has demonstrated humanitarianism through the individual's generosity of time and self and whose distinguished service was conducted with the highest military standard of leadership, organizational ability, and skills for the betterment of others.

The actions of the nominee must include three years of service to the Texas Military Forces or the Association. The second and additional receipt of this award is indicated by a silver star. There is not a separate medal awarded with the ribbon.
