= Daniel James III =

United States Air Force general

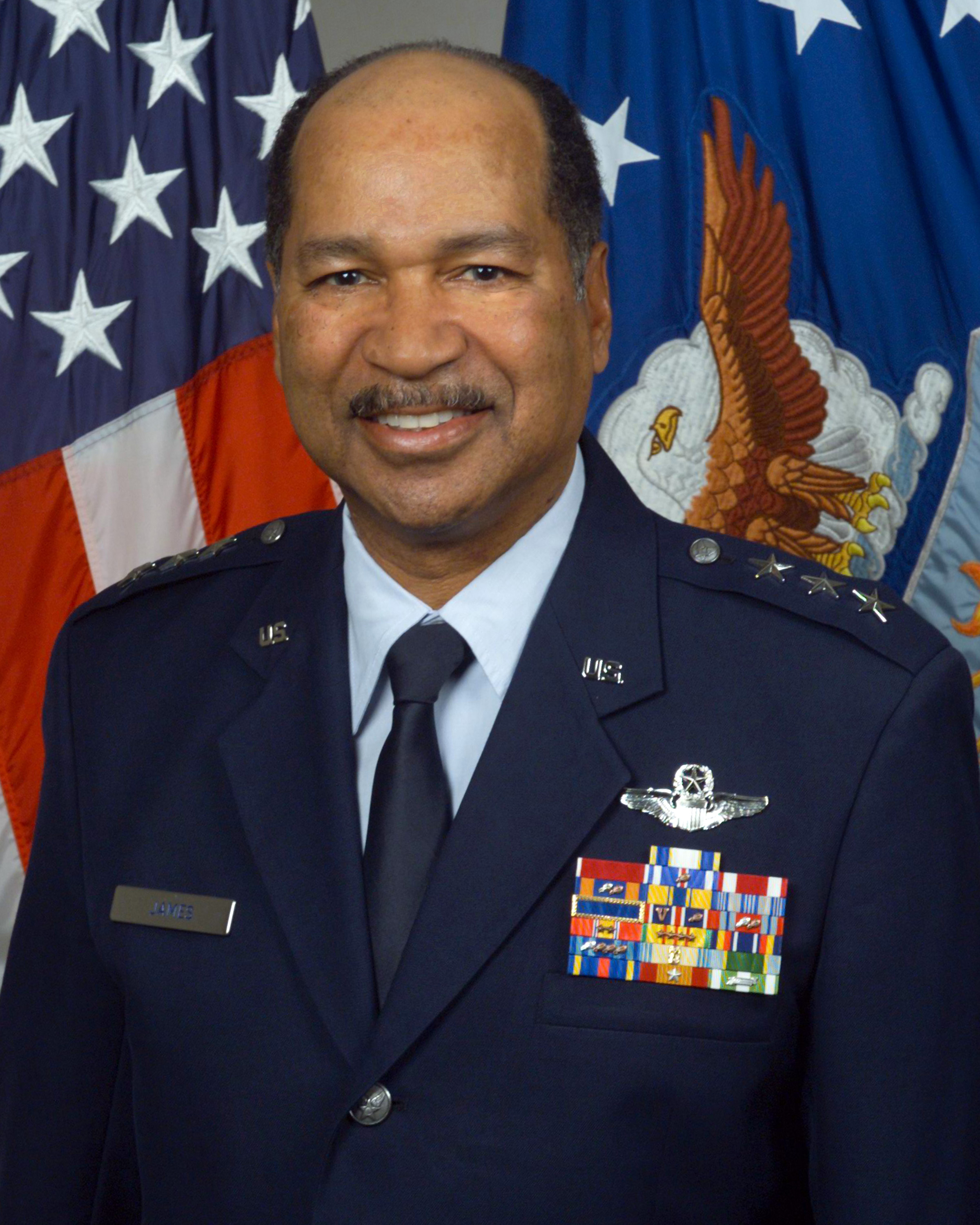
- Lieutenant General Daniel James III
- Born: September 7, 1945; Tuskegee, Alabama, U.S.
- Died: August 1, 2017 (aged 71); Washington, D.C., U.S.
- Relatives: General Daniel James Jr. (father)
- Military career
- Allegiance: United States
- Branch: United States Air Force
- Service years: 1968–2006
- Rank: Lieutenant General
- Commands: Air National Guard; Texas National Guard; 149th Operations Group; Director, Air National Guard
- Conflicts: Vietnam War
- Awards: Air Force Distinguished Service Medal (2); Legion of Merit; Distinguished Flying Cross (2)

Daniel James III (September 7, 1945 – August 1, 2017) was a lieutenant general in the United States Air Force who served as the director of the Air National Guard from June 3, 2002, to May 20, 2006.

== Biography ==
James was born in Tuskegee, Alabama, in 1945., his father was Air Force General Daniel "Chappie" James Jr. He held a Bachelor of Arts degree in psychology from the University of Arizona, Tucson, and graduated from the Air Command and Staff College in 1981 and the National Security Management Course in 1992.

James flew 500 combat hours in Southeast Asia and earned two Distinguished Flying Crosses. He was the first African American to become the director of the Air National Guard. He retired from the United States Air Force in June 2006.

He died on August 1, 2017, of congestive heart failure. He received both Baptist and Catholic funeral services and was interred at Arlington National Cemetery.

== Major awards and decorations ==

Command Pilot Badge
Air Force Distinguished Service Medal with oak leaf cluster
Legion of Merit	Distinguished Flying Cross with oak leaf cluster	Meritorious Service Medal
Air Medal with silver and bronze oak leaf clusters	Air Force Commendation Medal	Air Force Achievement Medal
Air Force Presidential Unit Citation	Air Force Outstanding Unit Award with "V" device and oak leaf cluster	Combat Readiness Medal with silver and bronze oak leaf clusters
National Defense Service Medal with two campaign stars	Vietnam Service Medal with four bronze stars	Global War on Terrorism Service Medal
Air Force Longevity Service Award with silver and three bronze oak leaf clusters	Armed Forces Reserve Medal with gold hourglass device	Small Arms Expert Marksmanship Ribbon
Air Force Training Ribbon	Republic of Vietnam Gallantry Cross with Silver Star	Vietnam Campaign Medal

Other awards

- Order of the Sword (United States) # 221
- Texas Military Hall of Honor

== Assignments ==
- June 1968 – June 1969, student, undergraduate pilot training, Williams Air Force Base, Arizona
- June 1969 – August 1970, forward air controller, Cam Ranh Bay Air Base, South Vietnam
- August 1970 – July 1972, squadron instructor pilot, Williams AFB, Arizona
- July 1972 – February 1973, squadron flight training class commander, Williams AFB, Arizona
- February 1973 – December 1973, air operations staff officer, Headquarters U.S. Air Force, Washington, D.C.
- December 1973 – June 1974, U.S. Air Force conversion training course, George AFB, California
- June 1974 – May 1975, 421st TFS squadron instructor pilot and assistant flight commander, Udorn Royal Thai AFB, Thailand
- May 1975 – August 1976, 64th FWS Aggressor instructor pilot, Nellis AFB, Nevada
- August 1976 – September 1978, 65th FWS Aggressor instructor pilot and squadron flight commander, Nellis AFB, Nevada
- September 1978 – September 1979, weapons tactics officer, 149th Tactical Fighter Group, Texas Air National Guard, Kelly AFB, Texas
- September 1979 – March 1982, group pilot, later, unit pilot, 182nd Tactical Fighter Squadron, Kelly AFB, Texas
- March 1982 – December 1983, unit commander, 182nd Tactical Fighter Squadron, Kelly AFB, Texas
- December 1983 – October 1988, Commander, A flight, 182nd Tactical Fighter Squadron, Kelly AFB, Texas
- October 1988 – October 1989, pilot, C flight, 182nd Tactical Fighter Squadron, Kelly AFB, Texas
- October 1989 – December 1992, command post assistant officer-in-charge, later, command post officer-in-charge, 149th Tactical Fighter Group, Kelly AFB, Texas
- December 1992 – December 1994, Vice Commander, 149th Tactical Fighter Wing, Kelly AFB, Texas
- December 1994 – November 1995, Commander, 149th Operations Group, Kelly AFB, Texas
- November 1995 – June 2002, Adjutant General, Headquarters Texas National Guard, Austin
- June 2002 – 2006, Director, Air National Guard, Arlington, Virginia

Military offices
Preceded by Paul A. Weaver Jr.	Director of the United States Air National Guard; 2002–2006	Succeeded by Craig R. McKinley
