= Texas Military Forces Museum =

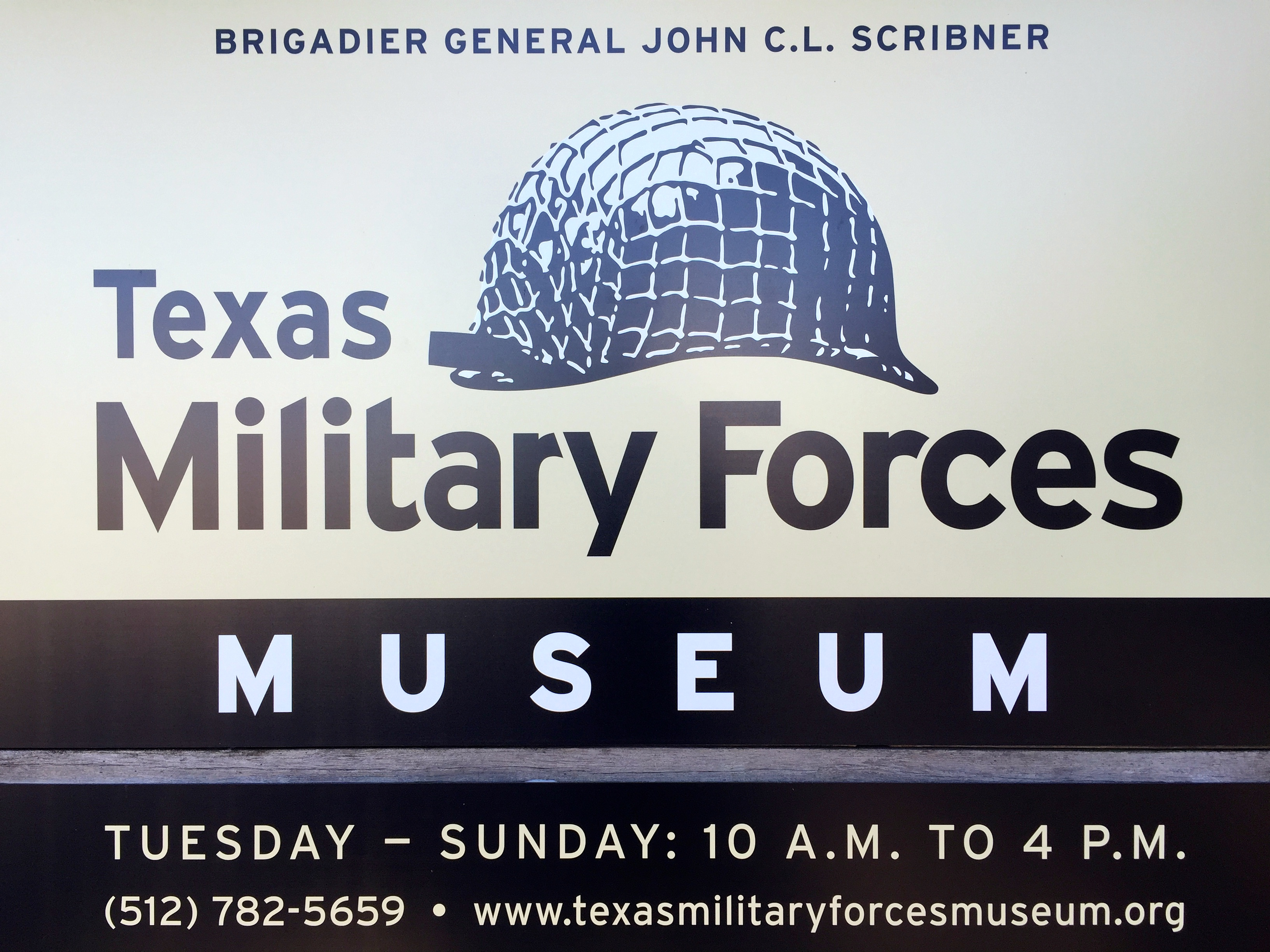
- Sign outside the Texas Military Forces Museum
- Established: 1986; opened November 14, 1992
- Location: Building Six; Camp Mabry, Austin, Texas; 30°18′42.173″N 97°45′38.338″W
- Type: Military Museum
- Executive director: Texas Military Department Garrison Command
- Director: Jeff Hunt
- Curators: Lisa Sharik; Edward Zepeda
- Website: Official website

The Texas Military Forces Museum (officially the Brigadier General John C.L. Scribner Texas Military Forces Museum) is a history museum in Austin, Texas. It is hosted by the Texas Military Department at Camp Mabry and is part of the United States Army Historical Program.

It is open to the public Tuesday-Sunday from 10am-4pm CST. Admission is free. Access to Camp Mabry requires a government issued identification, such as a driver's license, passport, or common access card. Approximately 159,000 tourists visited from 1992-2007.

The museum's stated mission is "to tell the story of the Texas Military Forces from 1823 through the present and into the future, support the mission of the Texas Military Forces, honor our veterans, educate our fellow citizens, promote esprit de corps among the men and women of the Texas Military Forces, and inspire youth to serve."

As of 2018, the 45,000 sqft museum has indoor and outdoor galleries featuring 24 major exhibits, which includes over 10,000 artifacts, 36 vehicles, 8 dioramas, 16 macro environments, 16 macro artifacts, and over 50 uniformed mannequins. The library and archive features over 10,000 books and 20,000 photos available for research.

== History ==
The Texas Military Forces Museum began in 1986 with an effort directed by Adjutant General of Texas Major General James T. Dennis and led by Brigadier General John C. L. Scribner to establish a museum and archival collection for the history of Texas Military Forces. In 1987, United States Army Center of Military History provided authorization for its location at Camp Mabry, a jointly owned federal-state military installation in Austin, Texas that serves as the Texas Military Department headquarters. In 1990, Adjutant General of Texas Major General William C. Wilson designated Building 6 for its location, a mess originally constructed in 1918. It officially opened to the public on November 14, 1992.

- Approximately 159,000 tourists visited from 1992–2007.
- The museum's namesake was dedicated to Brigadier General John C. L. Scribner on February 4, 2006.
- From 2008–2012 the museum underwent an extensive, $6M (equivalent to $7.1 in 2018) renovation which brought the museum up to code and added exhibits.
- It was further renovated throughout 2019, adding a new main entrance, revised access for the Hall of Honor, and upgraded the loading docks and offices.

== Research and collections ==
The library and archive features over 10,000 books/periodicals and 20,000 photos available for research.

=== Notable collections ===
- World War I service records
- World War II 36th Infantry Division Roster

== Exhibits ==
The museum is divided into six sections, which includes four indoor galleries, one outdoor gallery, and one conference center totalling 10,000 artifacts, 36 vehicles, eight dioramas, 16 macro environments, 16 macro artifacts, and over 50 uniformed mannequins.

=== Armor Row and Artillery Park ===
An outdoor exhibit that features more than 36 tanks and artillery pieces.

Additional aircraft, helicopters and artillery pieces are located around the Camp Mabry parade field.

=== Gallery 1 ===
- 1823 to 1859
- Birth of the Texas Militia
- Texas Revolution
- Republic of Texas
- Mexican War
- Texas Rangers in the Texas—Indian Wars
- Texas Militia in the Crisis of 1850

=== Gallery 2 ===
- 1860 to 1918
- American Civil War
- Re-establishment of Texas Military Forces
- Texas Rangers in the Texas—Indian Wars
- Origins of the Texas Army National Guard, 1870-1898
- Spanish-American War
- Bandit War and Mexican Border War
- World War I

=== Gallery 3 ===
- 1919 to present
- Between the World Wars
- World War II
- Cold War and creation of the Texas Air National Guard
- 49th Armored Division
- Texas missions
- United States missions
- War on terror

=== Great Hall ===
- Twin Sisters
- Lost Battalion
- Captured Enemy Equipment: Hetzer, Sd.Kfz. 251, Volkswagen Kübelwagen, 5 cm Pak 38, 10.5 cm leFH 18M
- Tanks: M4A3 105 (VHSS) Sherman, M3A1 Stuart
- Aircraft: F-16 Cockpit Egress Trainer, OH-58 Helicopter, OH-23 Helicopter, Taylorcraft L-2 Grasshopper, Republic F-84 Thunderjet
- Weapons: Hotchkiss M1914
- Equipment: Jeep, DUKW, Air Force Mobile Radio Relay Station

=== Hall of Honor ===
The museum hosts the Texas Military Department's Hall of Honor. It is both an exhibit with a digital kiosk that showcases inductee biographies, and an eponymous conference center that may be rented for conventions or banquets.

== Funding ==
The Texas Military Forces Museum is funded through multiple avenues. The building, Building 6, is federally funded. Operations, including salaries and supplies, are state funded. The Texas Military Department also maintains a memorandum of agreement with the Texas Military Forces Historical Foundation, a non-federal, non-profit 501(c)3 that raises funds through donations. The foundation supports the museum as requested and has no authority regarding operations, artifacts or exhibits. The museum also accepts individual donations an offers a gift shop.

== Programs and events ==
The museum regularly hosts reenactments, speakers, mixers, dances, and other special events that can be found on the calendar on the museum website.

It also hosts regular annual events:

- Hand on History — a unique look at items kept in the vault
- Battleground 1863 — a Civil War reenactment traditionally held in March that focuses on weapons, equipment, and tactics of both sides of the Civil War.
- Muster Day — a World War II reenactment held in-conjunction with the Texas Military Department Open House
- Close Assault — held on the weekends of Memorial Day and Veterans Day, focusing on the weapons, equipment, and tactics of the 36th Infantry Division during World War II or the 25th Infantry Division during the Vietnam War, as well as their respective opponents
- Over There — focusing on the history of the 36th Infantry Division during World War I

== Volunteering ==
Volunteering is encouraged and a competitive internship program is available for students looking for experience in the Museum field.

== Gallery ==
Hall of Honor conference room entrance

Twin Sisters in the Great Hall

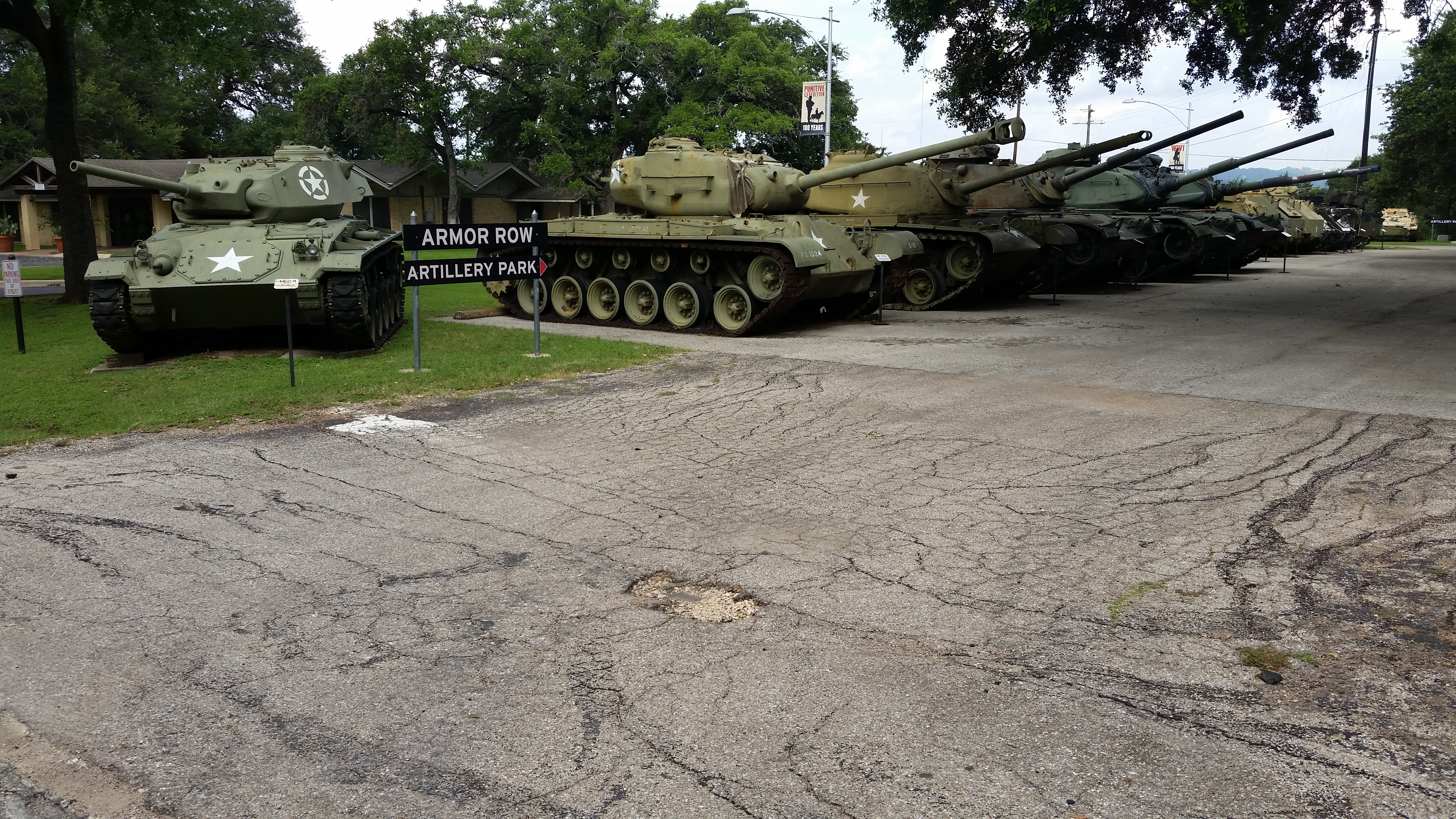
Armor Row

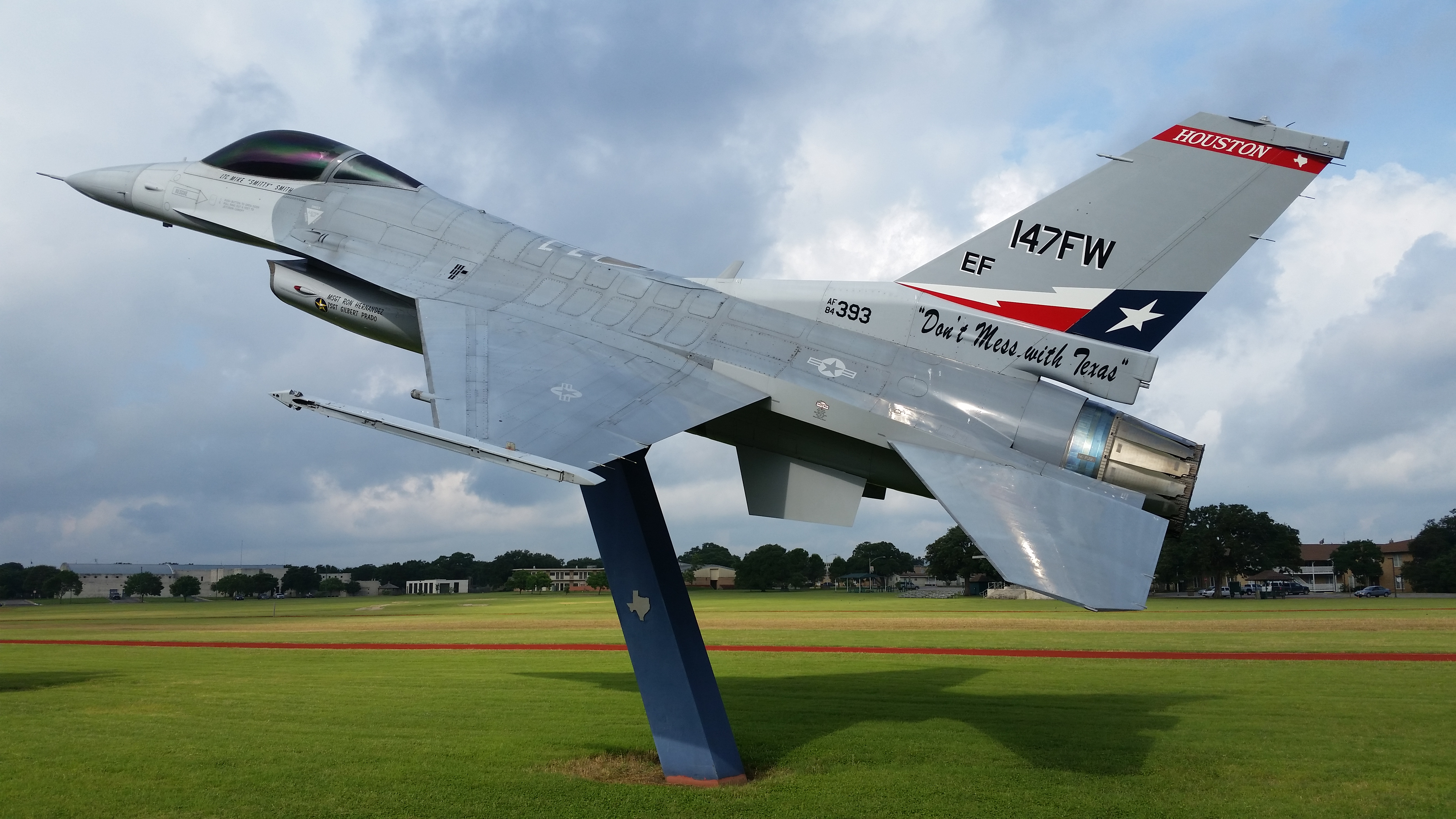
F-16 Falcon

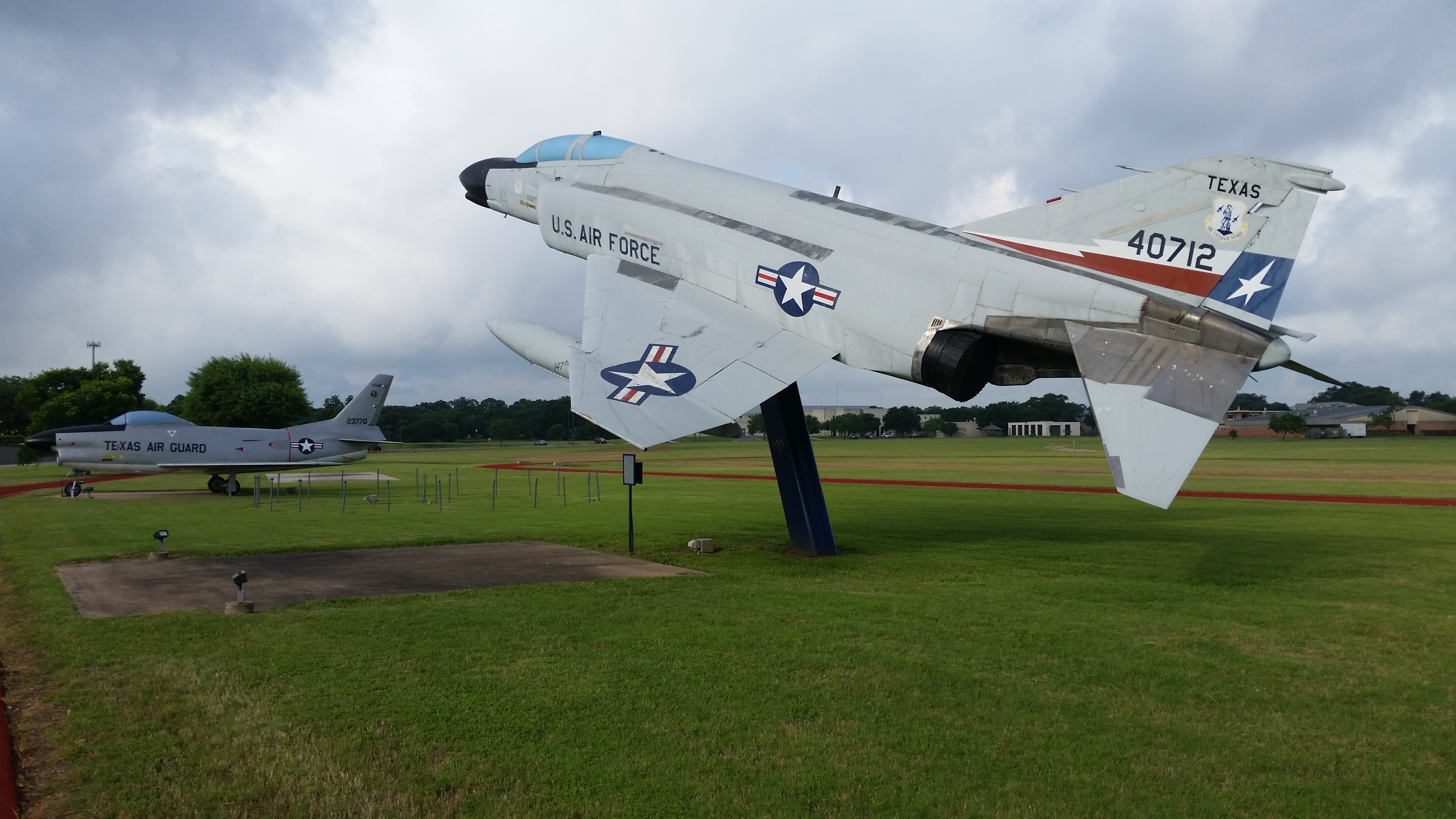
F-4 Phantom, F-86D

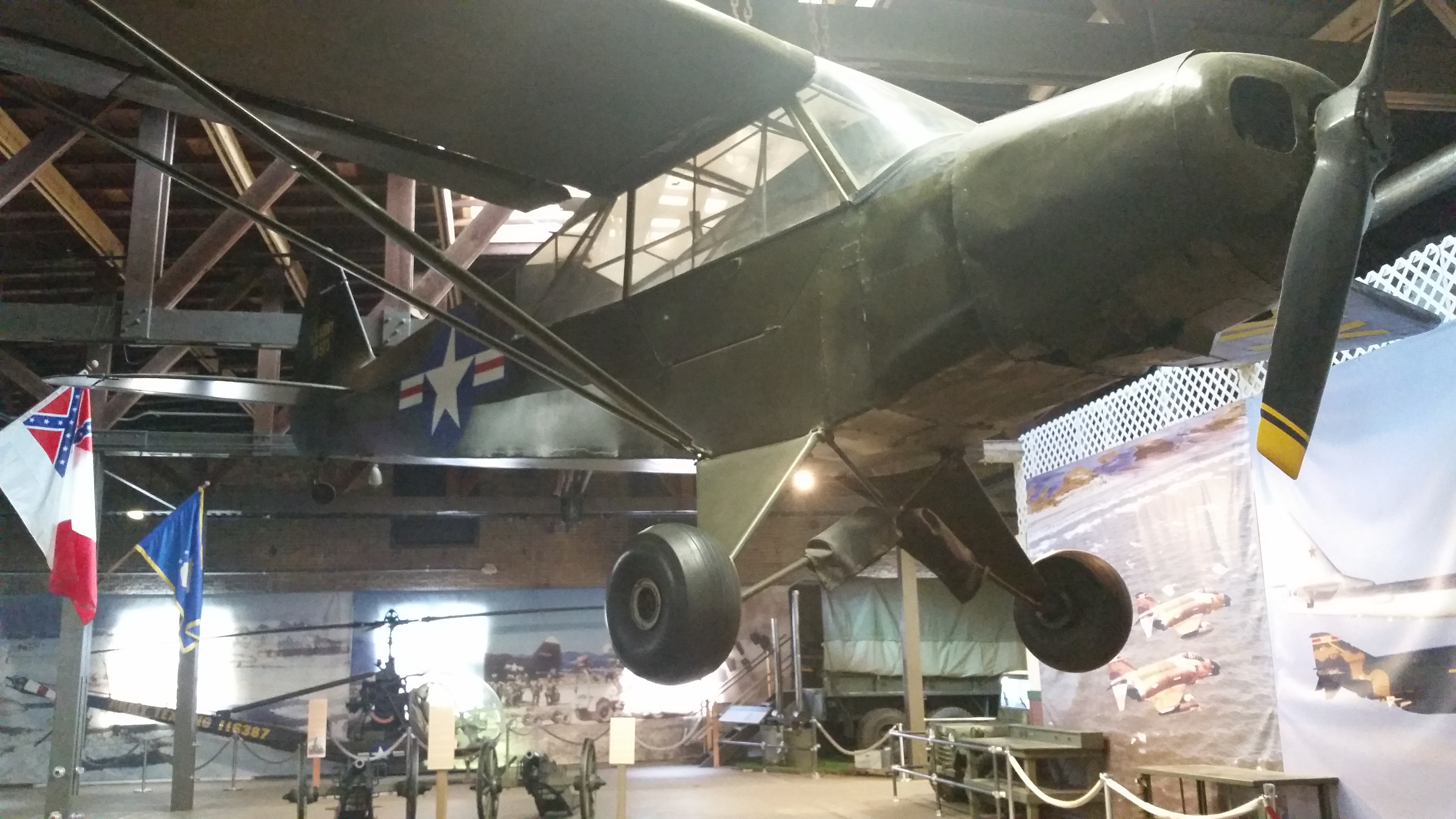
L-21A, OH-23B

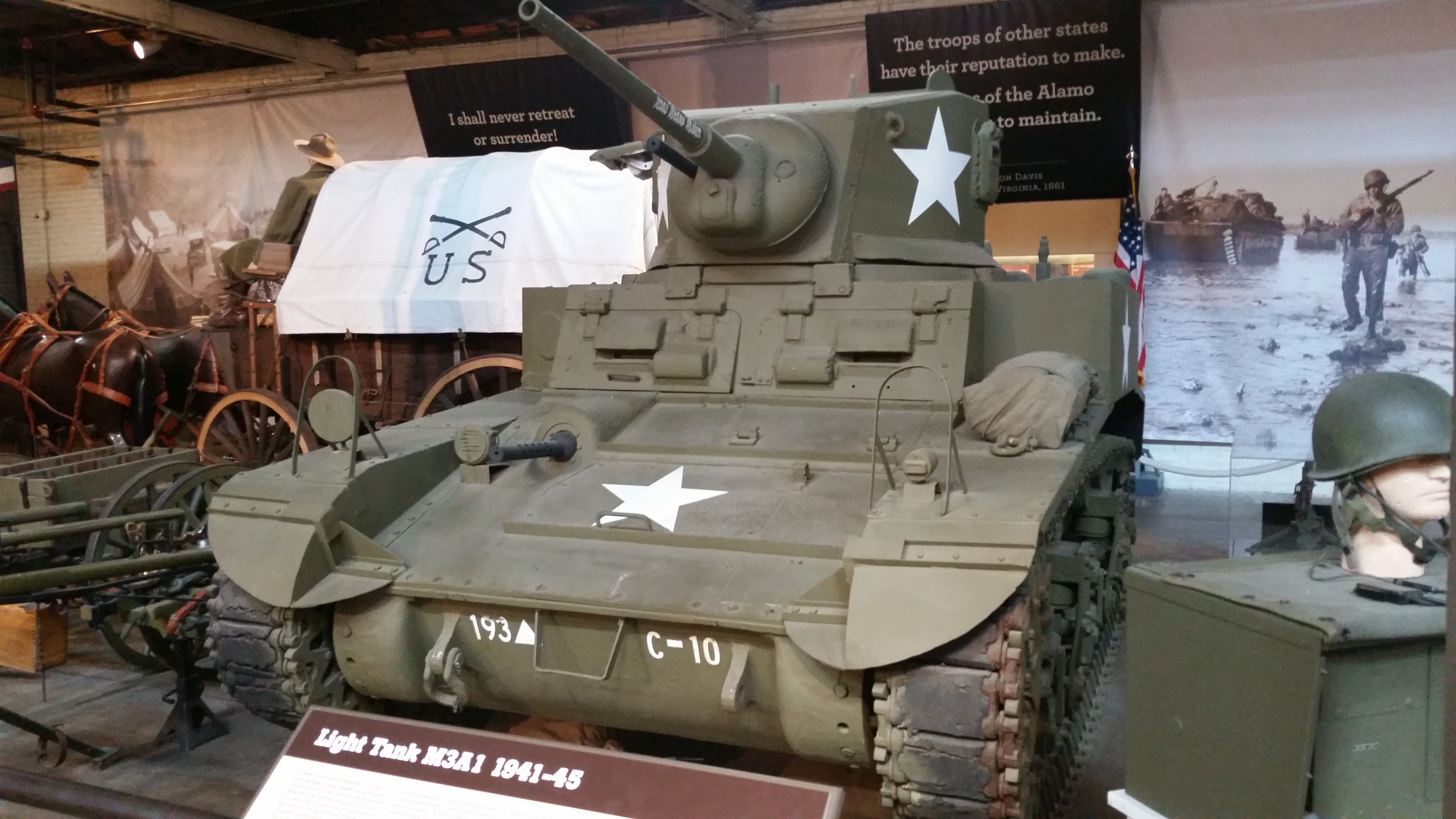
M3A1

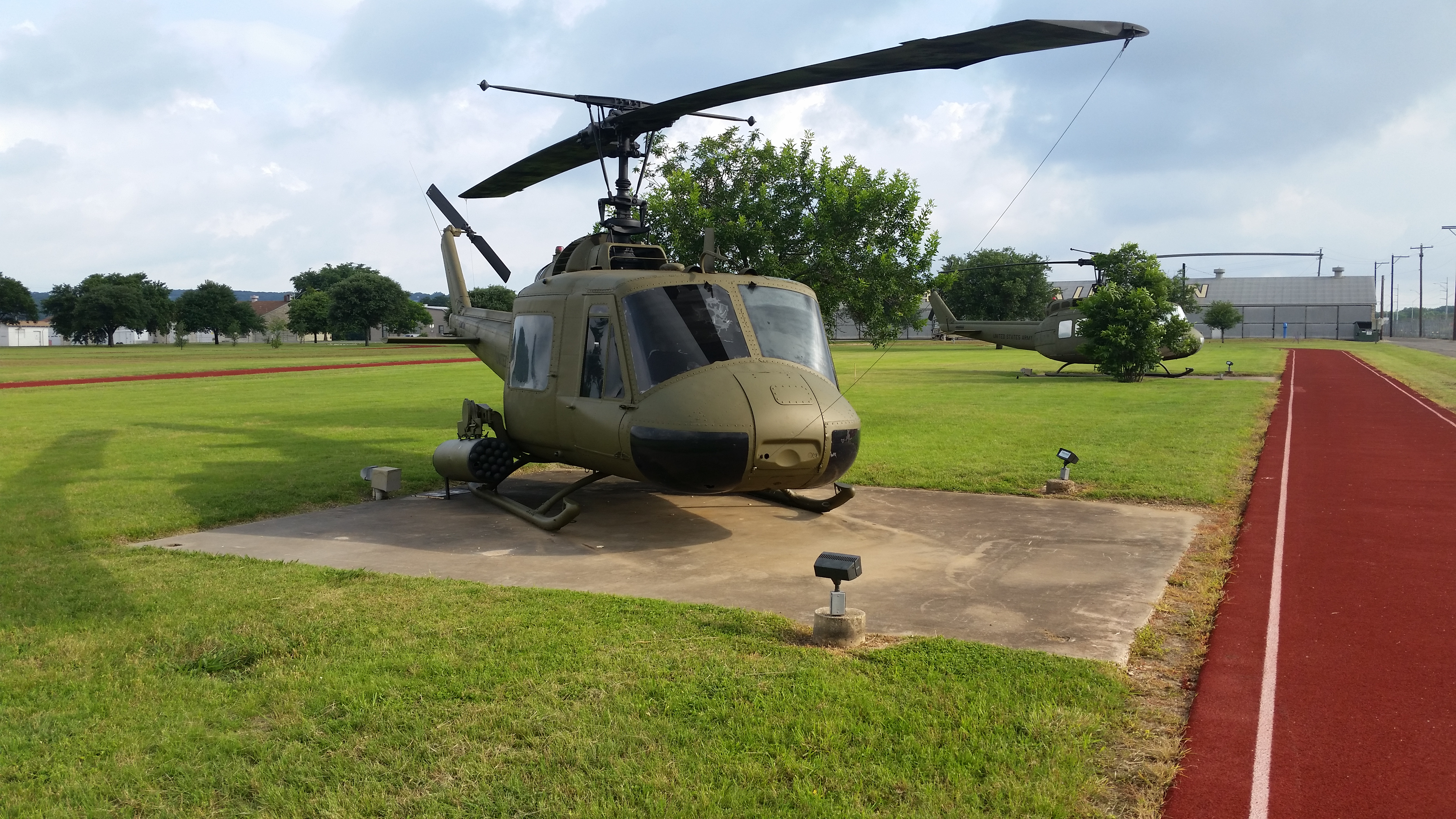
UH-1 Iroquois

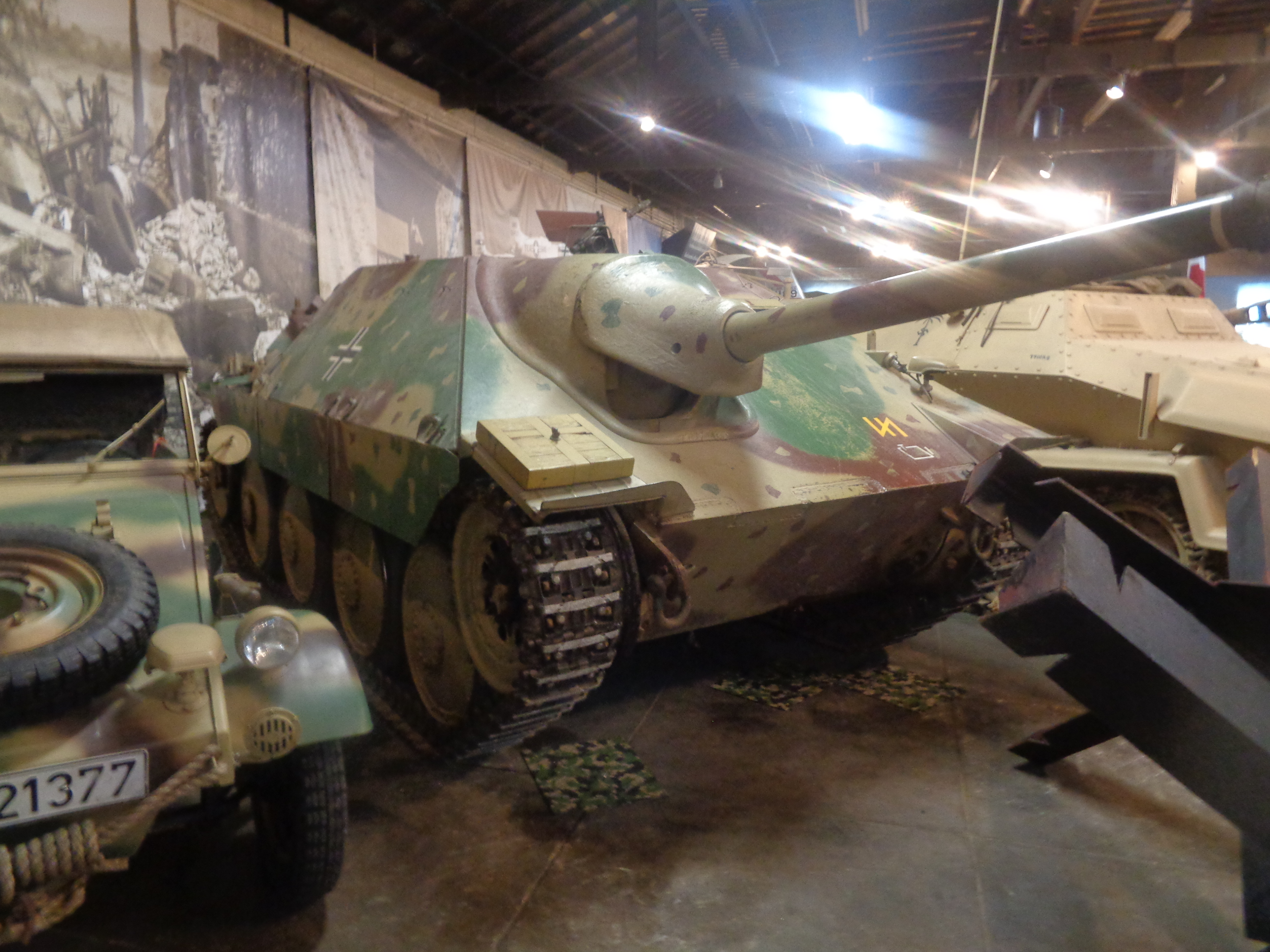
Jagdpanzer 38(t) Hetzer

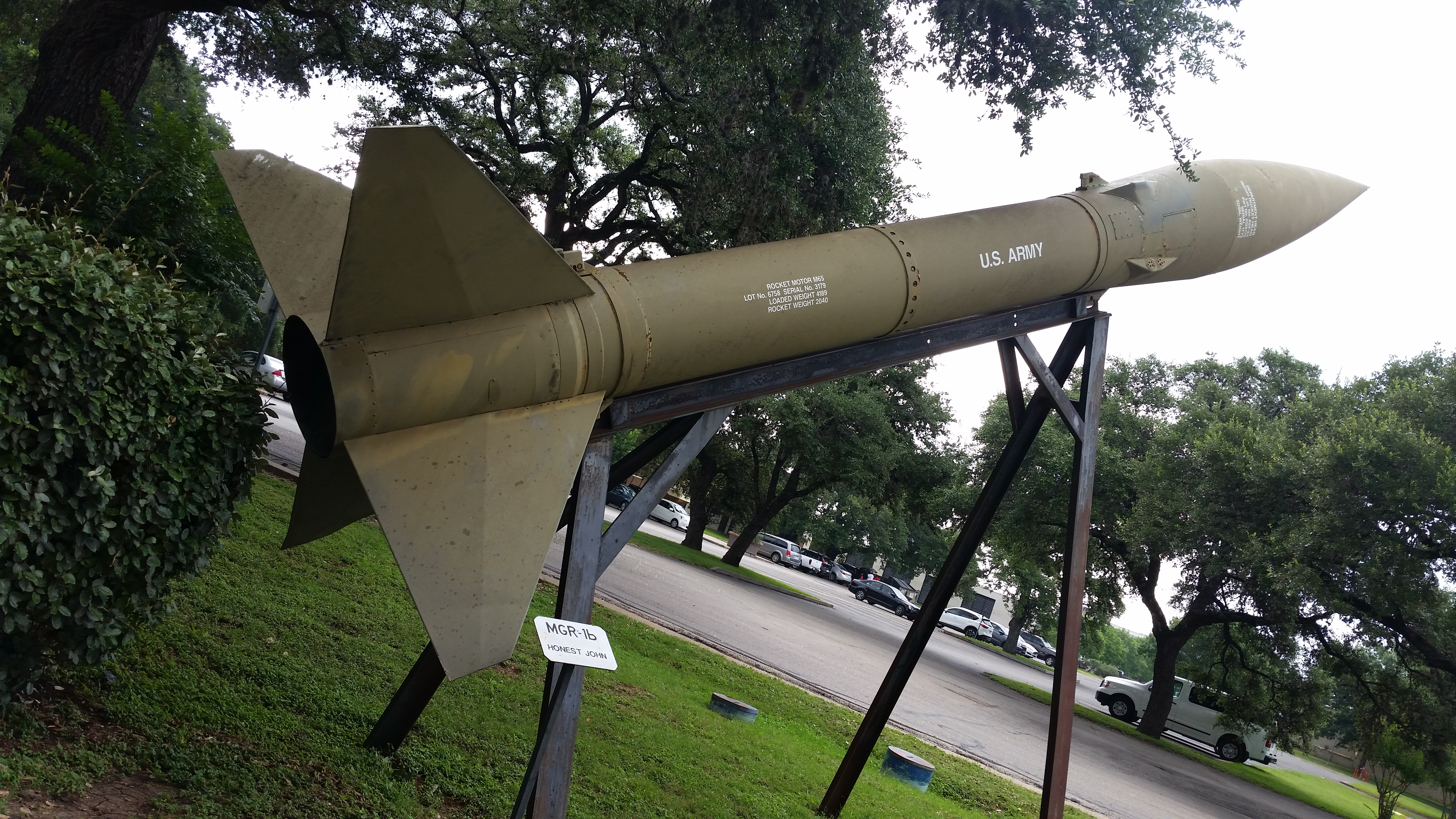
MGR-1, "Honest John", the first nuclear surface-to-surface rocket

== See also ==
- Texas Military Hall of Honor
- Texas Ranger Hall of Fame and Museum
- Texas State Cemetery
- Texas Military Department
- Bullock Texas State History Museum
- List of museums in Central Texas
