= Camp Mabry =

Military base in Austin, Texas

Coordinates: 30.3185°N 97.7614°W

- Camp Mabry Historic District
- U.S. National Register of Historic Places
- U.S. Historic district
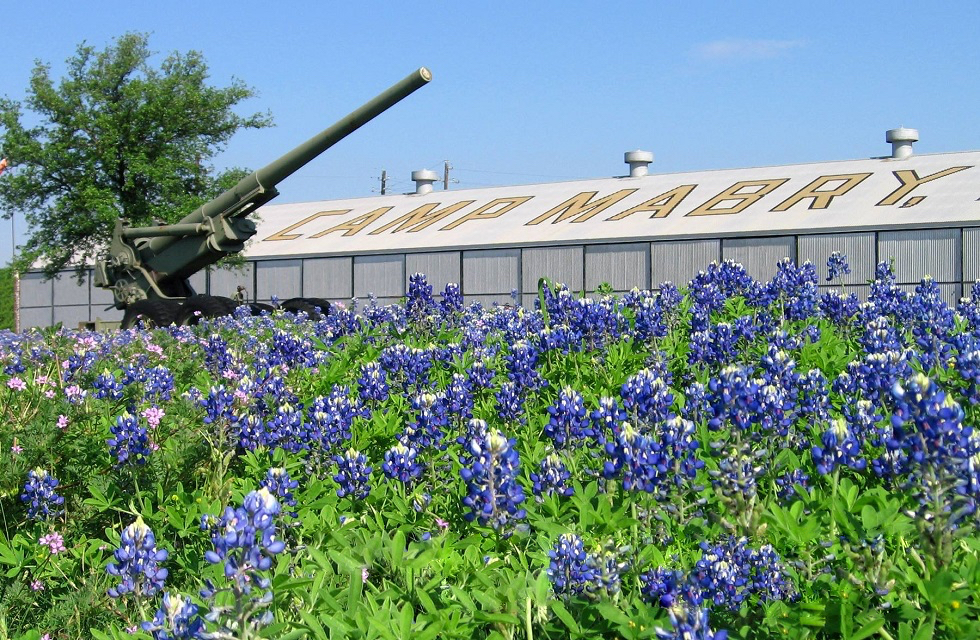

- Location within Texas
- Location: 2210 W. 35th St; Austin, Texas; United States
- Area: 375 acres (152 ha)
- Built: 1892
- Architectural style: International Style, rustic CCC
- NRHP reference No.: 96000967
- Added to NRHP: 30 August 1996

Camp Mabry (ICAO: KATT) is a military installation in Austin, Texas, housing the headquarters of the Texas Military Department, Texas Military Forces, and Texas Military Forces Museum. Established in 1892, Camp Mabry is the third-oldest active military installation in Texas, behind Fort Sam Houston and Fort Bliss. It was named for Brigadier General Woodford H. Mabry, the Adjutant General of Texas when the camp was founded. The camp was added to the National Register of Historic Places in 1996.

== Military functions ==
Texas Military Department HQ, Building 8

Camp Mabry's Building 8 is the home to the Texas Military Department headquarters which contains the Joint Force Headquarters of the Texas Military Forces and office of the Adjutant General of Texas. It is also home to Texas Army National Guard, Texas Air National Guard and Texas State Guard headquarters and hosts the Texas Military Forces Museum.

Camp Mabry has served a variety of military purposes since its establishment. It was used as a mobilization area during the Spanish–American War, as headquarters for the Texas Defense Guard during World War II, and as a training facility for the Texas DPS and the Texas Rangers until 1953. It has also hosted the Texas National Guard's State Officer Candidate School since 1959. Camp Mabry currently hosts other branches of the Reserve components of the United States Armed Forces from the United States Army Reserve, the United States Navy Reserve Navy Operations Support Center (NOSC Austin) and the United States Marine Corps Reserve.

== Site ==
Camp Mabry's original 85-acre (34 ha) site, overlooking the Colorado River three miles (5 km) northwest of downtown Austin, was donated by the city to the state in 1892. It was initially a literal "camp", a space in which the Texas Volunteer Guard encamped during the summers while hosting mock battles and demonstrations for the people of Austin. In 1909 the camp was greatly enlarged by the addition of 200 acres (81 ha) of land purchased by the federal government for use in training the state national guard. Other land gifts brought the camp to its present size of around 375 acres (152 ha) by 1911. The site now adjoins the west side of Mopac Expressway.

== Facilities ==
The first constructions at the camp were grandstands and a mess shed, funded by paid admissions to the historical reenactments and events held there. In 1915 an arsenal became the first permanent structure built onsite, allowing military equipment and weapons to be moved out of storage in the capitol building. During World War I the United States Army used the camp as a training site and built several barracks and administration buildings.

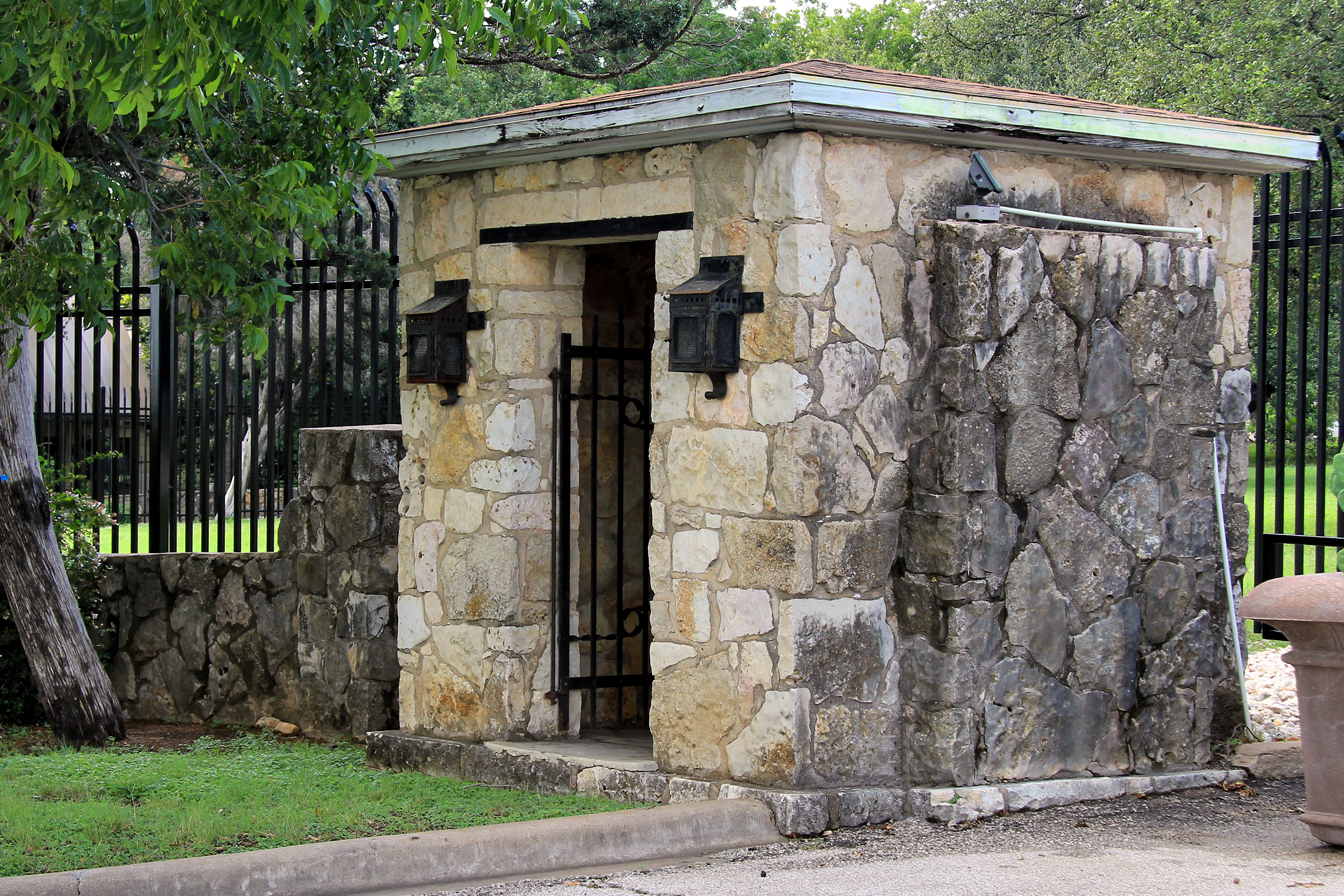
Guard house built by the Works Progress Administration

From 1935 to 1943, the Works Progress Administration (WPA), under the sponsorship of the Adjutant General Department of Texas, completed a $130,000 improvement project, of which the WPA provided $92,000 for labor. The WPA did necessary repairs and "other improvements to generally restore the useful value" of 15 buildings, built structures of native limestone that included rustic walls, entrance gates and guard post, a dam, arched bridges, drainage ditches, a flagpole base, cannon bases, workshops, warehouses and storage buildings. Infrastructure features included limestone culverts, head walls, and limestone or concrete sidewalks. They constructed roads and cleared, leveled, sodded, and drained the camp.

Other facilities include the 136th Regional Training Institute, state Combined Support Maintenance Shops, the armory of the 36th Infantry Division headquarters, a clinic, a parachute packing and storage facility, and additional storage buildings. In 1992 the Texas Military Forces Museum opened on the site.

Prior to the September 11th attacks, Camp Mabry's mile-long track that sits adjacent to Mopac was a popular destination for walkers and joggers, and the field within it was used by many youth sports teams. The track and field are still available for public use, though adult visitors must present a state or federal ID at the gate.

== Weather station ==
Camp Mabry has also operated an ICAO recognized weather station since 1898.

== Tenant units ==
=== United States Army Reserve ===
- 321st Military Intelligence Battalion

=== United States Navy Reserve ===
- Navy Operations Support Center (NOSC Austin)

=== United States Marine Corps Reserve ===
- Weapons Company, 1st Battalion, 23d Marines 4th Marine Division

=== Texas Army National Guard ===
- 36th Infantry Division
  - Headquarters and Headquarters Company
  - 36th Infantry Division Band
- 1st Battalion, 143rd Infantry Regiment
  - Headquarters and Headquarters Company
  - Company A, 1st Battalion, 143rd Infantry Regiment
- 294th Quartermaster Company
- 71st Theater Information Operations Group
  - 101st Information Operations Battalion
  - 102nd Information Operations Battalion

=== Texas Air National Guard ===
- Headquarters, Texas Air National Guard

=== Civil Air Patrol ===
- SWR-TX-351 Pegasus Composite Squadron

== See also ==
- Texas Military Forces
- Texas Military Department
- List of conflicts involving the Texas Military
- Awards and decorations of the Texas Military
