= Wilburn Hill King =

American politician

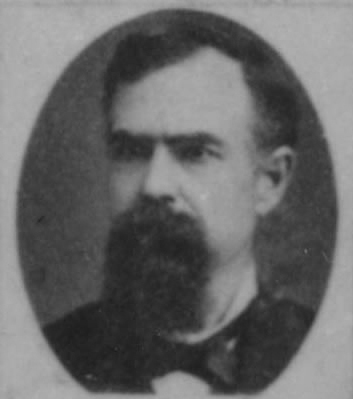
- King as a member of the Texas Legislature circa 1880
- Born: June 10, 1839; Culloden, Georgia
- Died: December 12, 1910 (aged 71); Sulphur Springs, Texas
- Burial place: Corsicana, Texas
- Military career
- Allegiance: Confederate States of America
- Branch: Confederate States Army
- Service years: 1861–1865
- Rank: Colonel, CSA; Assigned to duty as: Brigadier General
- Conflicts: American Civil War

Wilburn Hill King (June 10, 1839 – December 12, 1910) was a Confederate States Army colonel during the American Civil War (Civil War). He was assigned to duty as a brigadier general by General E. Kirby Smith but he was not officially appointed and confirmed to that grade.

King had been a lawyer and businessman in Warrensburg, Missouri at the outbreak of the Civil War. He promptly enlisted in the pro–Confederate Missouri State Guard. After being wounded at the Battle of Wilson's Creek, he was discharged and returned to Texas. There he enlisted as a private in the 18th Texas Infantry Regiment. In October 1861, he served as major and quartermaster of the division of Texas regiments which was being formed at that time. On May 13, 1862, he was elected major of the regiment. He progressed to lieutenant colonel and colonel in 1863.

On April 8, 1864, King's regiment, as part of Major General John G. Walker's division, helped rout three Union Army divisions at the Battle of Mansfield, where he was severely wounded. On April 16, 1864, General E. Kirby Smith, as the Confederate commander of the Trans-Mississippi Department, assigned King to duty as a brigadier general. The Confederate government took no action on the appointment and Confederate President Jefferson Davis did not officially appoint and nominate King to the rank of brigadier general. By the end of the war, King had acted as a general officer, leading brigades, and briefly Walker's division, for more than a year, but had not been legally promoted to a general officer's grade.

After fleeing to Mexico at the end of the war, and then operating a sugar plantation in Central America, King returned to Texas where he practiced law, was the mayor of Sulphur Springs, Texas, was a state representative and was Adjutant General of Texas from 1881 to 1891. After he retired as adjutant general, he concentrated on the affairs of the Masonic Order.

== Early life ==
Wilburn Hill King was born in Culloden, Georgia on June 10, 1839. His parents were Alexander and Mary (Douglas) King. King studied law and medicine at Americus, Georgia. He was a lawyer, prospector and businessman. He moved to Cass County, Texas in 1860 but he was in business at Warrensburg, Missouri when the Civil War began.

King married Lucy Furman in 1867.

== American Civil War service ==
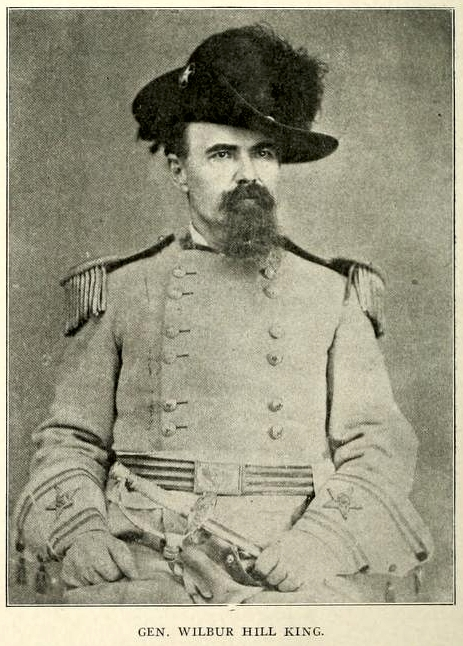
King in military uniform

Wilburn Hill King, like another Missouri officer with a similar career, Benjamin Franklin Gordon, was an early enlistee in the pro-Confederate Missouri State Guard. King was elected lieutenant of Company E of the 3rd Infantry Regiment under Major General Sterling Price. He progressed to captain and fought at the Battle of Carthage and the Battle of Wilson's Creek on August 10, 1861, where, like Gordon, he was wounded. Soon thereafter, he was discharged from the regiment and returned to Texas where he enlisted as a private in the 18th Texas Infantry Regiment. Two historians say he was appointed major and quartermaster of the Texas Division being organized by Brigadier General Henry E. McCulloch and later commanded by Major General John G. Walker on October 15, 1861.

King was elected major of the 18th Texas Infantry on May 13, 1862, lieutenant colonel on February 5, 1863 and colonel to rank from August 10, 1863. The 18th Texas Infantry was assigned to Brigade 1 in Major General John G. Walker's division. The 18th Texas Infantry was detached from Walker's division in the fall of 1863 and temporarily assigned to a cavalry division under Major General Thomas Green. On November 3, 1863, King led the regiment under Green in a successful attack on a Union Army detachment at the Battle of Bayou Bourbeux.

King's regiment was recalled to Walker's division in time for the Battle of Mansfield, Louisiana on April 8, 1864. King's regiment helped rout three Union Army divisions. King was severely wounded at the end of the attack. On April 16, 1864, General E. Kirby Smith, as commander of the Trans-Mississippi Department, assigned King to command as a brigadier general. Smith intended that King take command of the brigade formerly commanded by Major General Camille de Polignac. King could not assume this command until he had recovered from his wound in October 1864.

According to Allardice, in February 1865, King assumed command of a new Brigade 4 in Walker's old division. Eicher and Blessington show King in command of Brigade 4, a brigade of Texas regiments, in Polignac's division from September 1864 or October 8, 1864, respectively King's appointment as a brigadier general by E. Kirby Smith remained unconfirmed at the end of the war. Although King had served in general officer commands for more than a year, he was never appointed or legally promoted to general officer rank by Jefferson Davis.

== Aftermath and death ==
After E. Kirby Smith's surrender of the Confederate Trans-Mississippi Department, King, like Benjamin Franklin Gordon and Brigadier General Jo Shelby, went to Mexico. He then bought and operated a sugar plantation in Central America for a brief time. King returned briefly to the United States and married Lucy Furman in December 1867. The couple then soon left for King's Central America plantation. King returned to Texas to practice law less than a year later, after the deaths of his wife and infant.

In 1875, King became mayor of Sulphur Springs, Texas. He was a state representative from 1878 to 1881. King served as adjutant general of the State of Texas from 1881 to 1891. In 1891, he retired to Sulphur Springs where he worked on the affairs of the Masonic Order.

Wilburn Hill King died at Sulphur Springs, Texas on December 12, 1910. He was buried in Oakwood Cemetery in Corsicana, Texas after Methodist funeral rites and a Masonic burial.

== See also ==
- List of American Civil War generals (Acting Confederate)
