= Texas Military Forces =

Military component of the US state of Texas

- Founded: 18 February 1823; 203 years ago
- Country: United States
- Allegiance: State of Texas
- Size: 23,200 personnel
- Garrison/HQ: Building Eight, Camp Mabry, Austin, Texas, U.S. 30.1842173°N 97.4538338°E
- Engagements: List of conflicts involving the Texas Military

Commanders
- Commander-in-chief: Governor Greg Abbott
- Adjutant general: Major General Thomas M. Suelzer
- Joint Staff director: Vacant
- Executive Director: Shelia Taylor
- Command Sergeant Major: CSM Frederick M. Heard

The Texas Military Forces (TXMF) are the principal instrument through which the Texas Military Department (TMD) executes security policy for Texas, which has the second-largest population and border in the United States.

The Texas Military Forces have a budget of $1.851 billion as of 2023. Current forces include the Texas Army National Guard, Texas Air National Guard, and Texas State Guard of the Texas Militia. Former forces include the Texian Militia, Texian Army, Texian Navy, Texas Army, Texas Navy, and Texas Marines. It also included the Texas Rangers from their inception until 1935.

The Texas Military Forces are administered by the Texas Military Department under command of the adjutant general of Texas, who is appointed by and subordinate to the governor of Texas, the commander-in-chief-in-Texas, and is also subordinate to the president of the United States, the commander-in-chief.

== History ==
Texas Military Forces are inextricably linked and have served an integral role in the development, history, culture, and international reputation of Texas. They were established with the Texian Militia in 1823 (thirteen years before the Republic of Texas and twenty-two years before the State of Texas) by Stephen Austin to defend the Old Three Hundred in the Colony of Texas.

Texas Military Forces sparked the Texas Revolution at the Battle of Velasco and became legendary at the Battle of Gonzales (the "Lexington of Texas"). Their legend continued at their defeat by Mexican forces at Siege of the Alamo, with events such as the Immortal 32 and To the People of Texas & All Americans in the World, which resulted in one of the most notable last stands in history. As of 2018, the Alamo Mission is the most visited tourist attraction in Texas and one of ten manmade UNESCO World Heritage Sites in the United States. The Texas Military's legend was sealed at the Battle of San Jacinto, when they defeated Santa Anna's army in 18 minutes, achieving independence from the Centralist Republic of Mexico and establishing the Republic of Texas, one of three colonies to win independence without foreign aid in world history and the only American state (the Thirteen Colonies were aided by France, and the California Republic and Republic of Hawaii were aided by the United States). The artillery used during the battle, the Twin Sisters, are considered the "Holy Grail of Texas".

During the 19th century, the Texas Rangers' service in the Texas-Indians Wars and fighting outlaws significantly contributed to the folklore of the "Wild West".

During the American Civil War, Texas Military Forces served under the command of Union and Confederate militaries. When the first units reached Virginia, Jefferson Davis greeted them by declaring: "Texans! The troops of other states have their reputations to gain, but the sons of the defenders of the Alamo have theirs to maintain." The Texas Brigade achieved distinction as Confederate shock troops, while the Davis Guards maintained Texas as the only Confederate State, along with Florida, unconquered by the Union with their victory at Second Battle of Sabine Pass. It is referred to as the "Thermopylae of the Confederacy" and the most one-sided Confederate victory of the war. Texas Military Forces also fought at the Battle of Palemito Ranch.

Texas Military Forces have not waged a domestic combat operation since the 19th century. Throughout the 20th and 21st centuries, they have been primarily engaged in military operations other than war, including manmade and natural disaster operations, search and rescue operations, counterdrug operations, and border security operations. Most notably, the Mexican drug war, Texas City Disaster, Hurricane Harvey, Hurricane Katrina, Hurricane Rita, Bastrop County Complex Fire, Operation Jump Start, Operation Phalanx, Operation Faithful Patriot, COVID-19 pandemic, George Floyd protests, and Operation Lone Star.

Under command of the United States Department of Defense, Texas Military Forces have served in the Mexican War, Spanish War, Philippine War, Mexican Expedition, World War I, World War II, Cold War (Korea and Vietnam campaigns), and War on Terror. Since the September 11 attacks, Texas Military units have been deployed for the war on terror more than any other state.

== Administration ==
Texas Military Forces are administered by the Texas Military Department under command of the Adjutant General of Texas, who is appointed by and subordinate to the governor of Texas, the commander in chief.

== Authority ==
Texas Military Forces exist under civilian control. Since 1903, Texas Military Forces are authorized by Title 32 of the United States Code and Article 4 of the Texas Constitution to "execute the laws of the State, to suppress insurrections, and to repel invasions." Texas Army National Guard and Texas Air National Guard units are also subject to Title 10 of the United States Code, which legally empowers the Government of the United States to mobilize them when more resources are needed than available in the United States Armed Forces for war, national emergency, or national security. Under Title 10, operations are conducted under command of the United States Department of Defense by the Secretary of Defense.

== Awards and decorations ==
Awards and decorations of the Texas Military are the medals, ribbons, badges, tabs, trophies, plaques, certificates, memorials, monuments, holidays, and general honors that recognize service and achievement in the Texas Military Forces.

== Conflicts ==
The history of conflicts involving the Texas Military Forces spans over two centuries, from 1823 to the present, under the command authority (the ultimate source of lawful military orders) of four governments including the Texan government (in 3 incarnations), the U.S. government, the Mexican government, and the Confederate government.

== Capability ==
The Texas Military Forces are the most capable forces among the state National Guards (Army and Air). They include infantry, paratroopers, special forces, armored cavalry, field artillery, communication, cyber, intelligence, support, medical, engineering, civil affairs, and weapon of mass destruction response units totaling over 23,000 service members. It also maintains a fleet of manned and unmanned aircraft with strike, reconnaissance, and transport capabilities, a fleet of rotorcraft, and a fleet of riverine watercraft. It maintains a statewide network of garrison, training, and monitoring installations. It maintains command and control through shelter and mobile tactical operations centers.

== Units ==
Texas Military Forces have undergone many re-designations, reorganizations, and reformations since 1823. Since 1846, Texas Militia units constitute the entirety of the Texas Military Forces.

=== Current forces ===
==== Texas Army National Guard ====
The Texas Army National Guard is the current land warfare branch of the Texas Military Forces for the State of Texas. Its major units include the 36th Infantry Division, the 56th Infantry Brigade Combat Team, the 72nd Infantry Brigade Combat Team, the 36th Combat Aviation Brigade, the 71st Battlefield Surveillance Brigade, the 36th Sustainment Brigade, the 176th Engineer Brigade, the 136th Maneuver Enhancement Brigade, the 136th Expeditionary Signal Battalion, and the 136th Regiment (CA) (RTI).

==== Texas Air National Guard ====
The Texas Air National Guard is the current air warfare branch of the Texas Military Forces for the State of Texas. It is composed of the 149th Fighter Wing, the 136th Airlift Wing, the 147th Attack Wing, the 254th Combat Communications Group, the 272nd Engineering Installation Squadron, and the 204th Security Forces Squadron. The 149th Fighter Wing prepares pilots for combat, the 136th Airlift Wing flies C-130s in-and out of theater and the 147th Reconnaissance Wing has recently acquired Reapers to be the eyes in the hostile sky.

==== Texas State Guard ====
The Texas State Guard is the current state defense force branch of the Texas Military Forces for the State of Texas. It assists and augments Texas military and civil authorities in times of state emergencies, and in on-going support of National Guard units and local communities.

=== Former forces ===
==== Texian Militia ====
The Texian Militia was the militia forces of the Texian Colony from 1823 to 1835 and the inaugurate force of the Texas Military. It was established by Stephen F. Austin on August 5, 1823, for defense of the Old Three Hundred colonists against the Karankawa, Comanche, and Cherokee tribes; among others. Its most notable unit, the Texas Rangers, remained in continuous service of Texas Military Forces until 1935.

==== Texas Rangers ====
The Texas Rangers were established as a unit of the Texian Militia in the Texian Colony. During the Texas Revolution, it served as a unit of the Texian Army providing cavalry and conducting special operations such as demolition of Vince's Bridge and Immortal 32 relief force. During the Republic of Texas, it continued to serve as a special forces unit employing guerrilla warfare in the Texas-Indian Wars.

==== Texian Army ====
The Texian Army, also known as the Revolutionary Army and Army of the People, was the land warfare branch of the Texian armed forces during the Texas Revolution. It spontaneously formed from the Texian Militia in October 1835 following the Battle of Gonzales. Along with the Texian Navy, it helped the Republic of Texas win independence from the Centralist Republic of Mexico on May 14, 1836, at the Treaties of Velasco. Although the Texas Army was officially established by the Consultation of the Republic of Texas on November 13, 1835, it did not replace the Texian Army until after the Battle of San Jacinto.

==== Texian Navy ====
The Texian Navy, also known as the Revolutionary Navy and First Texas Navy, was the naval warfare branch of the Texian armed forces during the Texas Revolution. It was established by the Consultation of the Republic of Texas on November 25, 1835. Along with the Texian Army, it helped the Republic of Texas win independence from the Centralist Republic of Mexico on May 14, 1836, at the Treaties of Velasco. It was replaced by the Texas Navy on March 23, 1839.

==== Texas Army ====
The Texas Army, officially the Army of the Republic of Texas, was the land warfare branch of the Texas Military Forces during the Republic of Texas. It descended from the Texian Army, which was established in October 1835 to fight for independence from Centralist Republic of Mexico in the Texas Revolution. The Texas Army was provisionally formed by the Consultation in November 1835, however it did not replace the Texian Army until after the Battle of San Jacinto. The Texas Army, Texas Navy, and Texas Militia were officially established on September 5, 1836, in Article II of the Constitution of the Republic of Texas. The Texas Army and Texas Navy were merged with the United States Armed Forces on February 19, 1846, after the Republic of Texas became the 28th state of America.

==== Texas Navy ====
The Texas Navy, officially the Navy of the Republic of Texas, also known as the Second Texas Navy, was the naval warfare branch of the Texas Military Forces during the Republic of Texas. It descended from the Texian Navy, which was established in November 1835 to fight for independence from Centralist Republic of Mexico in the Texas Revolution. The Texas Navy, Texas Army, and Texas Militia were officially established on September 5, 1836, in Article II of the Constitution of the Republic of Texas. The Texas Navy and Texas Army were merged with the United States Armed Forces on February 19, 1846, after the Republic of Texas became the 28th state of America.

==== Texas Marines ====
The Texas Marines, officially the Marine Corps of the Republic of Texas, were the naval infantry of the Texas Navy tasked with enforcing discipline aboard ships, providing security at shore stations, sharpshooting, and naval boarding. It was officially established on January 14, 1836, and modeled after the United States Marines Corps.

==== Texas Militia ====
Since 1846, Texas Militia units have constituted the entirety of the Texas Military Forces. Current units are the Texas Army National Guard, Texas Air National Guard, and Texas State Guard. Former units include the Texas Home Guard/State Troops (1861–65), Texas Volunteer Guard (1871-1904), Texas Reserve Militia (1905-1913), Texas Home Guard (1914-1918), Texas Reserve Militia (1919-1940), Texas Defense/State Guard (1941–45), and Texas State Guard Reserve Corps (1945-1965).

== Notable members ==
George W. Bush

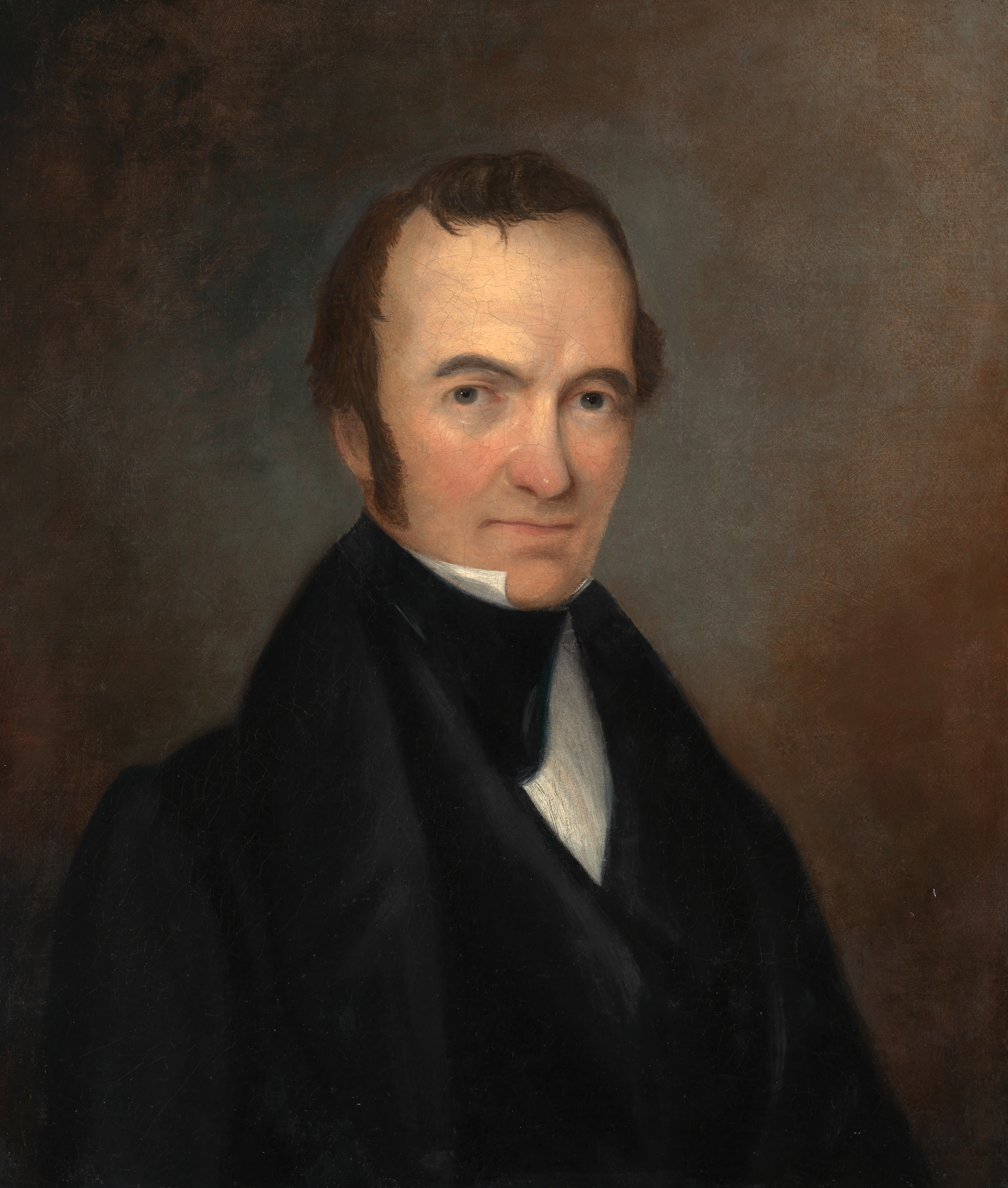
Stephen F. Austin

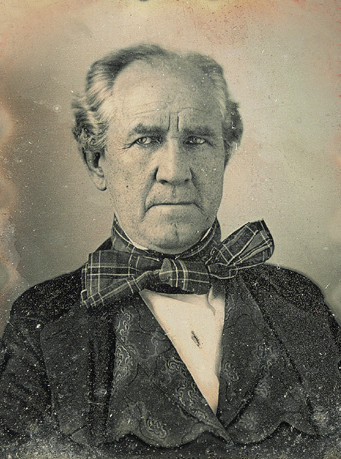
Sam Houston

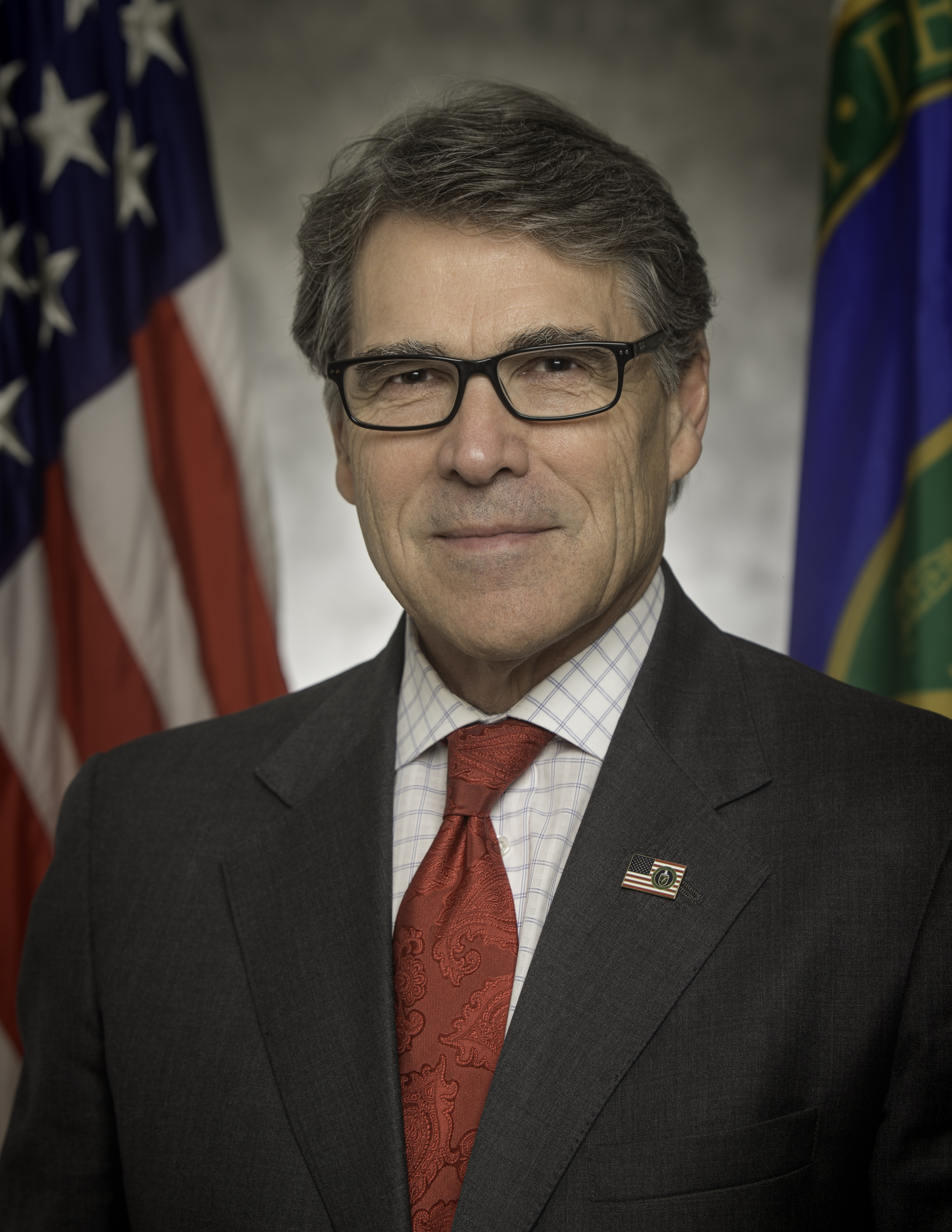
Rick Perry

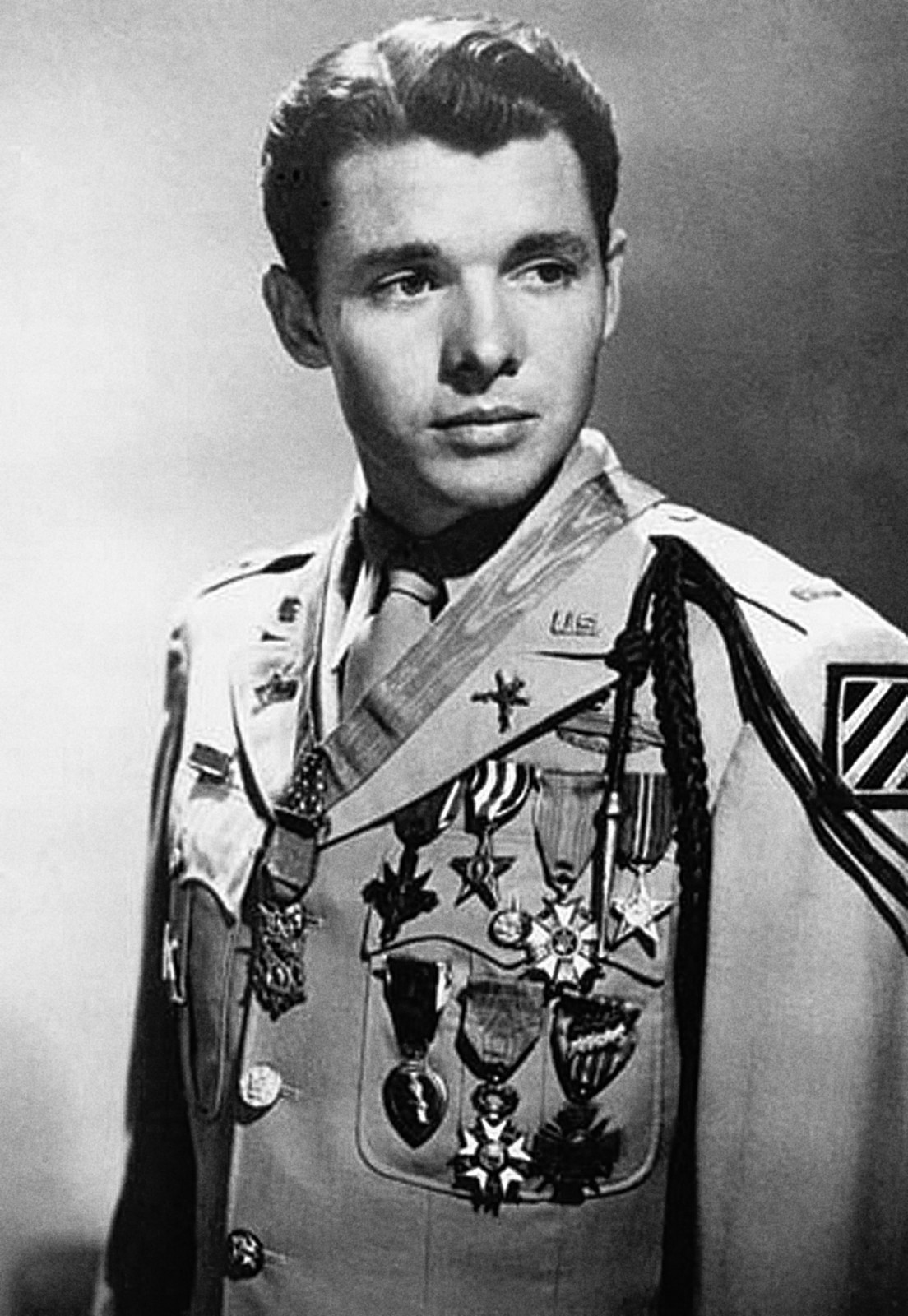
Audie Murphy

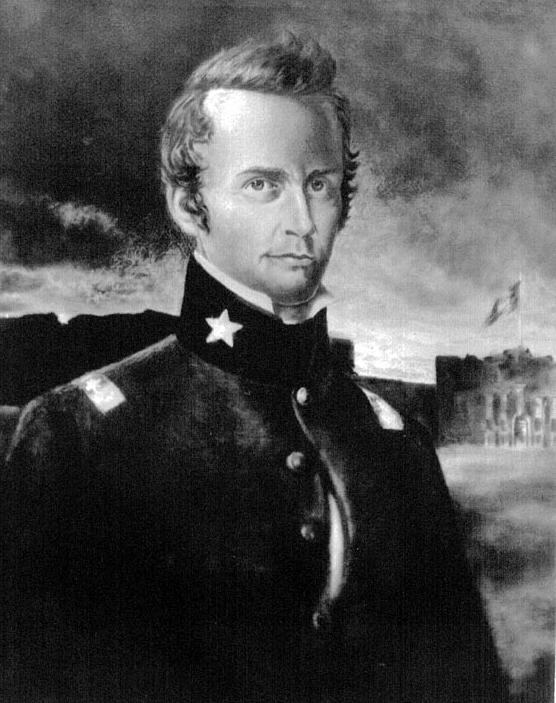
William Travis

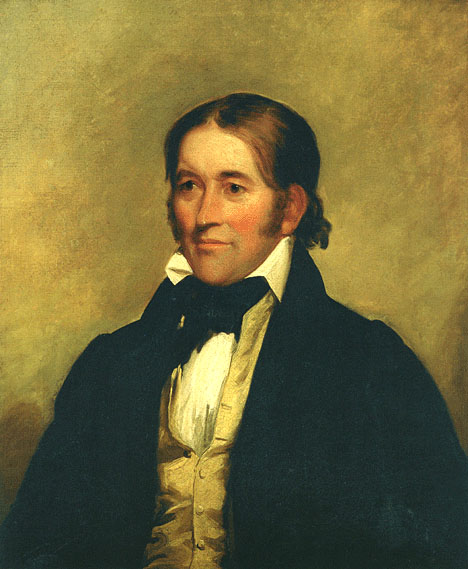
Davy Crockett

Jack L. Knight

James M. Logan

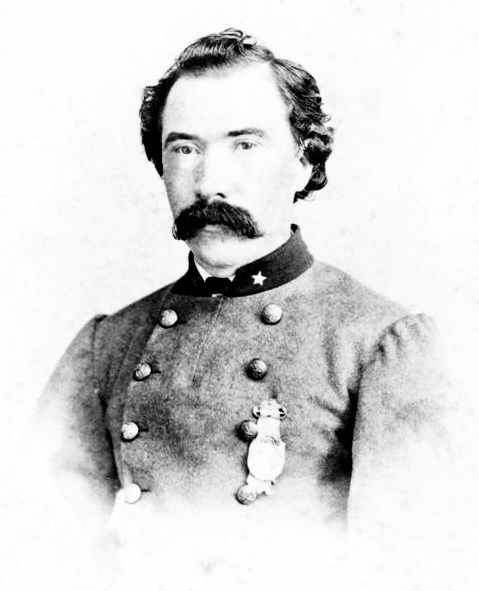
Richard W. Dowling

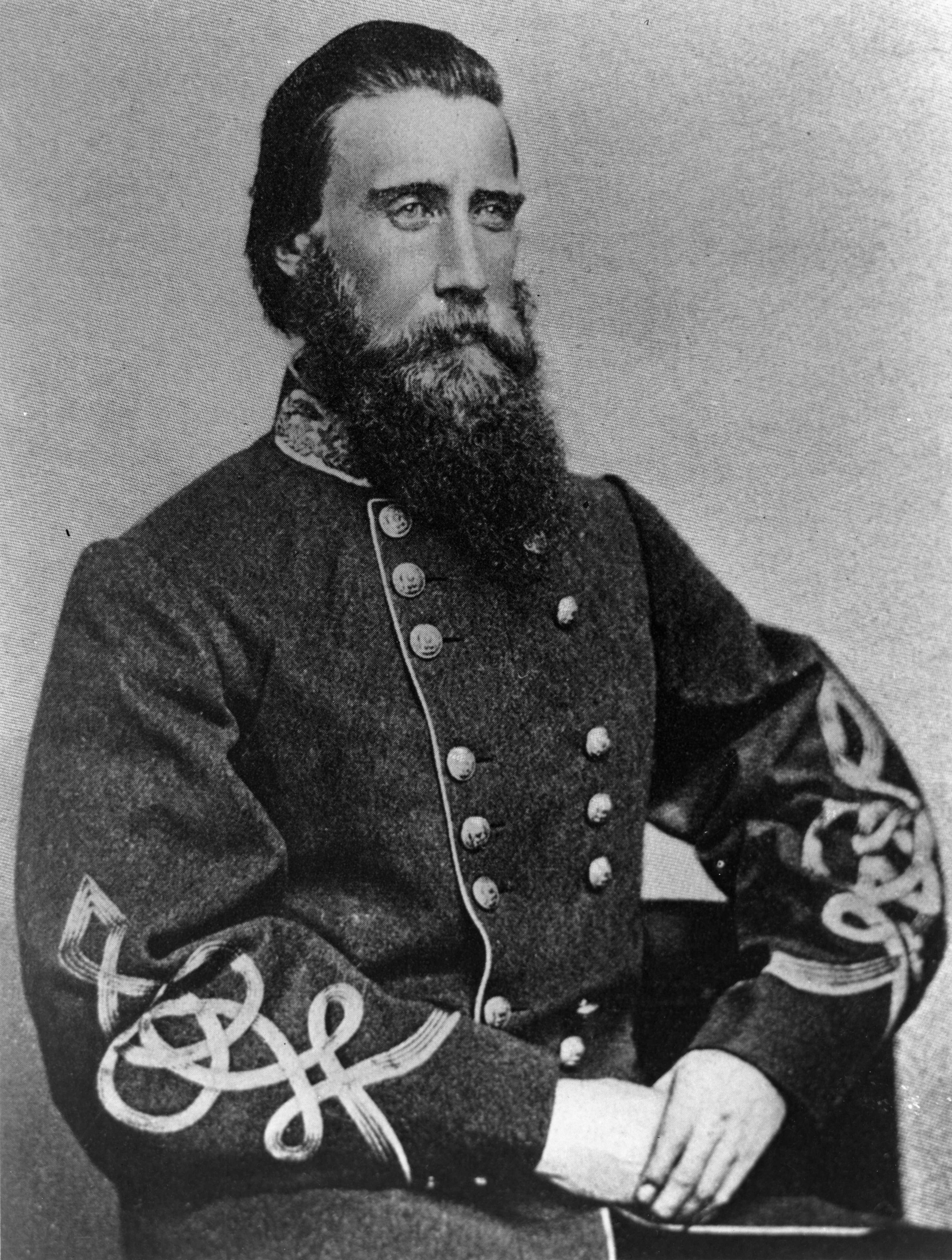
John Bell Hood

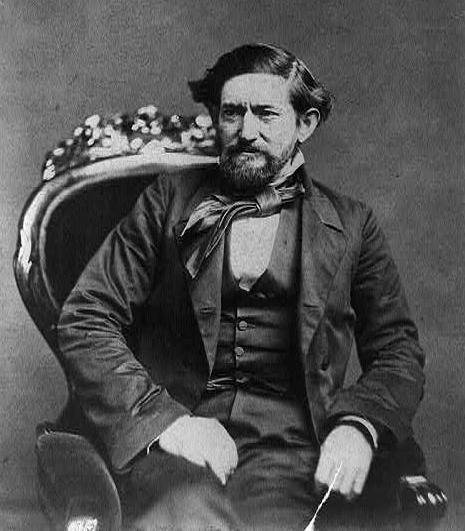
John Coffee Hays

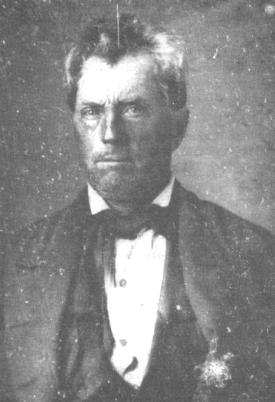
Edward Burleson

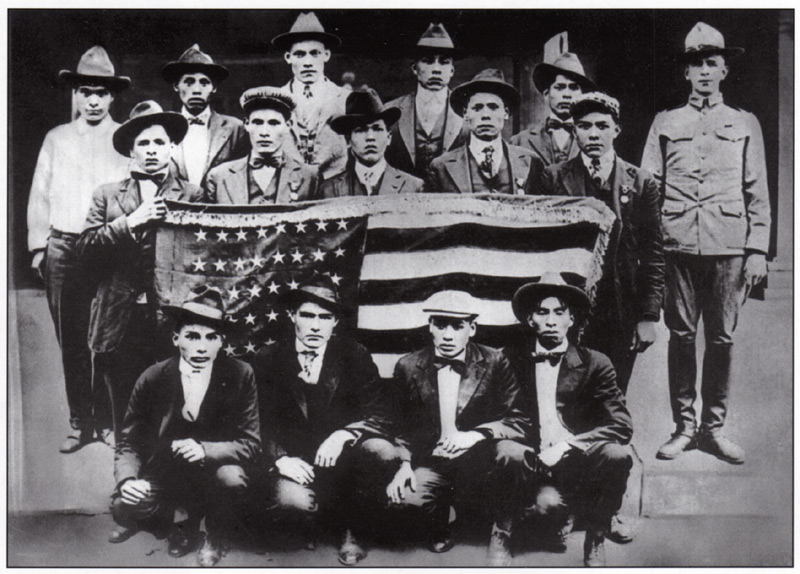
Choctaw code talkers

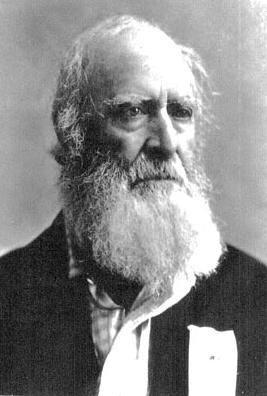
Frank W. Johnson

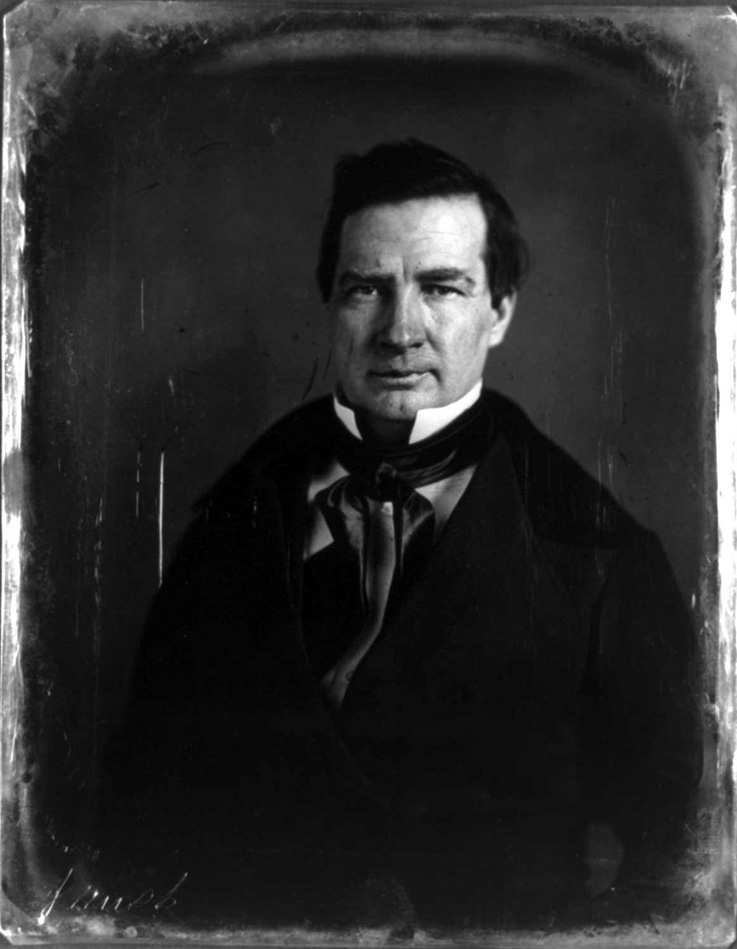
Thomas Jefferson Rusk

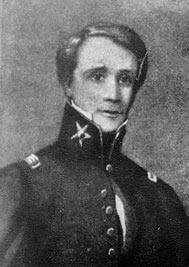
Sidney Sherman

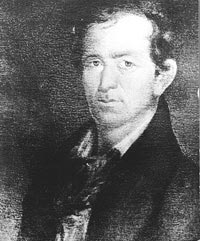
Erastus "Deaf" Smith

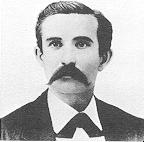
John B. Jones

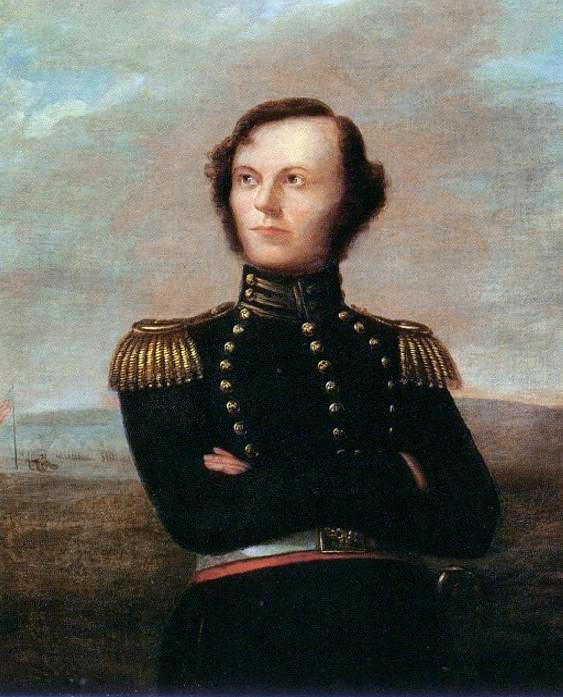
James Fannin

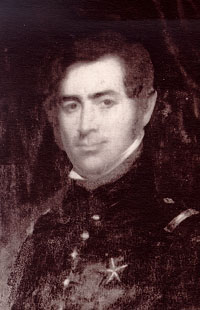
Benjamin Milam

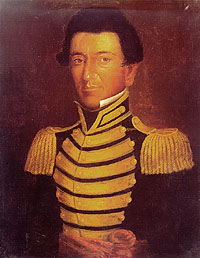
Juan Seguin

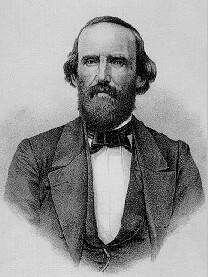
Benjamin McCulloch

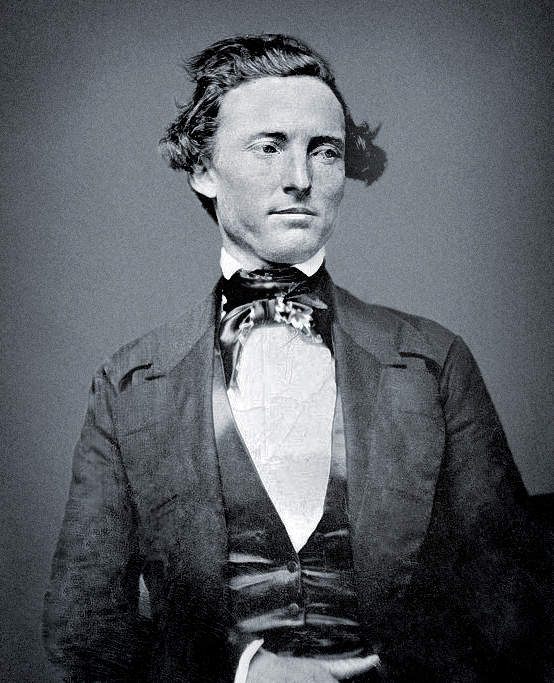
Samuel Hamilton Walker

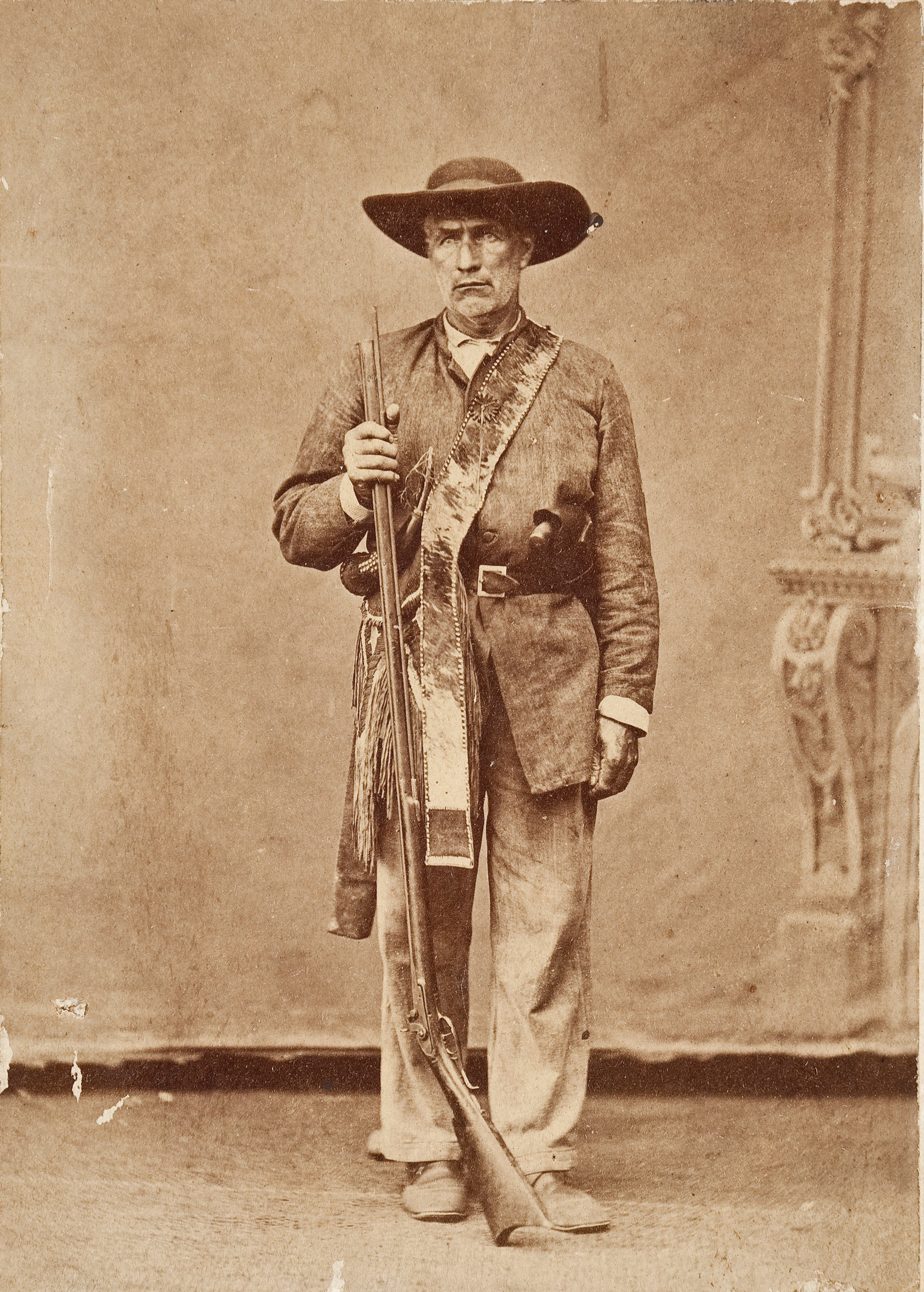
William A. A. Wallace

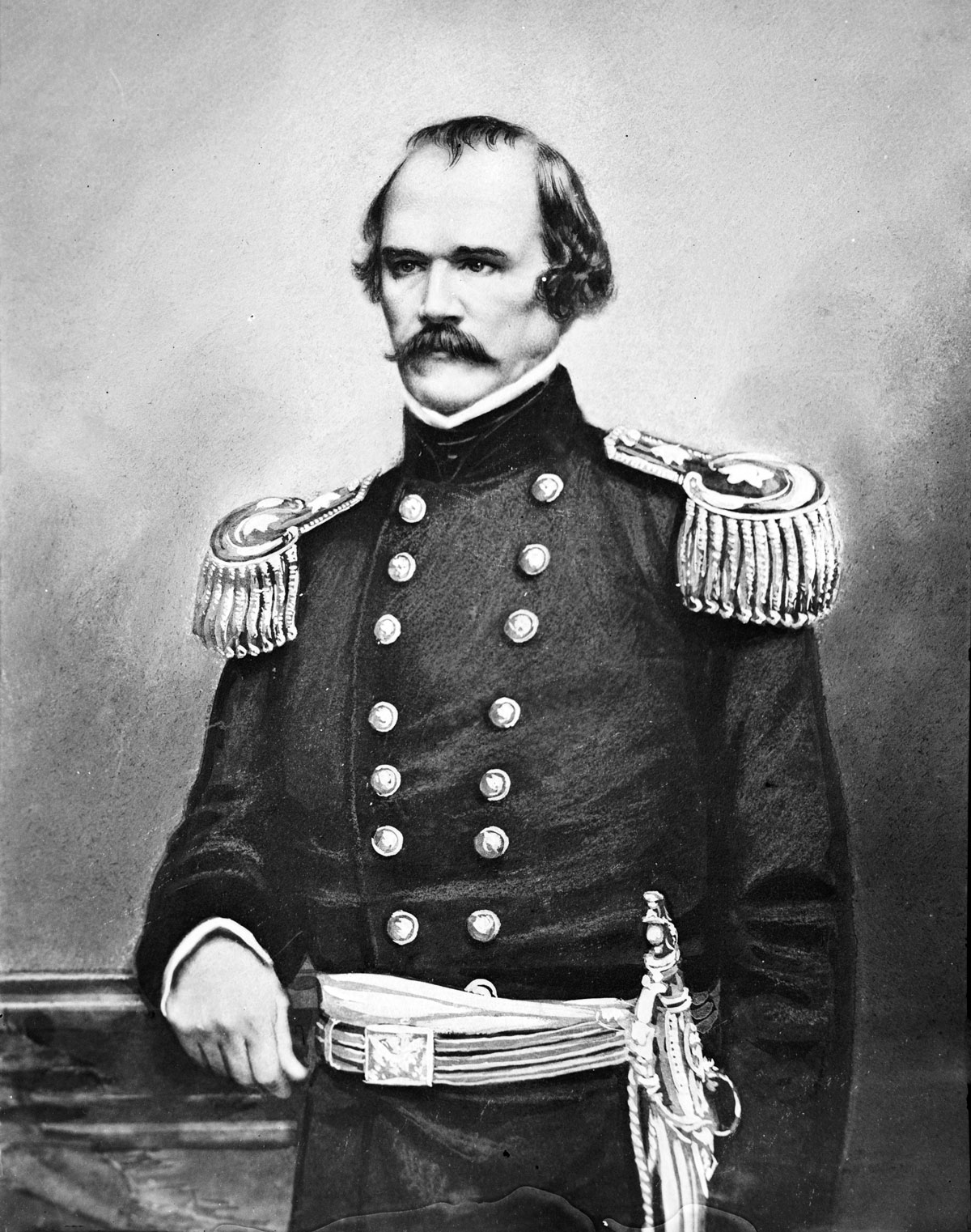
Albert Sidney Johnston

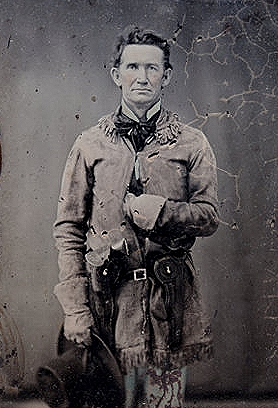
John Salmon Ford

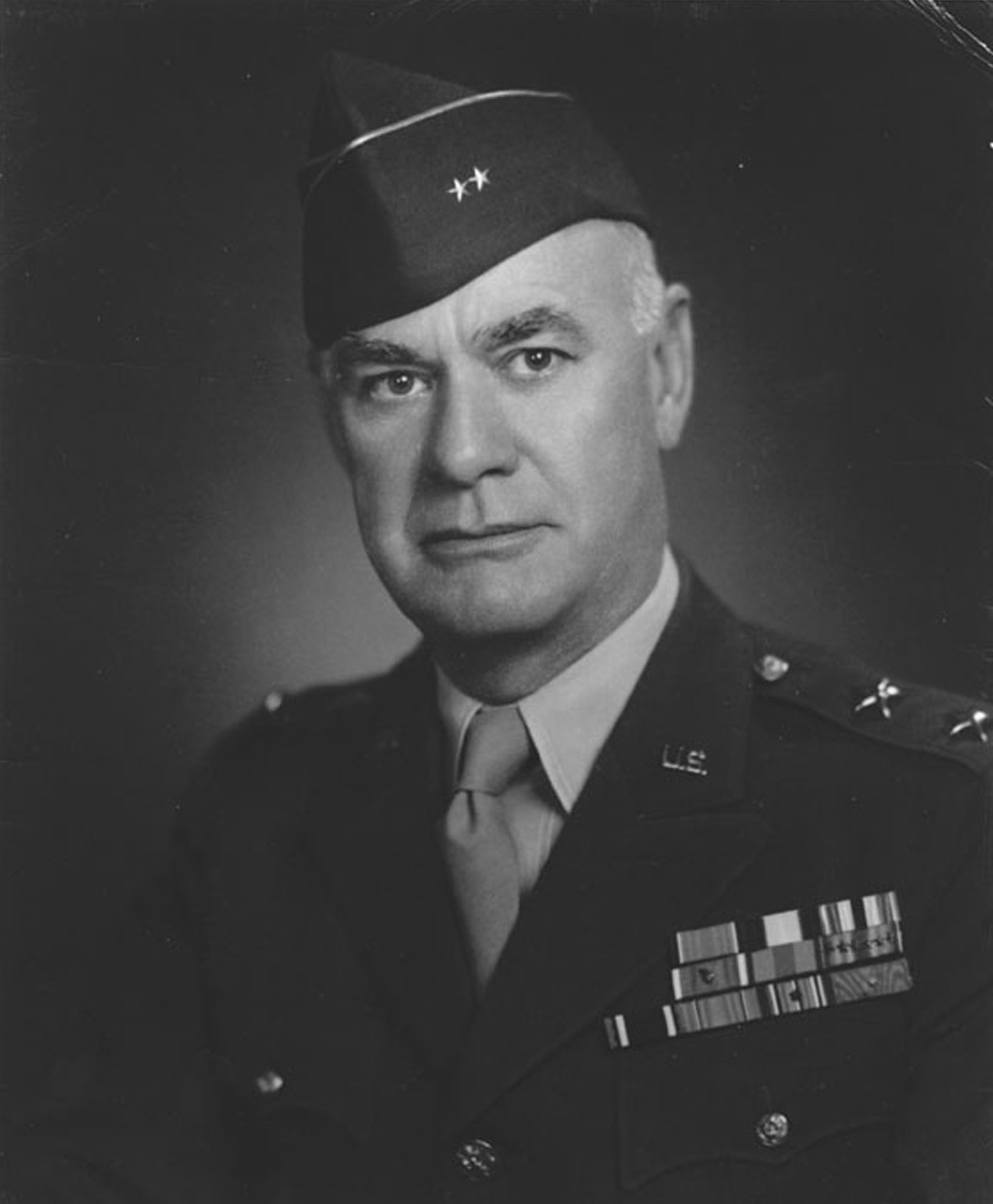
Fred L. Walker

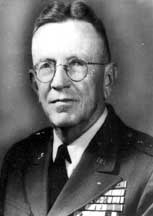
Clayton P. Kerr

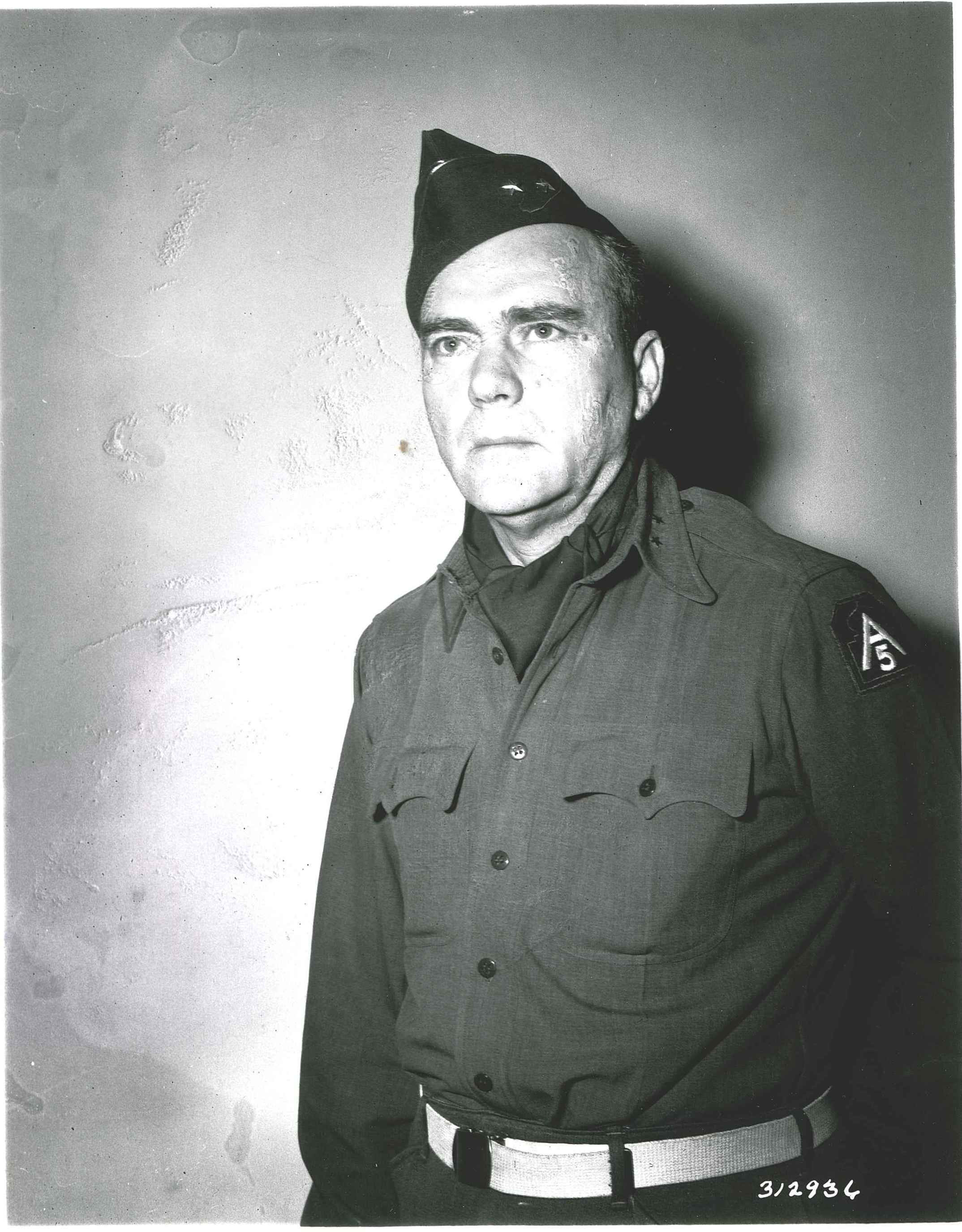
Harry H. Johnson

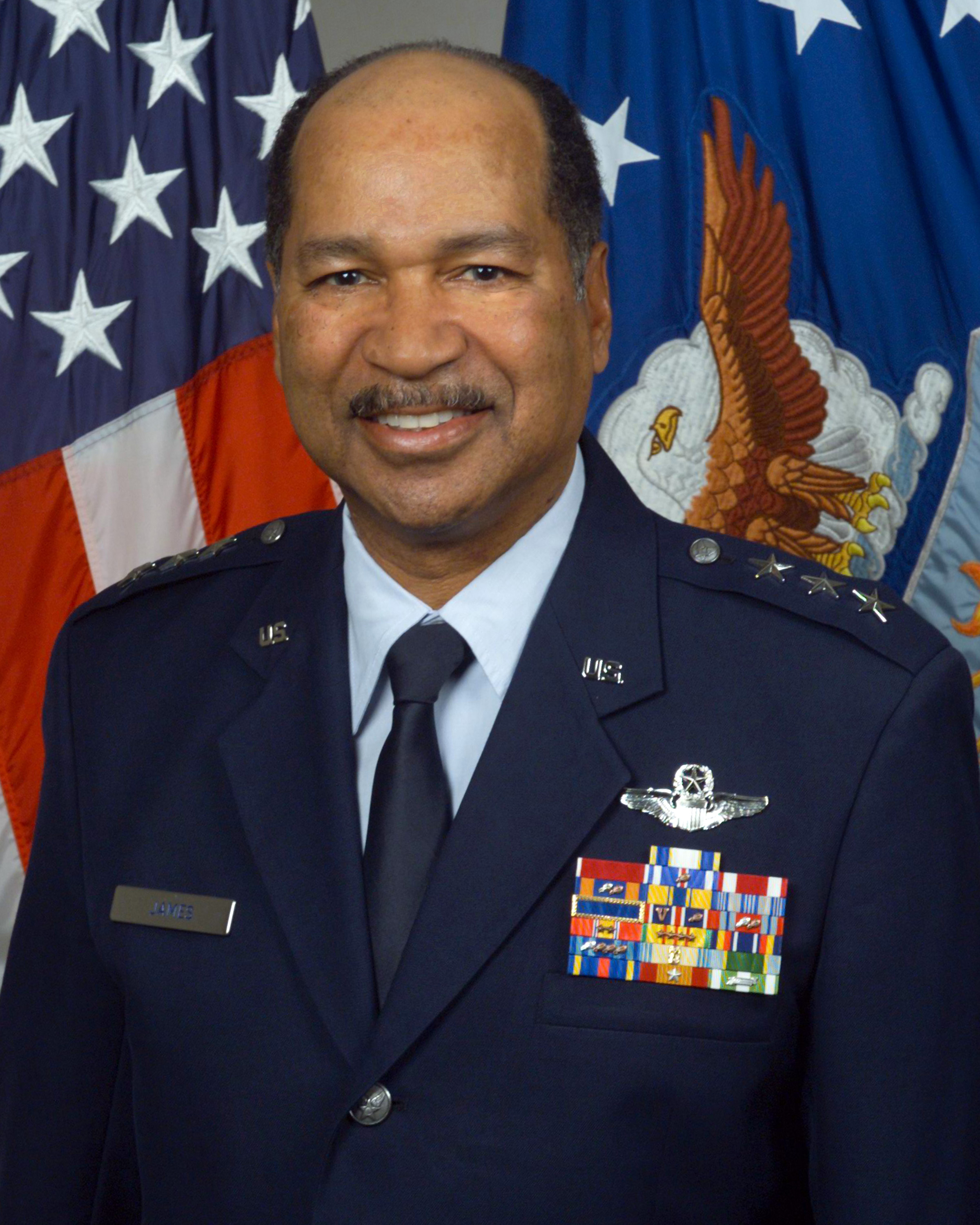
Daniel James III

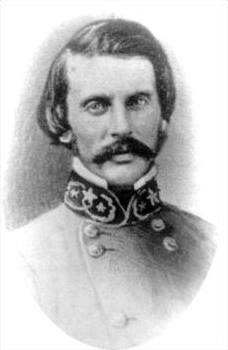
William Steele

== Portrayal in media ==
- 1945: The Battle of San Pietro, a documentary film based on the Battle of San Pietro. Depicts the 36th Infantry Division.
- 1945: A Walk in the Sun, a feature film based on the Battle of Salerno. Depicts the 36th Infantry Division.
- 1960: The Alamo, a feature film based on the Battle of the Alamo. Depicts Texas Rangers and Texian Army.
- 1993: Gettysburg, a feature film based on the Battle of Gettysburg. Depicts the Texas Brigade.
- 1997: Rough Riders, a feature film based on the Battle of San Juan Hill. Depicts the Texas Rangers serving in the 1st United States Volunteer Cavalry.
- 1989: Lonesome Dove, a miniseries based on a fictional plot. Depicts the Texas Rangers.
- 1998: Dead Man's Walk, a miniseries based on the Texan Santa Fe Expedition. Depicts the Texas Rangers and Texas Army.
- 2004: The Alamo, a feature film based on the Battle of the Alamo. Depicts Texas Rangers and Texian Army.
- 2010: Choctaw Code Talkers: a documentary film based on the Choctaw Code Talkers of the 142nd Infantry Regiment during the Battles of the Meuse–Argonne.
- 2015: Texas Rising, a 10-hour miniseries based on the Texas Revolution. Depicts Texas Rangers and Texian Army.
- 2018: The Men Who Built America: Frontiersmen ("Empire or Liberty"), an episode based on the Battle of the Alamo. Depicts Texas Rangers and Texian Army.

== See also ==
- Texas Military Department
- Texas Special Operations Units
- List of conflicts involving the Texas Military
- Awards and decorations of the Texas Military
