= Twin Sisters (cannons) =

Cannons used in the Texas Revolution

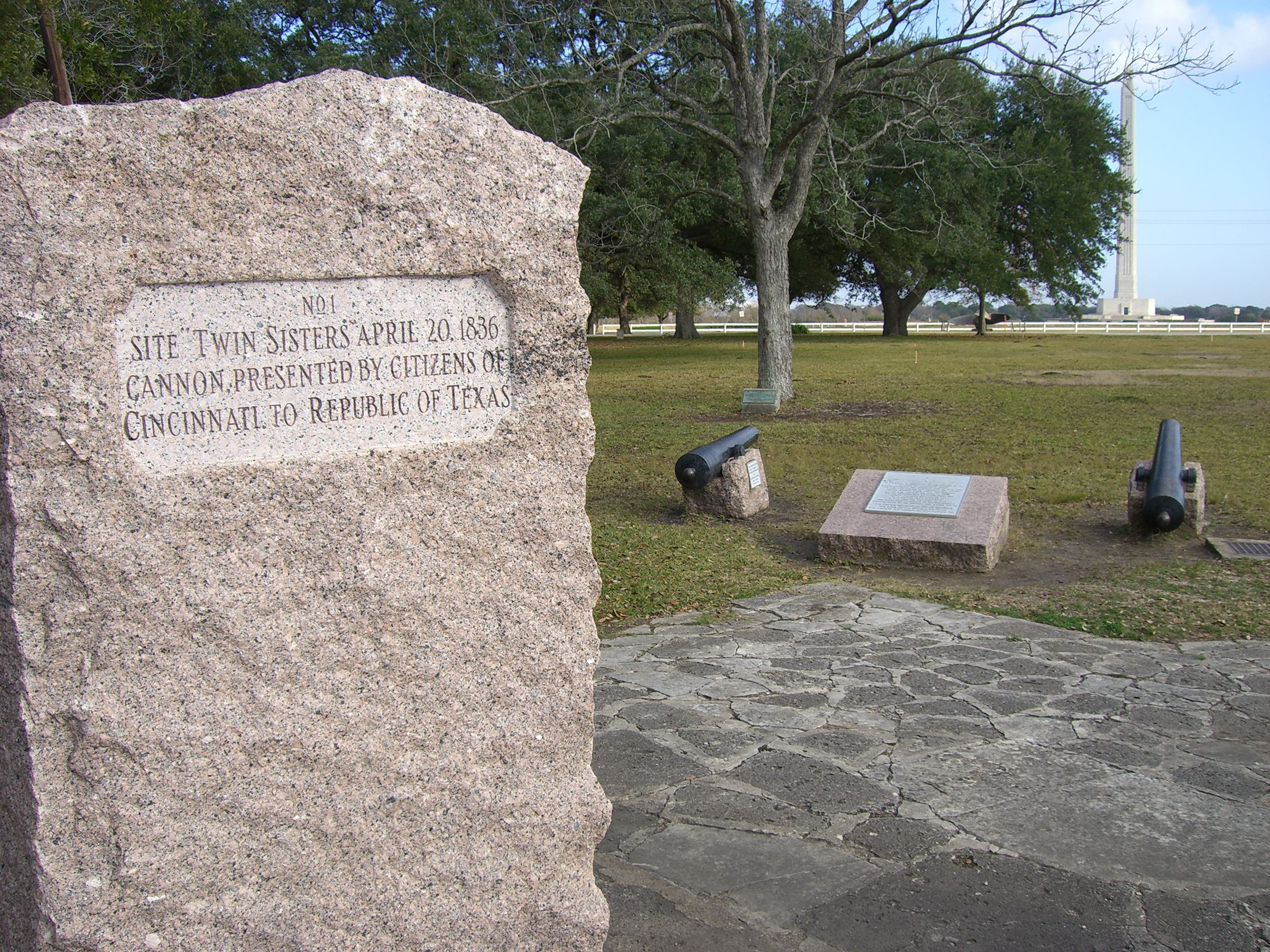
Twin Sisters Monument featured at the San Jacinto Monument (seen in rear) in Deer Park, Texas. Cannons shown are replicas, as the original Twin Sisters remain missing.

The Twin Sisters are a pair of cannons used by Texas Military Forces during the Texas Revolution. They are among the most famous artillery in Texas military history with the "Come and Take It" cannon starting the revolution at the Battle of Gonzales and the Twin Sisters winning it at the Battle of San Jacinto. The Twin Sisters were also potentially used during the Mexican Invasions of 1842 and American Civil War.

Their disappearance and ensuing search efforts have fueled their notoriety, colloquially referred to as the "Texas Holy Grail."

== History ==
=== Provenance ===
Nearly every aspect of the Twin Sisters is debated among historians, archaeologists, and treasure hunters including their design, type (iron or bronze), caliber (four or six pounder), foundry of fabrication (Hawkins and Tatum or Eagle Iron Works/Greenwood), origin of the "Twin Sisters" moniker, where they were used, and where they disappeared.

The earliest and most credible primary source of their name, origin, and role comes from a letter by President of the Republic of Texas, David G. Burnet 92 days after the Battle of San Jacinto. It was written on July 22, 1836 and published in the Telegraph and Texas Register (Columbia, TX Vol. 1, No. 27, Ed. 1) on Tuesday, August 30, 1836:

Executive Department, Republic of Texas, Velasco, July 23, 1836.

To Daniel M. Drake, M. D.; William Corry, Esq.; Pulaski Smith, Esq.; Nathan Leamans, Esq., and W. Chase, Esq.

Gentlemen: Two beautiful pieces of "hollow-ware," lately presented to us, through your agency, by the citizens of Cincinnati, as a free-will offering to the cause of human liberty, were received very opportunely, and have become conspicuous in our struggle for independence. Their first effective operations were in the memorable field of San Jacinto, where they contributed greatly to the achievement of a victory not often paralleled in the annals, of war. I doubt not their voices will again be heard, and their power be felt in the great and interesting cause to which they were dedicated by your liberality, and in the advancement of which we are so arduously engaged.

To you, gentlemen, and to the citizens of Cincinnati, who have manifested so generous a sympathy in our cause, I beg leave to tender the warmest thanks of a people who are contending for their liberties and their lives, against a numerous nation of semi-savages, whose cruelty is equalled only by their want of spirit and military prowess.

Should our enemy have the temerity to renew his attempt to subjugate our delightful country, the voices of the TWIN SISTERS of Cincinnati, will yet send their reverberations beyond the Rio Grande, and carry unusual terror into many a Mexican hamlet. Texas has no desire to extend her conquests beyond her own natural and appropriate limits, but if the war must be prosecuted against us, after abundant evidence of its futility has been exhibited to the enemy and the world, other land than our own must sustain a portion of its ravages.

Permit me, gentlemen, to tender to you, and to your fellow-citizens who have rendered Texas much efficient aid, assurances if my profound esteem.

Your ob,'t serv.'t,

(Signed) DAVID G. BURNET

==== Name ====
The origin of the "Twin Sisters" moniker is debated.

The first documented use of the name comes from a letter by President of the Republic of Texas, David G. Burnet 92 days after the Battle of San Jacinto. It was written on July 22, 1836 and published in the Telegraph and Texas Register (Columbia, TX Vol. 1, No. 27, Ed. 1) on Tuesday, August 30, 1836:

...Should our enemy have the temerity to renew his attempt to subjugate our delightful country, the voices of the TWIN SISTERS of Cincinnati, will yet send their reverberations beyond the Rio Grande, and carry unusual terror into many a Mexican hamlet...

An exposition of the most repeated provenance comes from Elizabeth Mars (née Rice) Stapp in a letter to the editor of The Houston Daily Post on August 24, 1897 — 61 years after the Battle of San Jacinto. It was published in the post (Vol. THIRTEENTH YEAR, No. 147, Ed. 1) on Sunday, August 29, 1897:

THIS TWIN SISTERS

One of Their Sponsors Tells of the Famous Cannon.

To the Editor of The Post, Carranchua Bay, Jackson County, Texas, August 24 — Some time ago you said in your paper that you would like to know where the Twin Sisters were and how they received their names. I being an old veterans daughter and wife, can tell you. They were named for myself and twin sister, Elizabeth and Eleanor Rice, daughter of Dr. Charles W. Rice, who joined the army as surgeon in 1836 and came to Texas in defense of her liberty. And I am the wife of H.S. Stapp, an old Texan, who came to Texas in the year 1833 and served his country in every crisis. He stood guard at 16, belonged to the Rangers in 1845 and was a true patriot for his country, an honest man.

Well, I must crave your mercy and go back again to 1836 and tell why the Twin Sisters were name after my twin sister and myself. In the beginning of the year 1836 the Medical College of Ohio met at Cincinnati to take a course of lectures under Professors Crop, Eberley, Buster, Black and other great lights in medical science. They were settling a point; the Northern physician asserted that a Southern physician could not practice in the North and the Southern physician assorted that the Northerners could not practice South, as the climate was so different that what would cure in one section would kill in the other. And they settled it by meeting in Cincinnati and taking a course of lectures. My father, Dr. Charles W. Rice, went North in the beginning of the year to take a course also. Among my father's friends was a gentleman by the name of Lewis Allan, who lived with my father, a refined, true Christian gentleman, and my father loved him, as their characters assimilated. In the latter part of 1836, Mr. Lewis Allan was made a captain, and the ladies of Cincinnati bought the cannon and presented it to the company, and Colonel Lewis Allan, my father's old friend named the cannon after myself and twin sister.

Captain Allan went to Mexico with his company in, I think, the latter part of 1836, was a brave man and was made Colonel, and when he returned to New Orleans the ladies presented him with a sword and gave him a public dinner. God help him, I say, wherever he is is the prayer of this old veteran Texas lady.

The old, old cannon did its duty well and lies disabled and worn out at Galveston. They did their duty well, but useless now as the writer of these old-time reminiscences.

Now, my friend, The Post, put these old time [intelligible] happened, not quite 8, but old enough to remember.

Very respectfully,

Elizabeth M. Stapp.

==== Cincinnati connection ====
Why Cincinnatians aided Texas is debated. Among the theories include:

- Robert Todd Lytle led a fund raising initiative for the cannons because he believed "that as American citizens, we can do no less than encourage the Spirit of Freedom, wherever or by whatever people it might be displayed".
- David T. Disney, whose brother Richard Disney was executed in the Goliad Massacre, purportedly worked with Robert Todd Lylte on fund raising.
- Andrew M. Clopper, who served in the Texian Army, is the son of Nicholas Clopper, a land speculator in Cincinnati who owned Morgan's Point, purportedly worked with Robert Todd Lylte on fund raising.
- Thomas F. Corry, an emigrant from Cincinnati who served in the Texian Army, may have been related to the "William Corry" of whom President Burnet addressed in his letter of thanks on July 22, 1836.
- Society of the Cincinnati, a fraternity of American Revolutionary War officers dedicated to promoting freedom. Approximately 59 veterans of the American Revolutionary War are buried in Texas and at least 4 are known to have also fought in the Texas Revolution: Benjamin W. Anderson, Alexander Hodge, Antonio Gil Y'Barbo. The fourth, Stephen Williams, also fought in the War of 1812.

On April 7, 1895, Andrew Jackson Houston gifted Santa Anna's dagger, a war trophy from the Battle of San Jacinto, to Cincinnatians.

=== Texas Revolution ===
The Twin Sisters played a vital role as the only Texian artillery in the Battle of San Jacinto, which effectively ended the Texas Revolution and established the Republic of Texas.

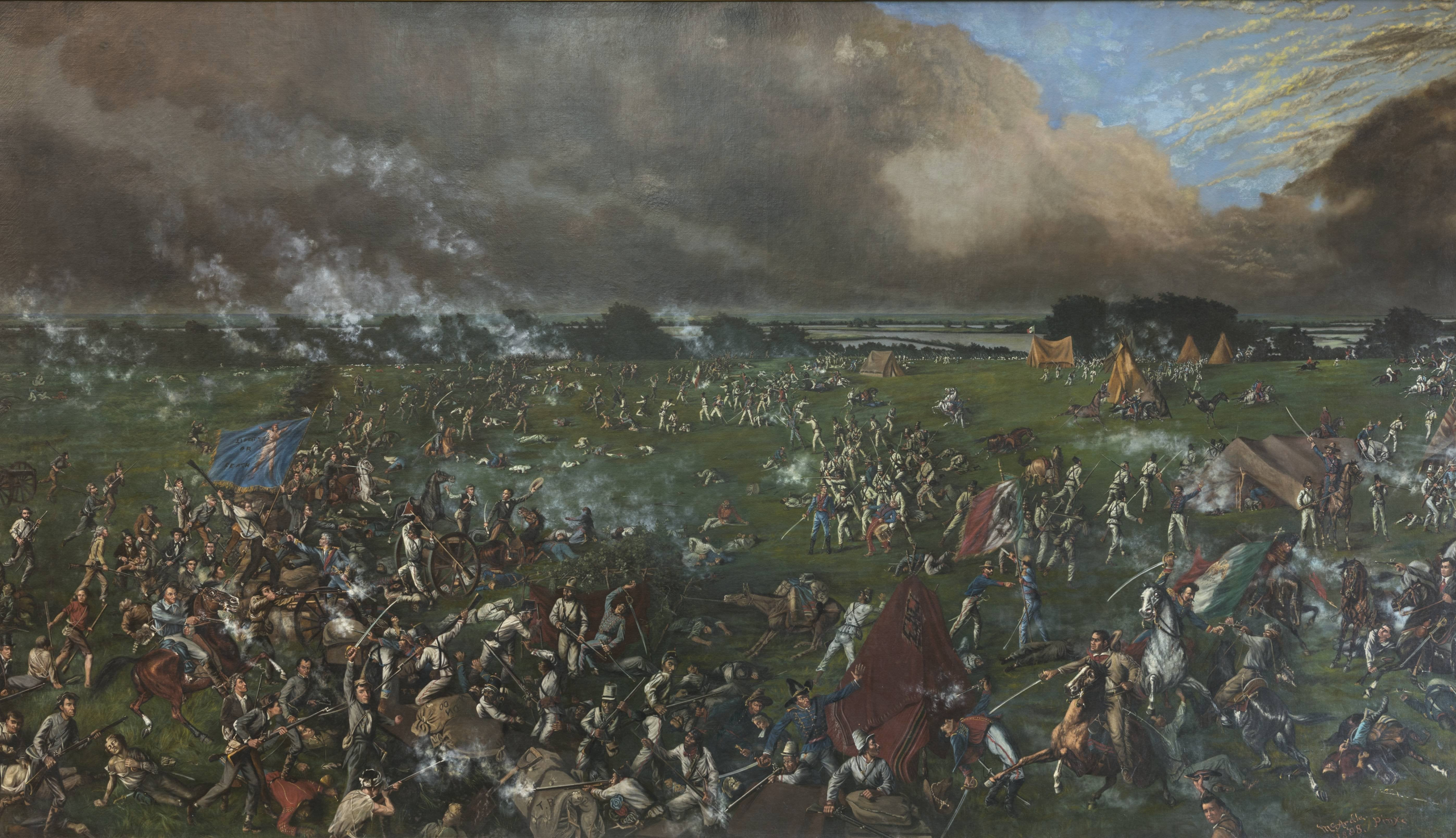
Battle of San Jacinto, 21 April 1836

They arrived at Brazoria on March 28, 1836 and were received by Captain John M. Allen as the Texian Army, under command of General Sam Houston, was maneuvering against the Mexican Army, under command of General Santa Anna, near San Felipe de Austin, approximately 90 miles away. Fearful of interception, quartermaster general Colonel Almanzon Huston ordered the Twin Sisters to Galveston Island via the schooner Pennsylvania. They arrived on April 3 and were received by Colonel Edward Harcourt. Secretary of War David Thomas then ordered the steamboat Ohio under command of Captain Aaron Burns to retrieve them via the Buffalo Bayou for relocation to Harrisburg. The Ohio arrived at New Washington on April 6 where the schooner Flash, under the command of Captain Luke Falval and supervision of Secretary of the Navy Robert Potter, were waiting with the Twin Sisters.

The Twin Sisters arrived in Harrisburg on April 8 and were loaded onto bullock carts by Major Leander Smith, Captain John M. Allen, and Captain Alfred Henderson Wyly for transport to the Bernardo Plantation (near Hempstead) where the Texian Army was now encamped. The 44,000 acre plantation was the first and largest cotton plantation in Texas. It was established by Old Three Hundred settler Jared E. Groce who freely provided refuge to the Texian cause. Stalled by the "sea of mud" from April showers, the detachment completed the 60 mile trip on April 13. They are received by Lieutenant Colonel James C. Neill, who assigns a company of nine soldiers to each cannon:

Artillery	Commanding Officer	Senior Enlisted Advisor	Crew	Crew	Crew	Crew	Crew	Crew	Crew
Twin Battery	CPT George W. Poe	1SG Thomas P. Plaster	PVT Soloman B. Bardwell	PVT George W. Seaton	PVT Willis Collins	PVT Thomas N.B. Greer	PVT Hugh M. Swift	PVT Joseph Floyd	PVT Daniel T. Dunham
Twin Battery	CPT Isaac N Moreland	1SG Richardson A. Scurry	PVT Alfred Benton	PVT Montgomery Baxter	PVT John M. Wade	PVT Ellis Benson	PVT Benjamin McCulloch	PVT John P. Ferrell	PVT Thomas Green

On April 20, the Twin Sisters are engaged in combat for the first time during a skirmish near San Jacinto. Artillery commanders from both armies were severely wounded. Mexican commander of the "Golden Standard" Captain Fernando Urriza is relieved by Lieutenant Ygnacio Joaquin del Arenal. Texian commander Lieutenant Colonel James C. Neill is relieved by Inspector General Lieutenant Colonel George Washington Hockley. On April 21 at 4:30p CST, the Twin Sisters, positioned in the center of the formation, initiated the Battle of San Jacinto with the first volley into Mexican forces. With major combat over in 18 minutes, a 1.5:1 strength ratio, and a 28:1 casualty ratio, it is considered by some historians among the most one-sided victories in history. The Twins Sisters final role in the revolution were providing security for the 300 prisoners of war during the Treaties of Velasco.

=== Antebellum ===
As of 2019, only a few primary sources have been unrecovered mentioning the Twin Sisters following the Texas Revolution. Adding to the extensive confusion of the historical record is the introduction of replicas purchased by various Texas cities, conflation of other artillery by various Texas military units, and the annexation of the Texas Army and Navy into the United States Armed Forces in 1845.

==== Mexican Invasions of 1842 ====
The last documented mention of the Twin Sisters occurred during the ongoing military raids and expeditions that followed the Texas Revolution, including a report ordering them to defense in 1842, and a work order in 1843, indicating they may have been used:

- 23 June 1842, ordered to San Felipe de Austin by Secretary of War & Marine George W. Hockley "to be in readiness for transportation to any point that may be designated in opening the mediated campaign."
  - Note: Hockley was the commanding officer of artillery during the Battle of San Jacinto
- 24 March 1843, ordered by the Ordnance Department to Frederick Schierman for various maintenance.

==== Houston Twins ====
- 13 December 1841, used for Sam Houston's inauguration as President of the Republic of Texas
- 1853, used for BBB&C Railway's dedication ceremony
- 1859, used for Sam Houston's inauguration as Governor of Texas

== Presumed final sightings ==
- 8 February 1864 — dispatch by Confederate Lieutenant Walter W. Blow stating Twin Sisters were in transit to Colonel John S. Ford in San Antonio
  - Ford took six cannons to Brownsville (presumably including the Twin Sisters) and used them in the Battle of Palmito Ranch
  - Twin Sisters were left in Fort Brown after Ford learning outcome of Battle of Appomattox Court House
- 30 July 1865 — journal entry by Union Corporal M. A. Sweetman saw them in a scrap pile in Houston

== Disappearance theories ==
Date of Loss	Theory	Date of Theory	Theorist	Primary Source Reference
July 1836	Lost to quicksand ~40 miles outside of Goliad	5/1/1917	Dr. Joseph Osterman Dyer	
15 August 1865	Buried by Henry North Graves, Sol Thomas, Ira Pruitt, Jack Taylor, and John Barnett in the woods near Harrisburg	6/28/1921	Henry North Graves	
1865	Melted for scrap by Union Army	6/15/2010	Jeffrey W. Hunt	

== Notable search efforts ==
Date	Location	Person / Organization	Result(s)	Ref
1849	PSA	Professor R.C. Matthewson / Texas State Gazette	First public inquiry after annexation	
1872	At-large	Colonel James Davidson, Adjutant General of Texas / Texas Military Department	Abandoned > fled Texas on corruption charges	
1878	At-large	Sarah and Cornelia Disney / wife and daughter of purported financier David T. Disney, who was the brother of Richard Disney, a veteran executed in the Goliad Massacre	First major effort to locate Twin Sisters	
1893	At-large	Daughters of the Republic of Texas	Uncovered Henry North Graves burial theory	
1908–1910	At-large	Captain William C. Day, Superintendent / Texas Public Buildings and Grounds		
1987–1997	Brays Bayou, Harrisburg	Clive Cussler / National Underwater and Marine Agency	Discovered the Zavala and potential location of the Invincible	

== Legacy ==
Twin Sisters exhibit, Great Hall, Texas Military Forces Museum

- 7 April 1895, Andrew Jackson Houston gifted Santa Anna's dagger, a war trophy from the Battle of San Jacinto, to Cincinnatians
- 2 March 1897, University of Texas students "borrowed" a Twin from the capitol and fired it for Texas Independence Day, establishing a Texas Exes tradition.
- 1910, Featured on Sam Houston Grave Monument designed by Pompeo Coppini
- 1939, Twin Sisters Monument featured at San Jacinto Monument
- 1985, Twin Sisters exhibit featured in the San Jacinto Museum. Fabricated by students at University of Houston College of Technology.
- 1992, Twin Sisters exhibit featured in the Great Hall of Texas Military Forces Museum. Fabricated in 1975 by the "Guard of the Republic" to celebrate the bicentennial of the United States.

== See also ==
- List of conflicts involving the Texas Military
- Awards and decorations of the Texas Military
