= Brownie (sculpture) =

Sculpture in Houston, Texas, U.S.

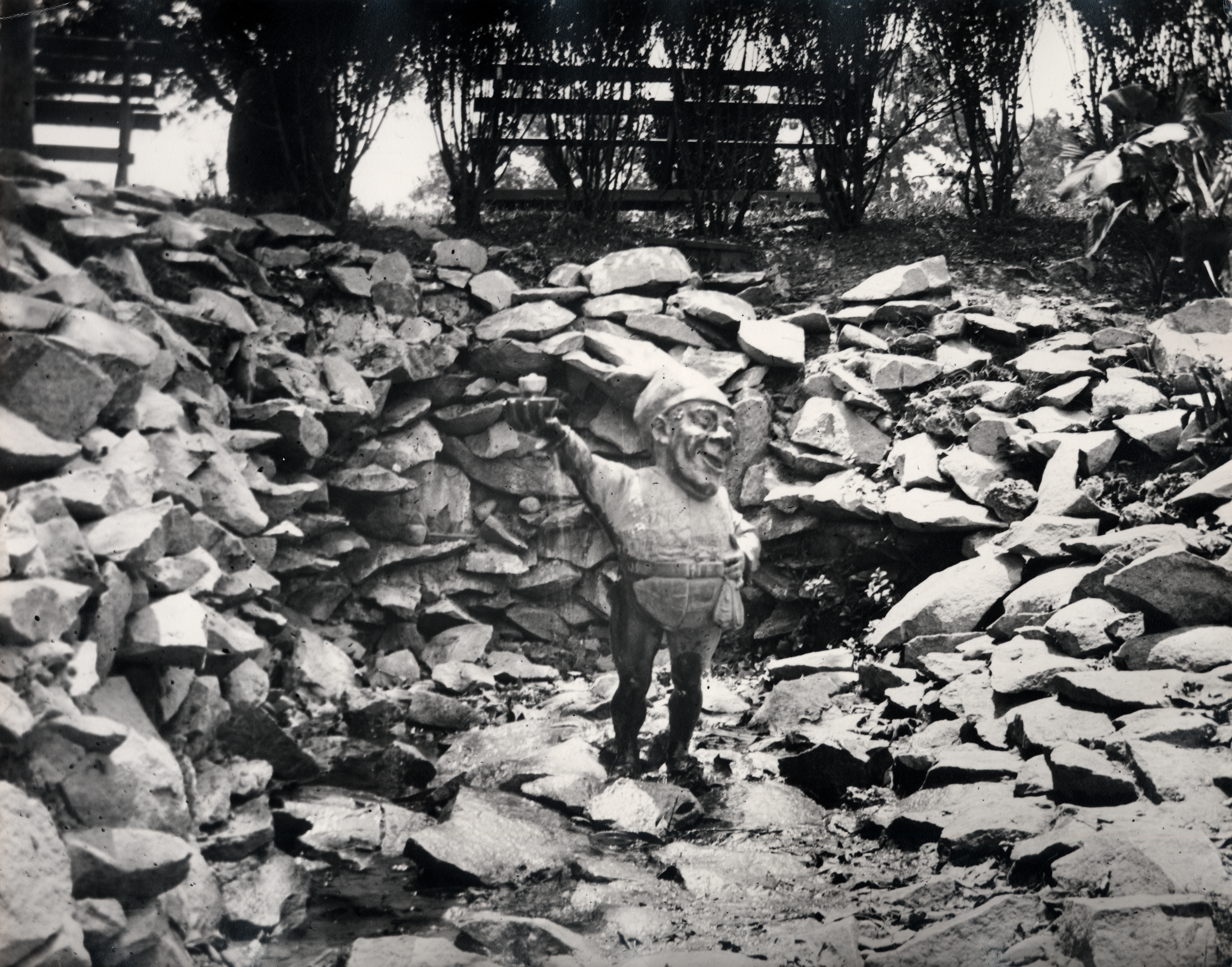
- 'Brownie' by Louis Amateis, photographed in 1907 at Sam Houston Park; currently at the Houston Zoo in Hermann Park.
- Artist: Louis Amateis
- Year: 1905
- Medium: Bronze sculpture
- Dimensions: 1.2 m (4 foot)
- Location: Houston, Texas, U.S.

Brownie is a bronze sculpture of a brownie (or broonie) with a pointed cap, holding up a bowl. It was created by Louis Amateis in 1905, and is one of the oldest sculptures in Houston. It is currently located at the Houston Zoo's Reflection Pool.

In folklore, a brownie comes out at night and does household chores, and in return people leave out a bowl with milk or cake for the brownie. At the time this sculpture was created, an illustrated children's series called The Brownies by Canadian author Palmer Cox, was very popular, and brownies were famously added to advertising and merchandising in a wide variety of goods, from the famous Kodak Brownie camera to carpets, china, and wallpaper. A brownie was an instantly recognized cultural reference at the time.

The sculpture originally was a drinking fountain financed by a penny drive held by the Fourth Ward division of the Houston Civic club, and it was installed in a rock-lined space at Sam Houston Park.

The park had only been officially established a few years before. In the few years before the sculpture was made, the park had a new bandstand near a children's playground with 100 benches. At that time, it was a vibrant park that hosted free concerts twice a week. On Sunday evenings, up to 4,000 people would attend the concerts. The Houston Civic club, which helped organize the free concerts, was the same group that funded this sculpture a few years later. This was a club of about fifty women who brought civic improvements to their respective wards. In 1906, Mrs. Ben Fort Smith took on the project of erecting a fountain (now the Brownie sculpture) at Sam Houston Park, and commissioned the work with Amateis.

Brownie first was a drinking fountain for children who were playing in a nearby frog pond. It was relocated to a rock grotto and then moved to the park's Valentine Lake (later named Brownie Fountain Glen). The park grew to have Victorian gardens, and the lake near Brownie had fountains and statues, and an island that was accessible by bridges.

In July 1935, Brownie was stolen and later found at a junk yard where it had been sold for $2.87 (equivalent to $69 in 2026). It was returned to the park. In 1937, after another theft and recovery, city officials put the sculpture into storage. About 30 years later, sculptor David Parsons renovated Brownie and replaced a missing arm, and then in 1968 it was relocated to the new Children's Zoo. In 2001, it was moved to its current location.

== Other works by Amateis in Texas ==
Amateis was an award-winning Italian sculptor who immigrated to the United States in 1883. He lived and worked in New York City and then Washington, D.C., but he was commissioned for several pieces in Texas. Unlike Brownie, many of his other pieces in the state were commissioned by philanthropists and organizations such as Galveston banker Henry Rosenberg and the United Daughters of the Confederacy (whose Galveston chapter was established and presided over by Rosenberg's second wife, Mollie Rosenberg) who favored the Beaux-Arts style that was popular in the years between the Civil War and World War I, especially for post-Civil War monuments commissioned in the North and South. This style is evident in Amateis's work and many of his other commissioned works in Texas were for "lost cause" Confederate monuments. These included:

- In Houston: Spirit of the Confederacy (1908)
- In Galveston, Texas:
  - Texas Heroes Monument (1900)
  - Statue of Henry Rosenberg (1906), at the Rosenberg Library
  - Marble bust of Major A.J. Walker, at the Rosenberg Library
  - Monument to Major General John B. Magruder (n.d.), at his grave
  - Dignified Resignation (1894–1912), at the county courthouse
- In Corsicana, Texas: The Call to Arms (1907–1908), at the county courthouse

== See also ==
- 1905 in art
- List of public art in Houston
