= Harkort =

Harkort is a surname. Notable people with the surname include:

- Eduard Harkort (1797–1836), German-born colonel in the Texas Revolution
- Friedrich Harkort (1793–1880), German industrialist
- Gustav Harkort (1795–1865), German entrepreneur and railroad pioneer
- Louisa Catharina Harkort (1718–1795), German ironmaster
