= Amateis =

Amateis is a surname. Notable people with the surname include:

- Edmond Amateis (1897–1981), American sculptor, son of Louis
- Louis Amateis (1855–1913), American sculptor
