= World War I Monument =

War memorial in Houston, Texas, U.S.

- Interactive map of World War I Monument
- Location: Sam Houston Park, Houston, Texas
- Coordinates: 29.75915°N 95.371318°W
- Type: War memorial
- Material: Bronze and granite

The World War I Monument is a war memorial by an unknown creator, installed outside the Heritage Society, adjacent to Houston's Sam Houston Park, in the U.S. state of Texas.

The bronze and granite memorial commemorates local soldiers who died in World War I, and features a bronze plaque depicting an eagle and displaying a list of names, set within a granite block.

== See also ==
- List of public art in Houston
- World War II Memorial (Houston)
