= Edward Harcourt =

Edward Harcourt may refer to:

- Edward Venables-Vernon-Harcourt (1757–1847), Bishop of Carlisle and Archbishop of York
- Ed Harcourt (born 1977), British singer-songwriter
- Edward Harcourt (philosopher), British philosopher
- Edward William Harcourt (1825–1891), English politician, traveller and amateur ornithologist
- Eduard Harkort (1797–1836), German-born colonel in the Texas Revolution
