= Spirit of the Confederacy =

Bronze sculpture in Houston, Texas, erected by the United Daughters of the Confederacy

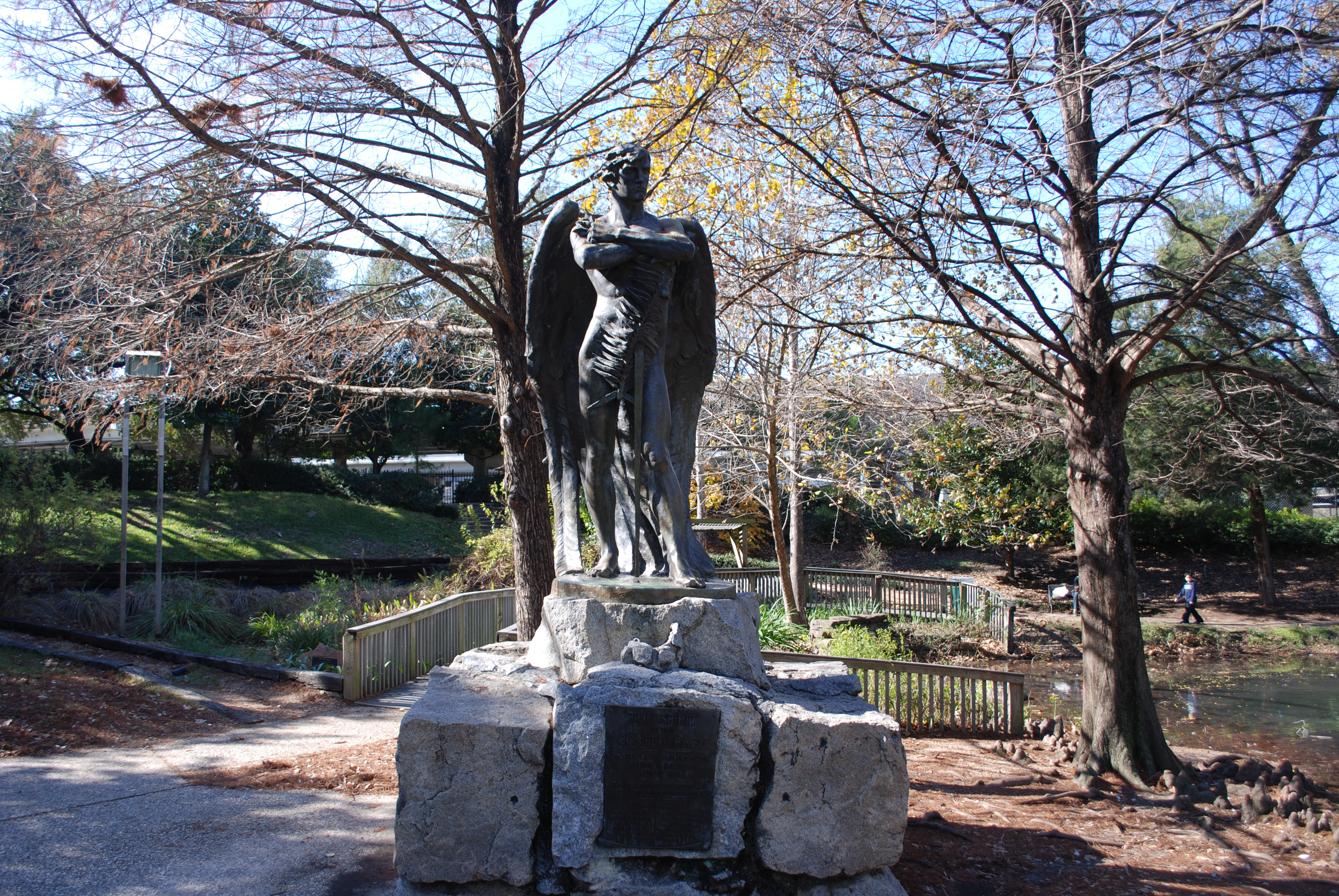
- The monument in 2013
- Artist: Louis Amateis
- Year: 1908
- Medium: Bronze sculpture
- Subject: Angel
- Location: Houston, Texas, United States
- 29°45′37″N 95°22′21″W

Spirit of the Confederacy, also known as the Confederacy Monument, is an outdoor bronze sculpture depicting an angel holding a sword and palm branch by Louis Amateis, installed in Houston's Sam Houston Park, in the U.S. state of Texas. It was erected in 1908 by a local chapter of the United Daughters of the Confederacy. The statue was removed from the park in 2020 and relocated to the Houston Museum of African American Culture.

== History ==
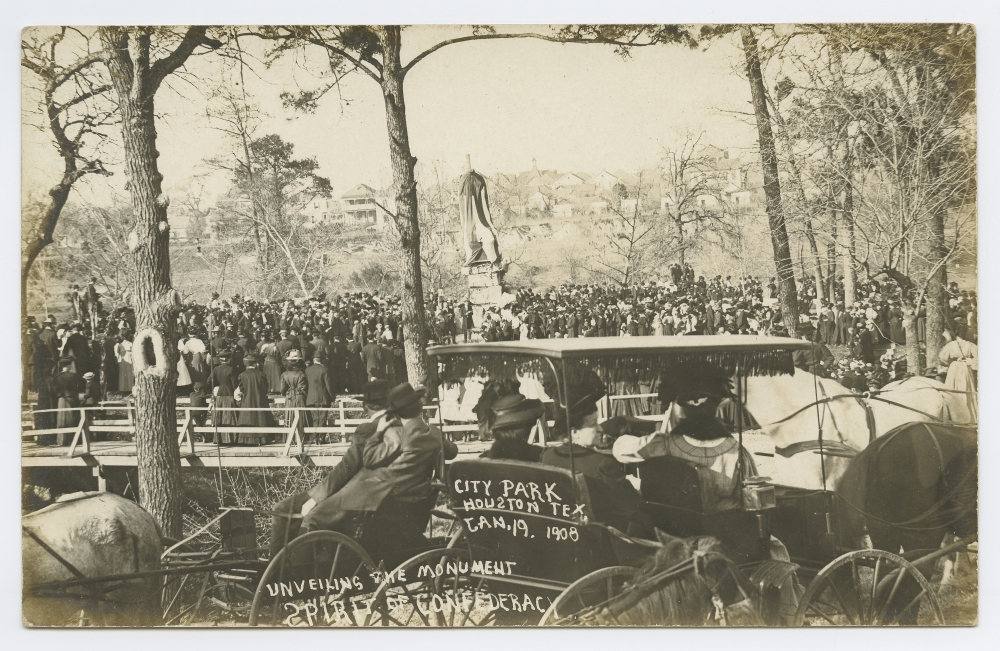
Unveiling in City Park, 1908

The memorial was installed by the Robert E. Lee Chapter #186 of the United Daughters of the Confederacy and unveiled on his birthday in January 1908. It had taken the Daughters nine years to collect the necessary $7,500. The statue sits atop a granite pedestal. The memorial is dedicated "To all heroes of the South who fought for the Principles of States Rights".

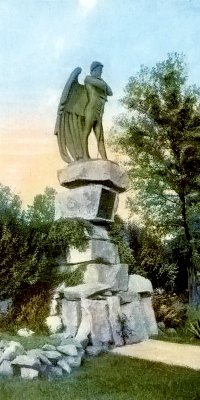
Illustration of the monument

The monument was put up at a time when Houston was a re-segregated city; the city had enacted separate streetcar compartments for whites and blacks in 1903, and "the following year, thousands of black voters were removed from the electorate when the city adopted a $2.50 poll tax". At the unveiling, Joseph Chappell Hutcheson, a Confederate veteran and Democratic representative in the Texas House of Representatives and the United States House of Representatives, said, "Look upon this masterpiece wrought in bronze, this marvel of art to typify the spirit and genius of that Confederacy we once so fondly loved and still so fondly cherish". A 1911 history of the city said it has "done much to preserve the memory of the Confederate soldiers who have passed over the river and to care for and comfort those who are still on this side".

=== Removal and relocation ===
Doubts about the monument were expressed in 2015 after the racially motivated Charleston church shooting, with one citizen asking, "Is it something that we want to take pride in anymore when so many people are offended by it?" Protesters said the statue celebrated slavery and racism, while others argued that removing the monument meant removing history. The controversy was reignited in 2017 after the Unite the Right rally in Charlottesville. The monument is one of two monuments in Houston dedicated to the Confederacy; the other is the statue of Richard W. Dowling.

On June 11, 2020, the City of Houston announced plans to relocate the monument as well as the Dowling statue. While the plans to relocate the statues had been formulating for some time, the events surrounding the murder of former Houston resident George Floyd prompted the mayor and task force to move forward. The monument was removed on June 16, 2020, and arrived at the Houston Museum of African American Culture on August 18.

== See also ==
- 1908 in art
- List of Confederate monuments and memorials
- List of monuments and memorials removed during the George Floyd protests
- List of monuments erected by the United Daughters of the Confederacy
- List of public art in Houston
- Texas Heroes Monument, Galveston, Texas
