= World War II Memorial (Houston) =

War memorial in Houston, Texas, U.S.

Coordinates: 29.79044°N 95.39771°W

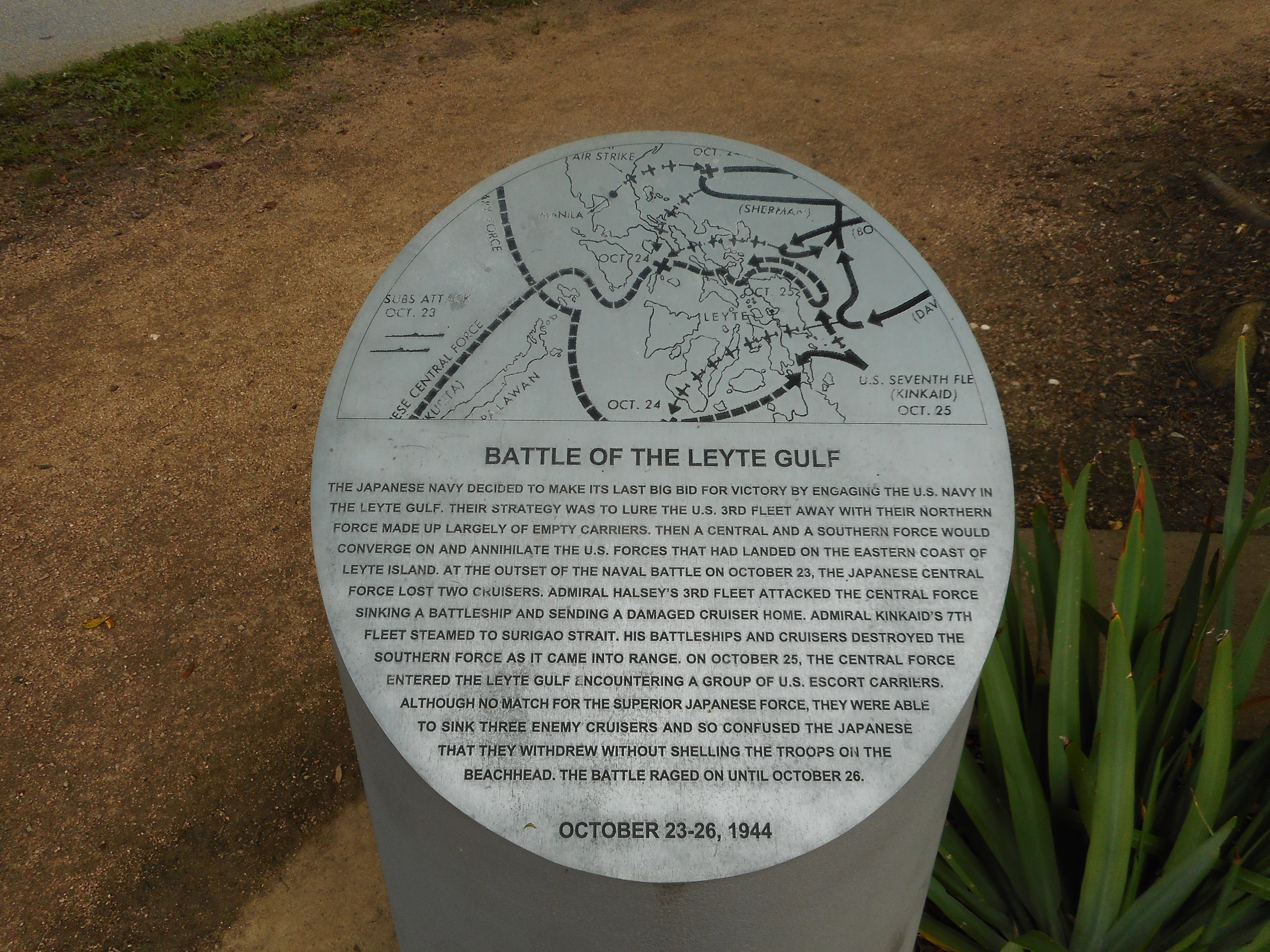
Part of the memorial in 2018

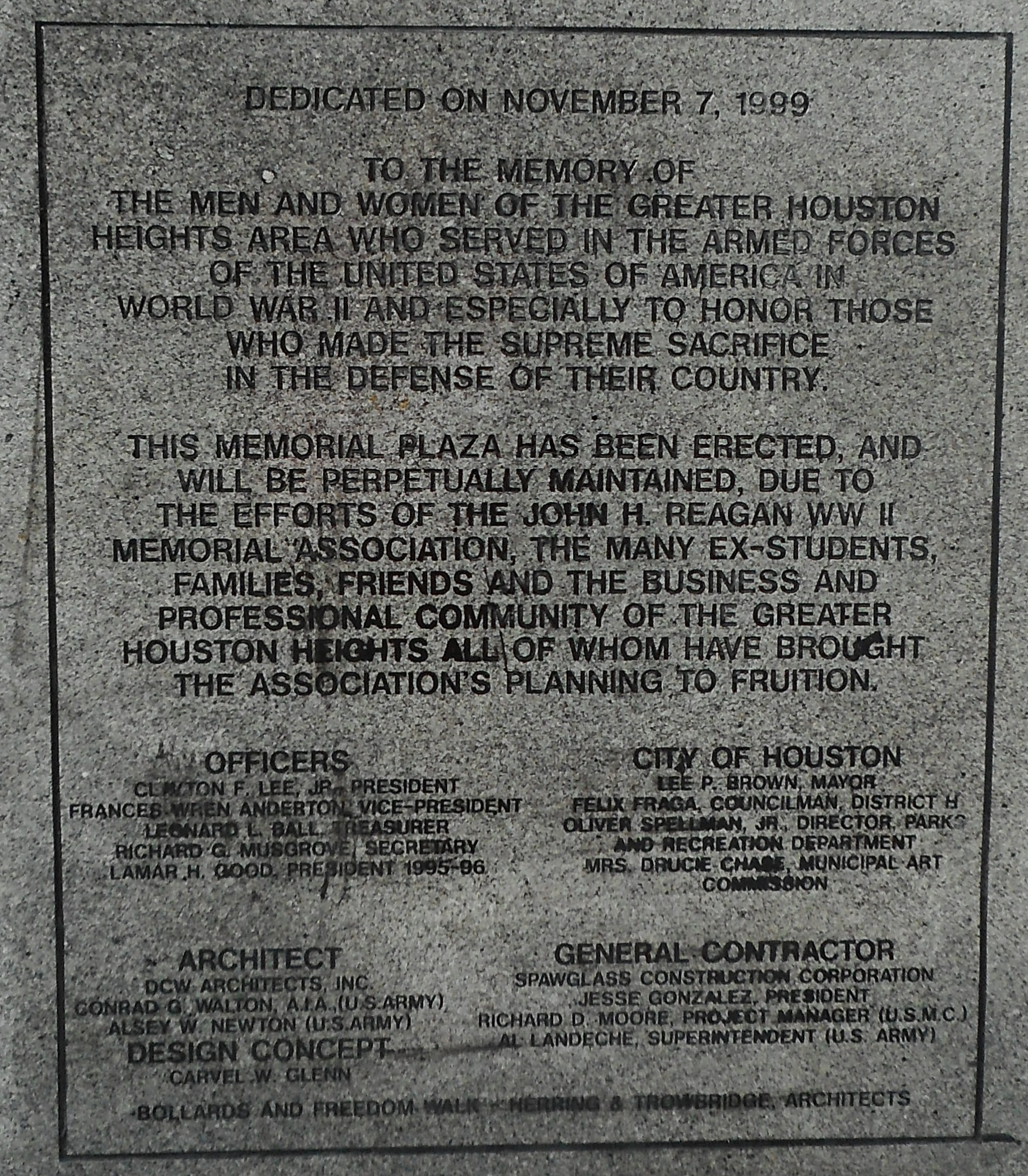
One of the inscriptions, 2018

The World War II Memorial, also known as World War II Memorial Plaza, is a granite war memorial by Conrad G. Walton, installed in Houston's Heights Boulevard Park, in the U.S. state of Texas.

== See also ==
- List of public art in Houston
- World War I Monument
