= Alexander Hodge Memorial =

Stone memorial in Sam Houston Park, Houston, Texas, U.S.

- Interactive map of Alexander Hodge Memorial
- Location: Sam Houston Park, Houston, Texas, U.S.
- Coordinates: 29°45′34″N 95°22′18″W
- Completion date: 1908; 118 years ago
- Dedicated date: 1912; 114 years ago
- Dedicated to: Alexander Hodge

The Alexander Hodge Memorial is an outdoor 1908 stone monument, installed in Sam Houston Park, Houston, in the U.S. state of Texas. The memorial, dedicated in 1912, was erected by the Lady Washington Chapter of the Daughters of the American Revolution to recognize Hodge as "a hero of two republics".
