= Sam Houston Park =

Park in Houston, Texas, USA

Coordinates: 29.760°N 95.372°W

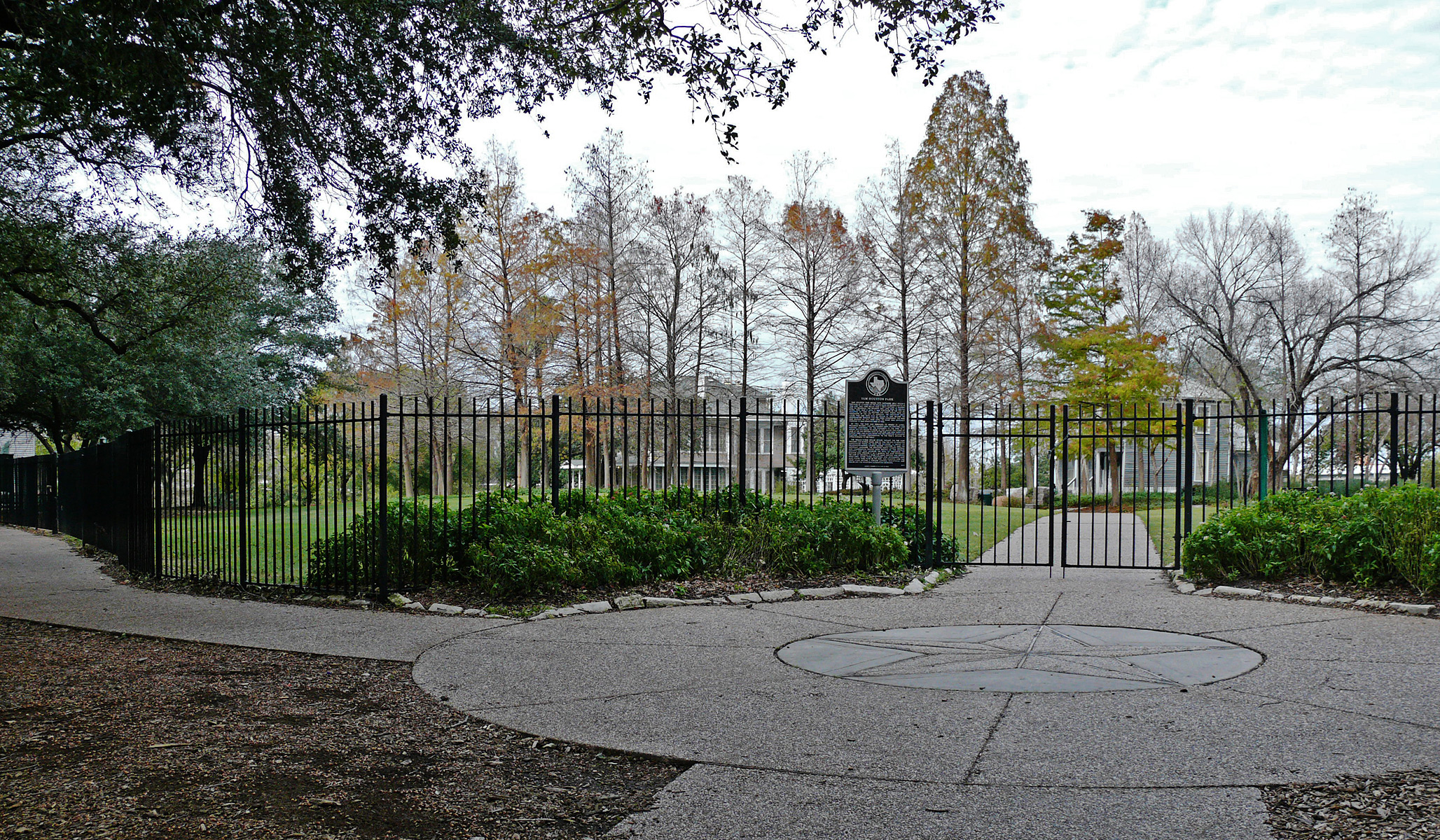
Main Entrance to Sam Houston Park

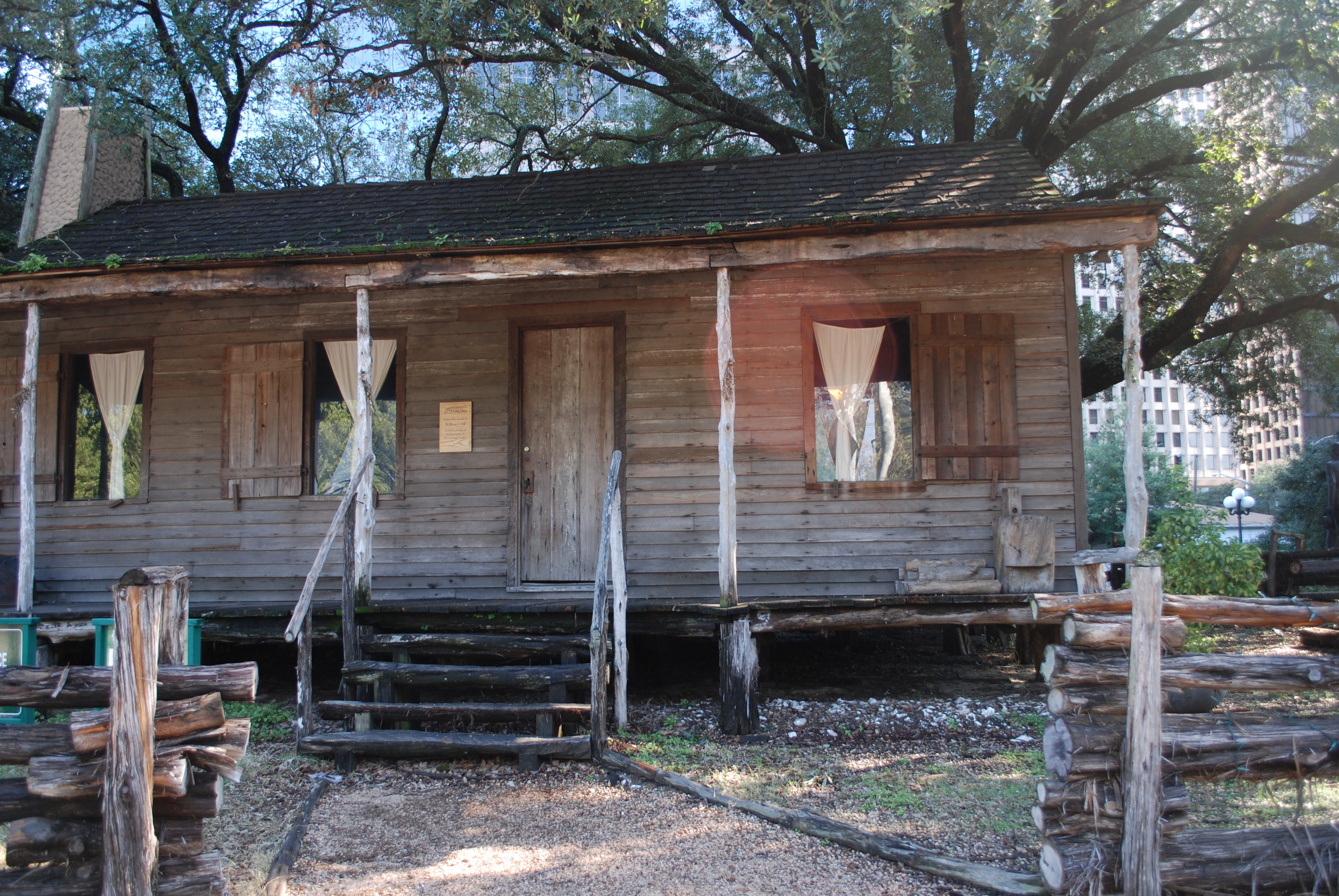
The Old Place, the oldest remaining structure in Harris County, Texas

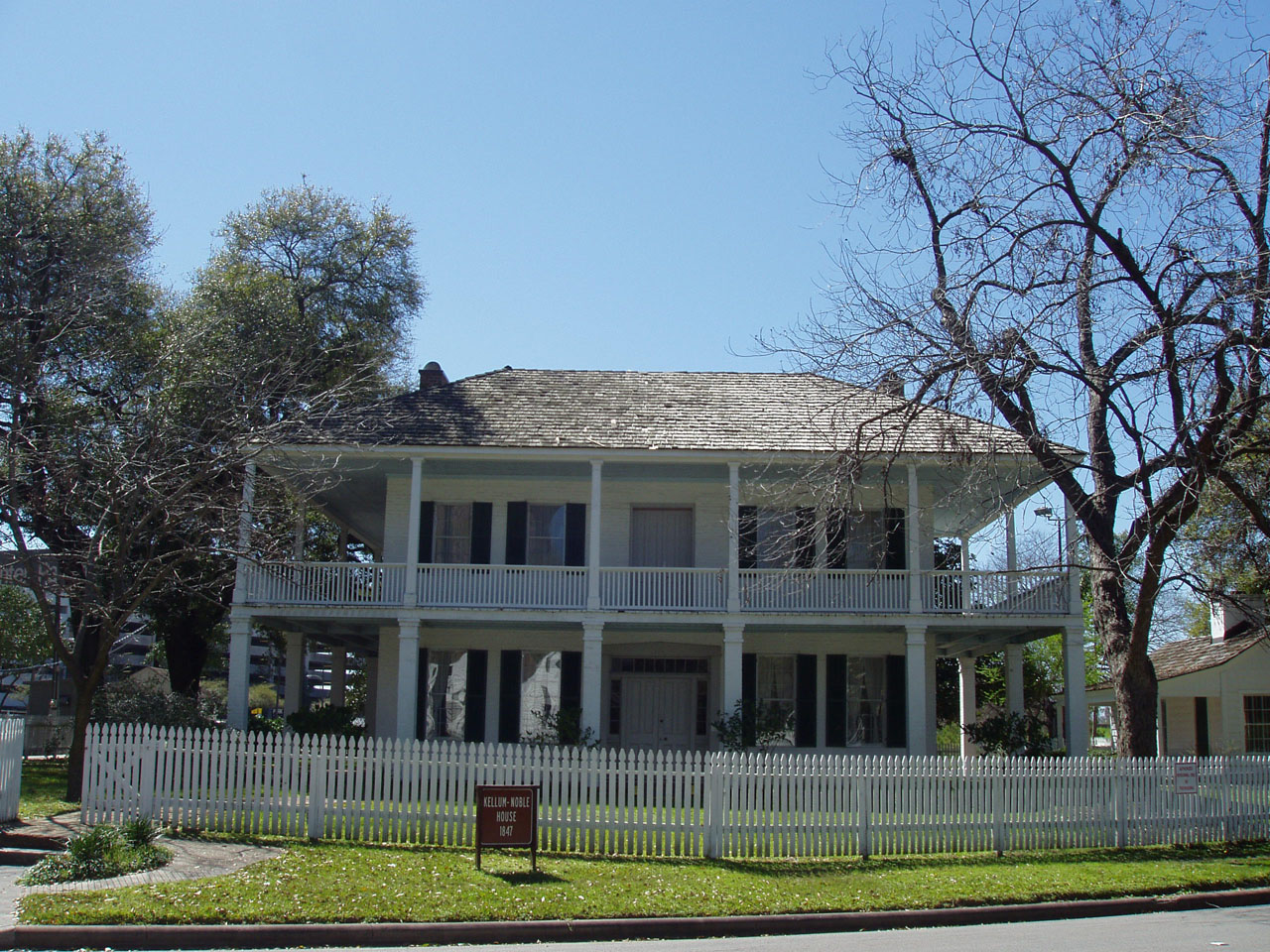
The Kellum-Noble House is a Historic American Building in Sam Houston Park

Sam Houston Park is an urban park located in downtown Houston, Texas, United States, dedicated to the buildings and culture of Houston's past. The park, which was the first to be established in the city, was developed on land purchased by former Mayor Sam Brashear in 1900.

== History ==
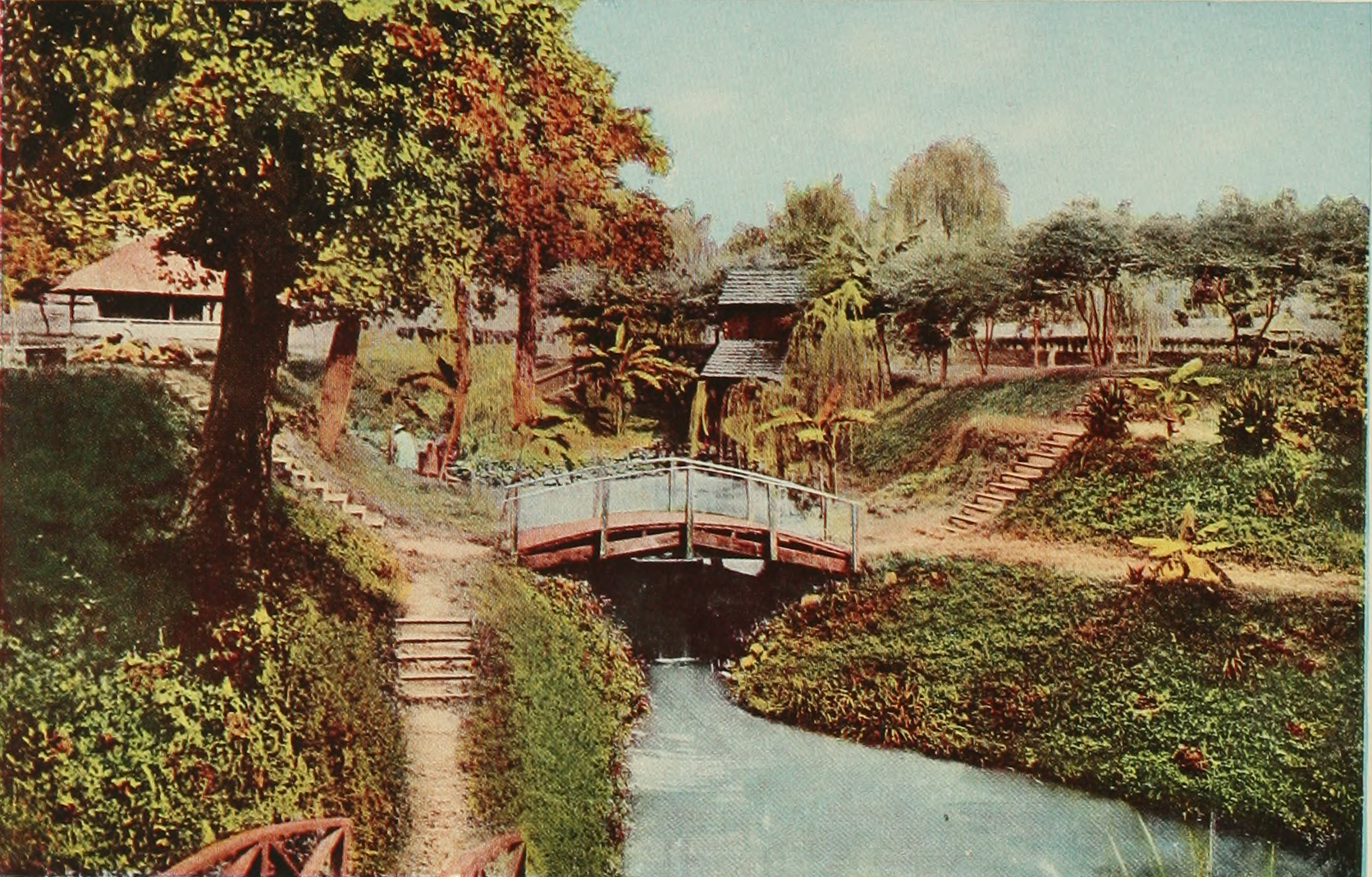
Old Mill, an area in Sam Houston Park in 1913

Mayor Samuel H. Brashear appointed Houston's first park committee to oversee the establishment of a city park in 1899. The 20 acres (81,000 m^{2}) chosen for the park was landscaped into a Victorian-styled village, with footpaths leading past an old mill and across a bridge that traversed a small stream. The park also included a 52-year-old house that had long been used as a school.

Brashear acquired the park land from three owners. Part of the land (then north of Buffalo Bayou) was So Young's former brickyard. Noble and Byers had owned the portion south of the bayou. John Maxey, the City Engineer designed the original park, which included the Kellum-Noble House on the site. A drive was in the original plan, with a bridge over the bayou to Young's Avenue through the former brickyard. Other improvements included a bandstand, a pavilion, and a conservatory. Adding to the landscaping of the park was a pond and an arbor.

== The Heritage Society ==
The Heritage Society was founded by Houstonians Faith Bybee, Harvin Moore and Marie Phelps in 1954, and Sam Houston Park has been its home, ever since.

The purpose of the Society is to preserve the history of the community and region through preservation and restoration of historic structures, exhibition of historical artifacts, and presentation of educational programs which focus on Houston and Harris County's diverse past, and its relationship to the present and future.

Also located in Sam Houston Park, at the corner of Bagby and Lamar Streets, is a small museum, the Heritage Society Museum, which is dedicated to preserving Houston's history.

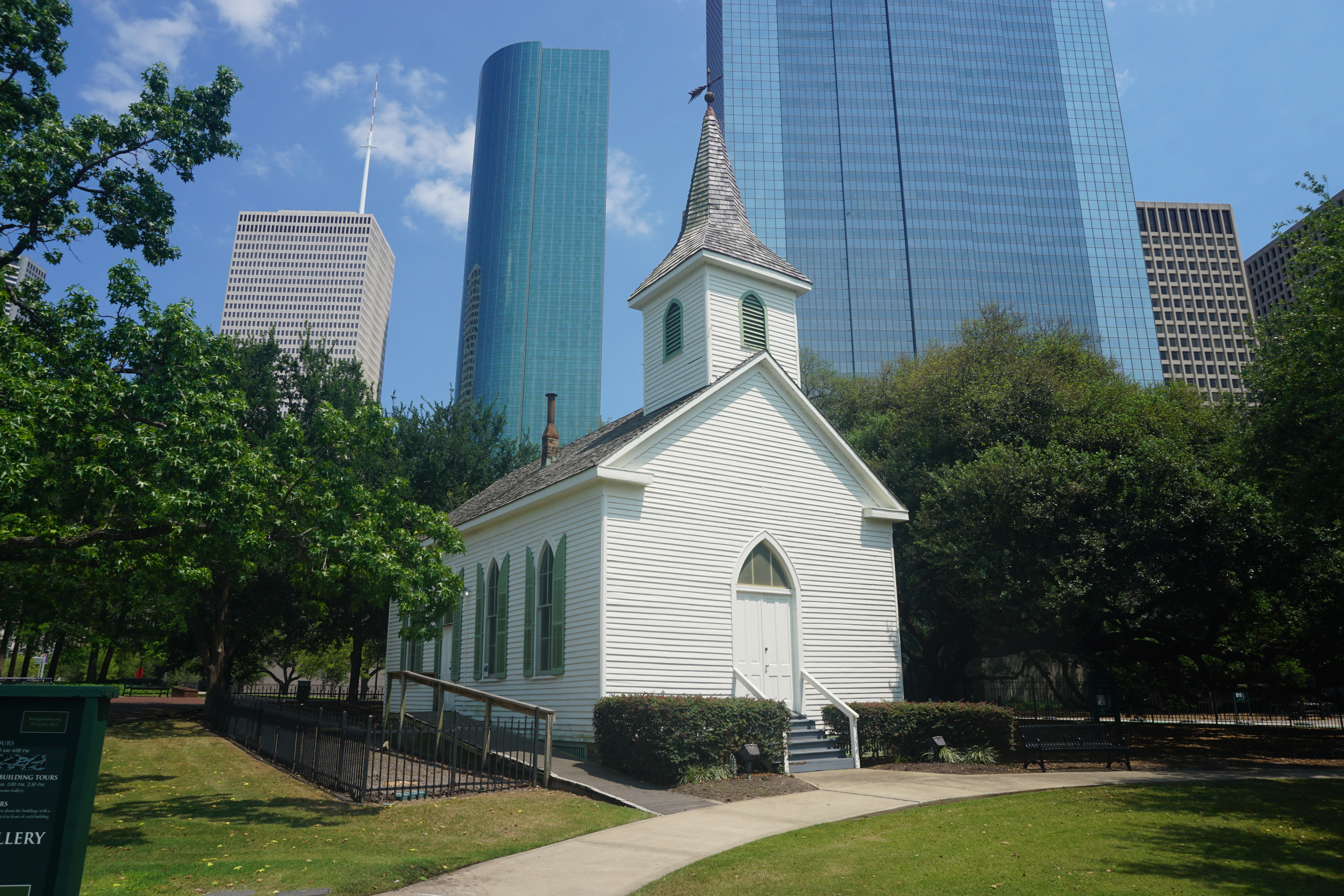
St. John Church, Sam Houston Park, Houston, Texas

== Historic buildings ==
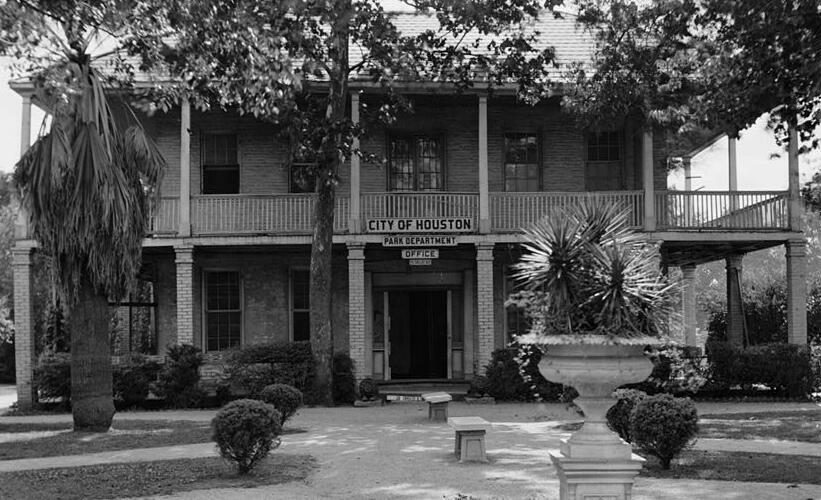
The Kellum-Noble House, 1936 photograph

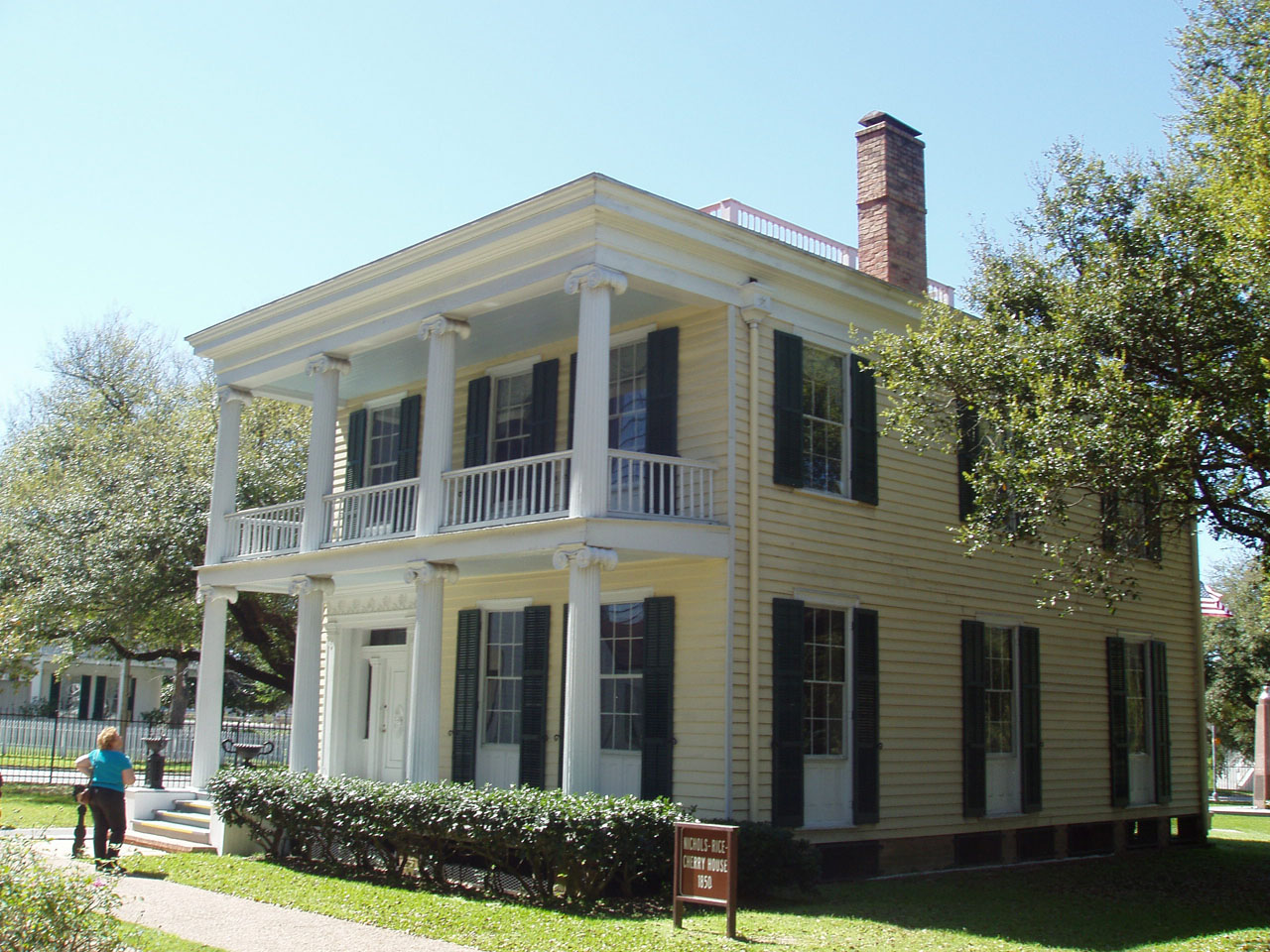
Nichols-Rice-Cherry House

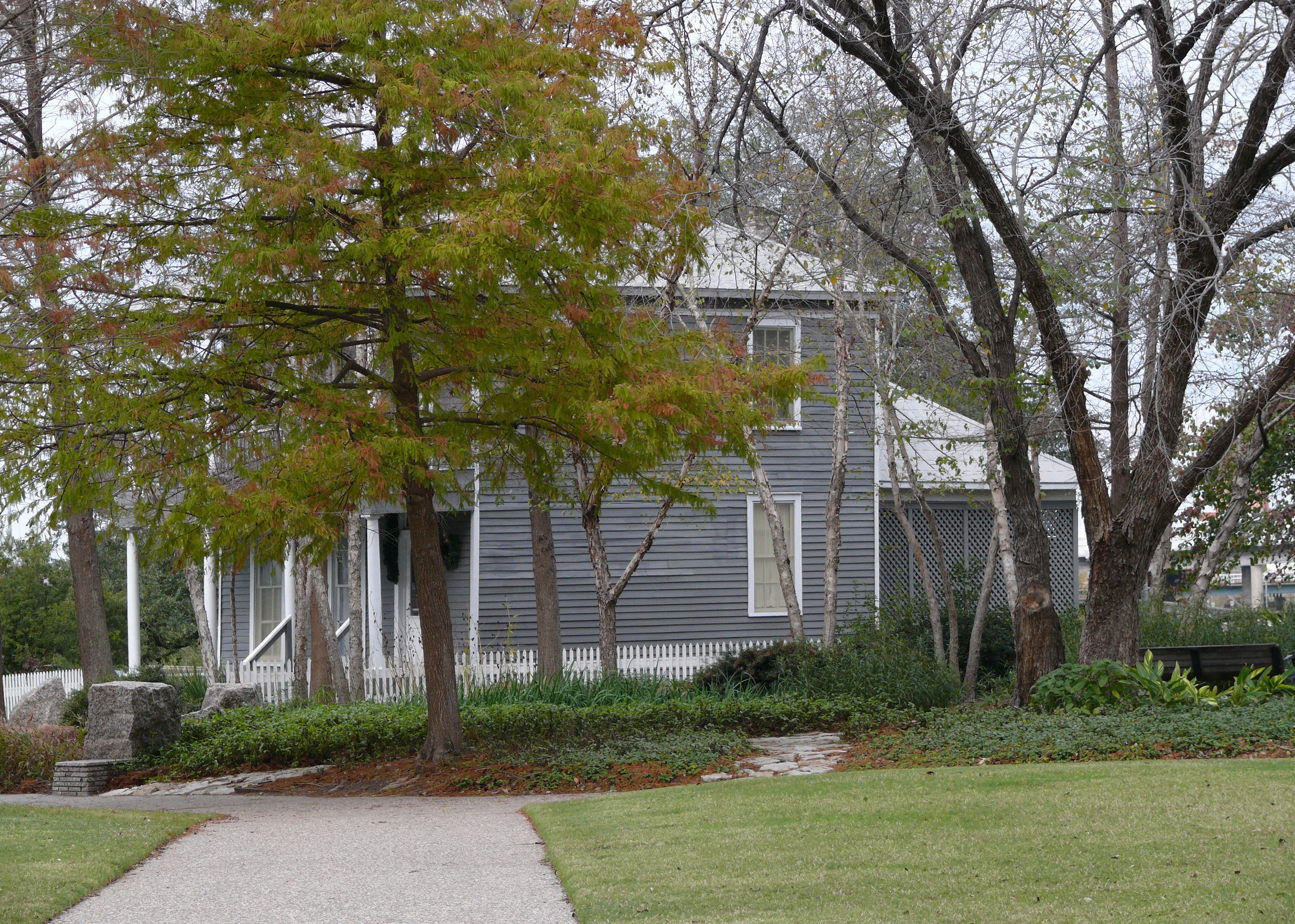
Jack Yates House. Now in Sam Houston Park. Greek Revival style, with a symmetrical, full facade first and second story porch supported by Tuscan columns.

Several historic homes are located in the park. The buildings are representative of many eras, from a pre-Texas Revolution cabin to an 1891 church built by German and Swiss immigrants, including the Kellum-Noble House, Houston's oldest brick dwelling, which was built by Nathaniel Kellum in 1847. Guided tours of the restored buildings are available from the Heritage Society.

=== Old Place ===
The Old Place is a log cabin probably built by John R. Williams, an Austin colonist, about 1823, and thought to be the oldest remaining structure in Harris County. It was moved from its original location on the west bank of Clear Creek in 1973 and remained at the west edge of the Park, on the shore of the pond, until September 2003, when it was relocated to higher ground on the east side of the Park. Rising waters from Buffalo Bayou had flooded the building numerous times over the years, and during Tropical Storm Allison in June 2001, floodwaters reached the roof.

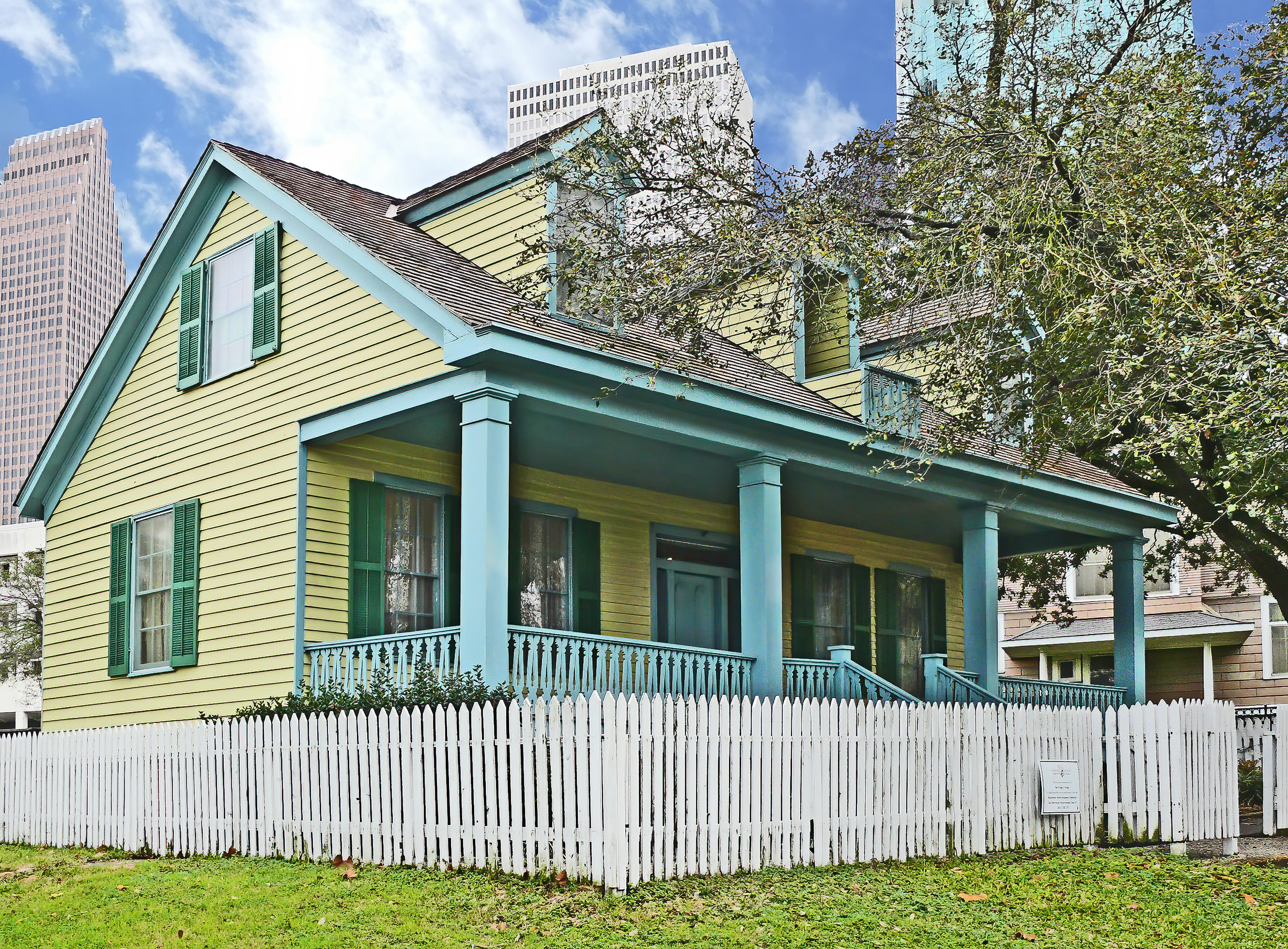
San Felipe Cottage in Sam Houston Park

=== Kellum-Noble House ===
While the Old Place is the oldest building in Sam Houston Park, the Kellum-Noble House is the oldest extant building from Houston. Part of its name is taken from Nathaniel Kellum, who built the house in 1847. Nathaniel Kellum built the house adjacent to his brickyard. Kellum sold the house to Benjamin Shepherd in 1850, who sold it to Zerviah Noble the next year, who used it as a school for primary education. She taught at the school until 1899.

The house is constructed with two chambers (a "double-pen") separated by a breezeway, and the house is encircled by its double gallery. The City of Houston acquired the house as part of the purchase of land for the park in 1899. The Harris County Heritage Society saved the building in 1954 and commissioned its renovation by Harvin C. Moore before opening it as a county museum four years later. The Kellum-Noble House reopened in 2019.

=== Nichols-Rice-Cherry House ===
The Nichols-Rice-Cherry House was built circa 1850. It was once located across the street from the Harris County Courthouse. Houston merchant Ebeneezer Nichols built the house, and soon after sold it to his junior business partner, William Marsh Rice. The house did not always remain at the location at Courthouse Square. Emma Richardson Cherry, a Houston artist, acquired the house, restored it, and moved it to 508 Fargo in the Montrose area. The Heritage Society moved the Greek Revival house to Sam Houston Park, and restored the building to many of its features when Rice owned it, but also set up a room to reflect Cherry's art studio.

Originally constructed at the northwest corner of Congress Avenue and San Jacinto Street, opposite the Harris County Courthouse, it featured a wrap-around double gallery supported on both levels by Ionic columns. Later maps of the house suggest addition to the rear of the house, perhaps for a kitchen and servants' quarters.

After the Cherrys acquired the house for $25 in 1896, they moved it to Montrose and resided there. In 1934, Albert Howell Howse's team of architects drafted detailed drawings of the house. Emma Cherry lived in the house until her death in 1954. The Harris County Heritage Society purchased the house in 1957, moved it to Sam Houston Park, where Harvin Cooper Moore conducted a new architectural survey and did restoration work.

=== Fourth Ward Cottage ===
The Fourth Ward Cottage was originally housing for a German family around the middle of the nineteenth century. Its original site was 908 Robin, west of the park in the Fourth Ward. After the Civil War, African Americans moved into this neighborhood now known as Freedman's Town. The current form of the house is a hybrid: a concatenation of an Arcadian cottage in the front abutted to a two-room cottage in the back to resemble the shotgun houses in the former neighborhood. The Heritage Society move the house to Sam Houston Park in 2002.

=== San Felipe Cottage ===
The San Felipe Cottage dates from 1868. The house was constructed at the present-day 313 West Dallas (formerly San Felipe Road). It is an example of common architecture employed by German settlers. The house was moved to Sam Houston Park in 1962.

=== Pillot House ===
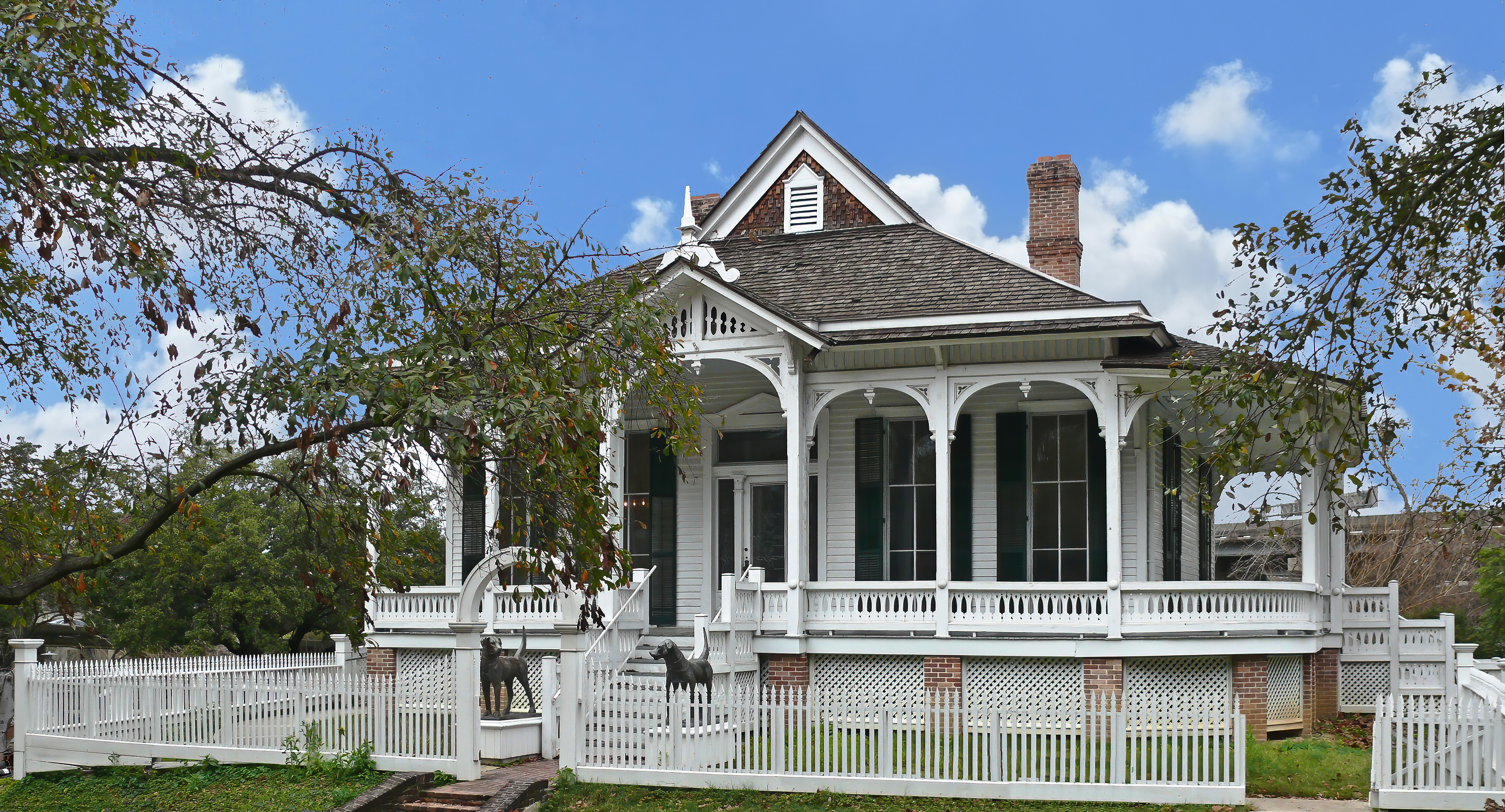
Pillot House in Sam Houston Park

The Pillot House is named for its owner, Eugene Pillot, a Houston businessman. Pillot arrived in the United States with his parents before they immigrated to the Republic of Texas in 1837. The Pillots ran a lumber business in Houston, and developed Pillot's Opera House. They also built the Pillot Building (1858) on Congress Avenue at Fannin Street. The Pillot House was built in 1868 for Eugene and Zeolide Pillot, where they reared six children. The house conveyed to other generations of Pillots until they donated the structure to the Heritage Society in 1965. The Pillot House was a trendsetter for Houston homes, with innovations such as an attached kitchen, gas lighting, and closets. The house included features to add comfort during harsh summer heat. Two cast iron dogs stand in front of the home were originally cast by Janes, Kirtland & Co. (the iron foundry that built the U.S. Capitol Dome)

=== Yates House ===
The Yates House is another house in Sam Houston Park that was originally located in Freedmen's Town. John Henry Yates originally built the house at 1318 Andrews in 1870. A former enslaved person, Yates was a minister and an educator in Houston. The simple double-gallery on its frontage defines the form of the house as a type of Greek Revival. Descendants of Yates donated the house and the Heritage Society moved it to the park in 1994.

=== St. John's Church ===
St. John Church was originally built in northwest Harris County. The 1891 building was relocated to Sam Houston Park in 1968. Though originally serving German Lutherans, the architectural style was typical of churches of the American South. Its footprint is rectangular and has a gabled roof with a bell tower.

=== Baker Family Playhouse ===
The Baker Family Playhouse is located in Sam Houston Park behind Nichols-Rice-Cherry House. James A. Baker constructed the playhouse for his daughter Alice c.1893.

=== Staiti House ===
The Staiti House was built in 1905 for Henry Staiti as an investment property. The house was originally located in the Westmoreland Place neighborhood, with additions and renovations in 1915. The house was known for some modern conveniences, such as electric lighting and a built-in refrigerator. The Heritage Society moved the house to Sam Houston Park in 1986.

== Monuments ==
- World War I Monument
- Spirit of the Confederacy: Relocated to the Houston Museum of African American Culture
- Alexander Hodge Memorial

== Gallery: Postcard scenes in Sam Houston Park ==
(c. means "circa" which means "around".)

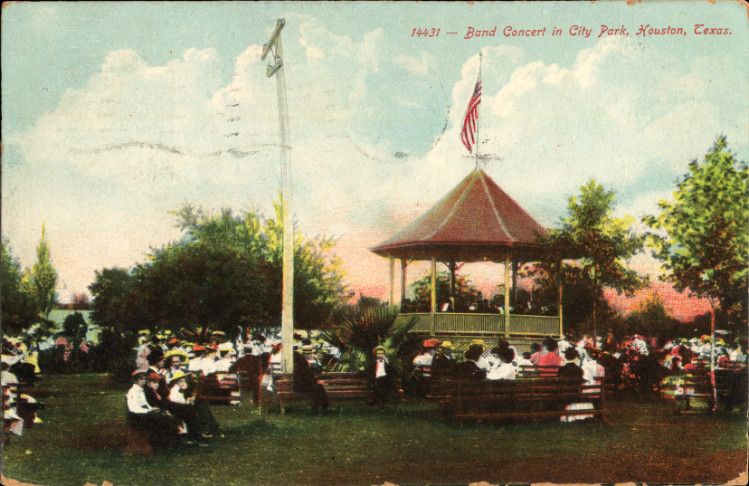
Band concert (c. 1910)

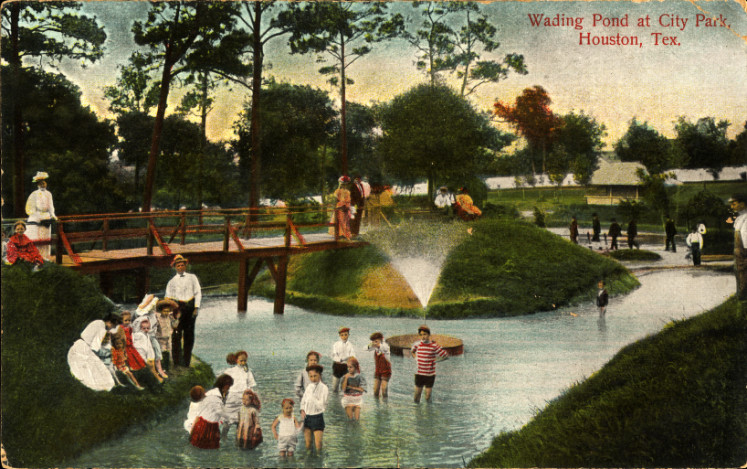
Wading pond (c. 1900-1924)

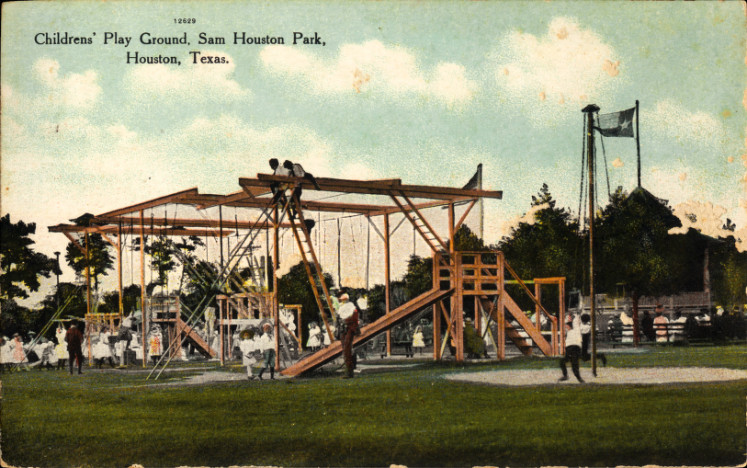
Children's playground (c. 1909)

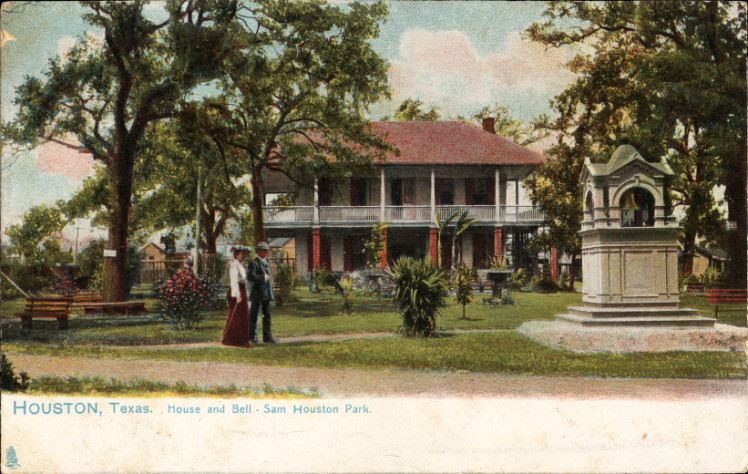
House and bell (c. 1900-1924)

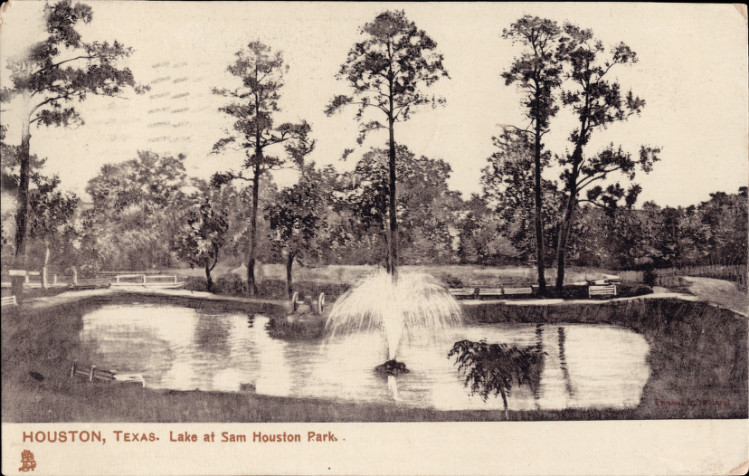
Lake (c. 1907)

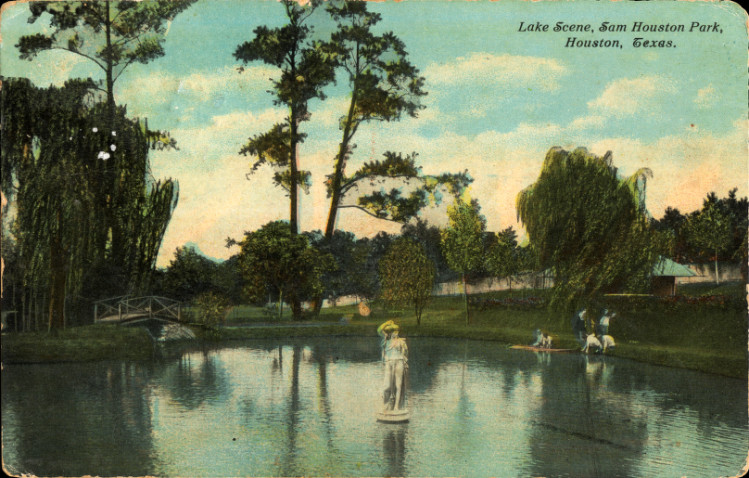
Lake scene (c. 1911)

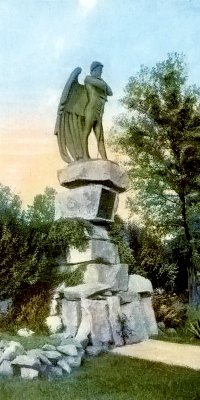
Spirit of the Confederacy

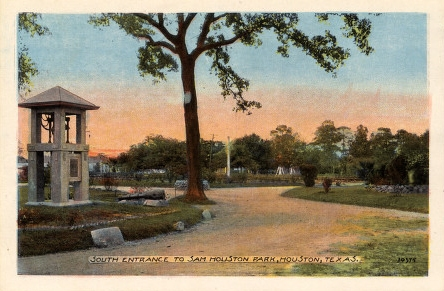
South Entrance (c. 1912-1924)

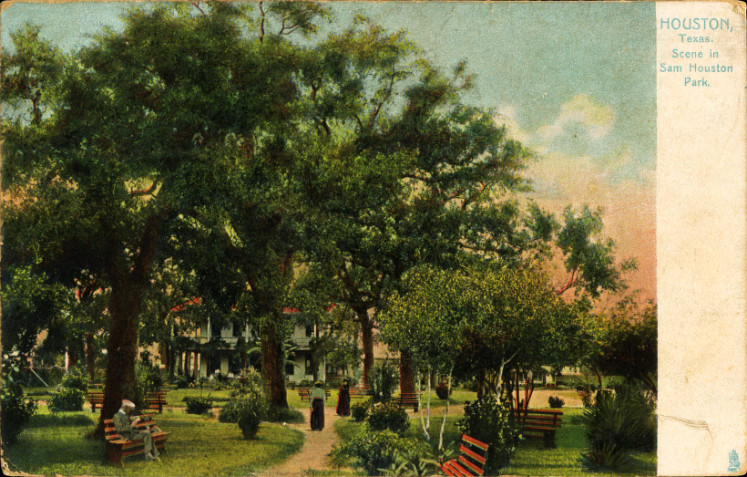
Scene (c. 1907)

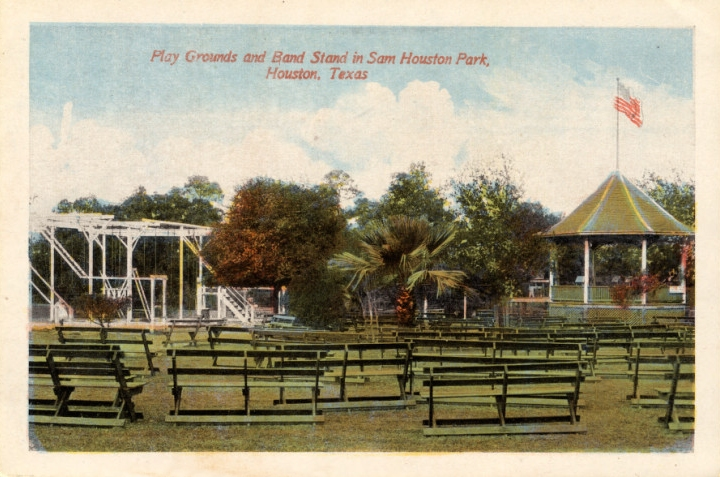
Play grounds and band stand (c. 1912-1924)

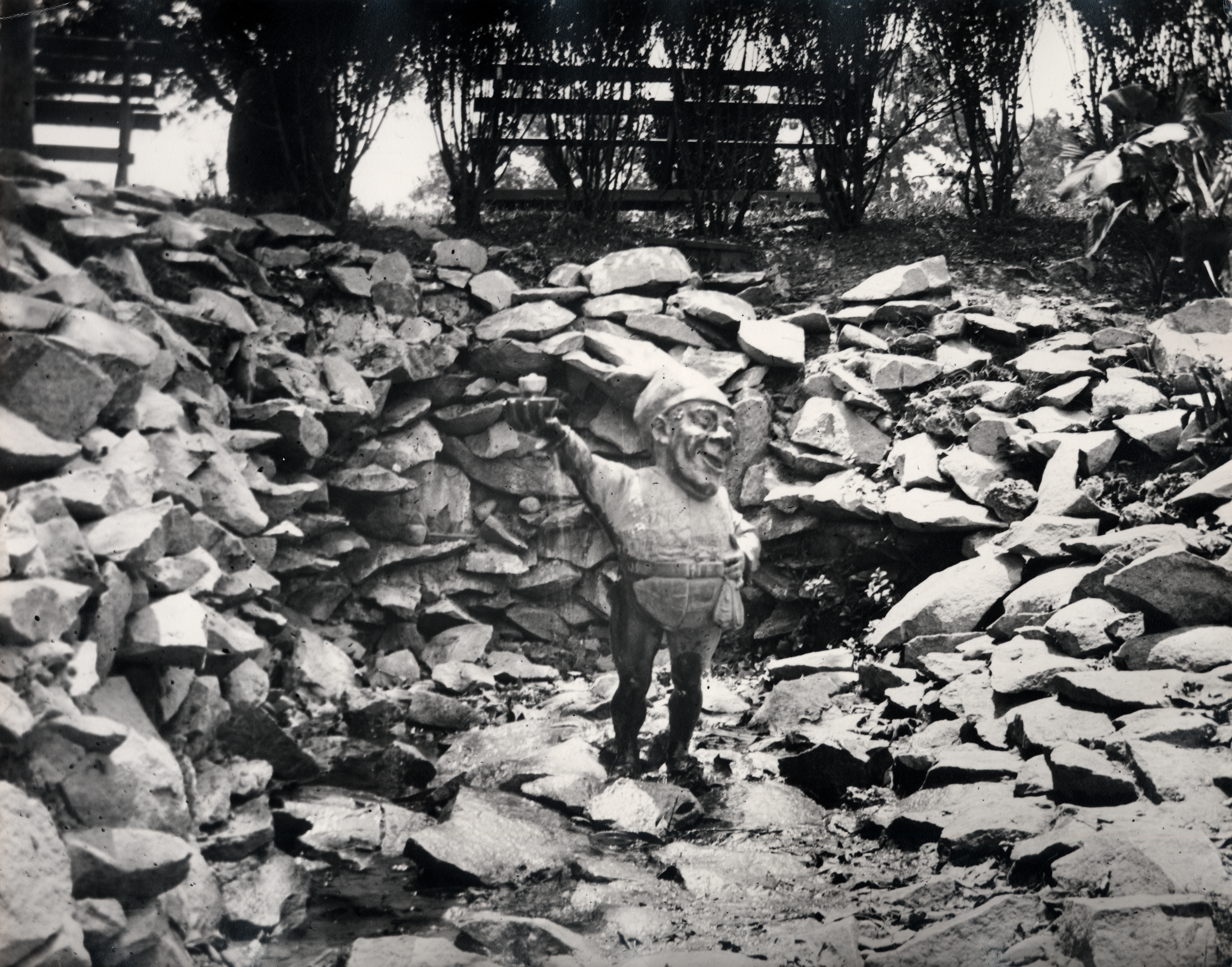
'Brownie' by Louis Amateis, photographed in 1907

== See also ==
- Scanlan Fountain

== Bibliography ==
- Bradley, Barrie Scardino (2020). Improbable Metropolis: Houston's Architectural and Urban History. Austin: University of Texas Press. ISBN 978-1-4773-2019-8.
- Culbertson, Margaret (1999). Texas Houses Built by the Book: The Use of Published Designs, 1850–1925. College Station, TX: Texas A&M University Press. ISBN 0-89096-863-2.
