= University of Houston College of Technology =

Coordinates: 29.72328°N 95.34265°W

University of Houston College of Technology.
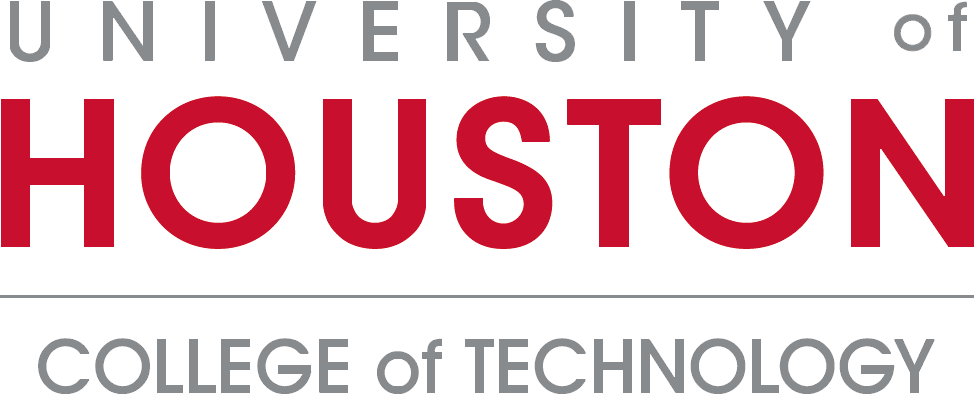
- Type: Public
- Established: 1941
- Dean: Anthony Ambler
- Students: 6,520
- Location: Houston and Sugar Land, Texas, United States
- Campus: Urban
- Affiliations: University of Houston
- Website: http://www.uh.edu/technology/

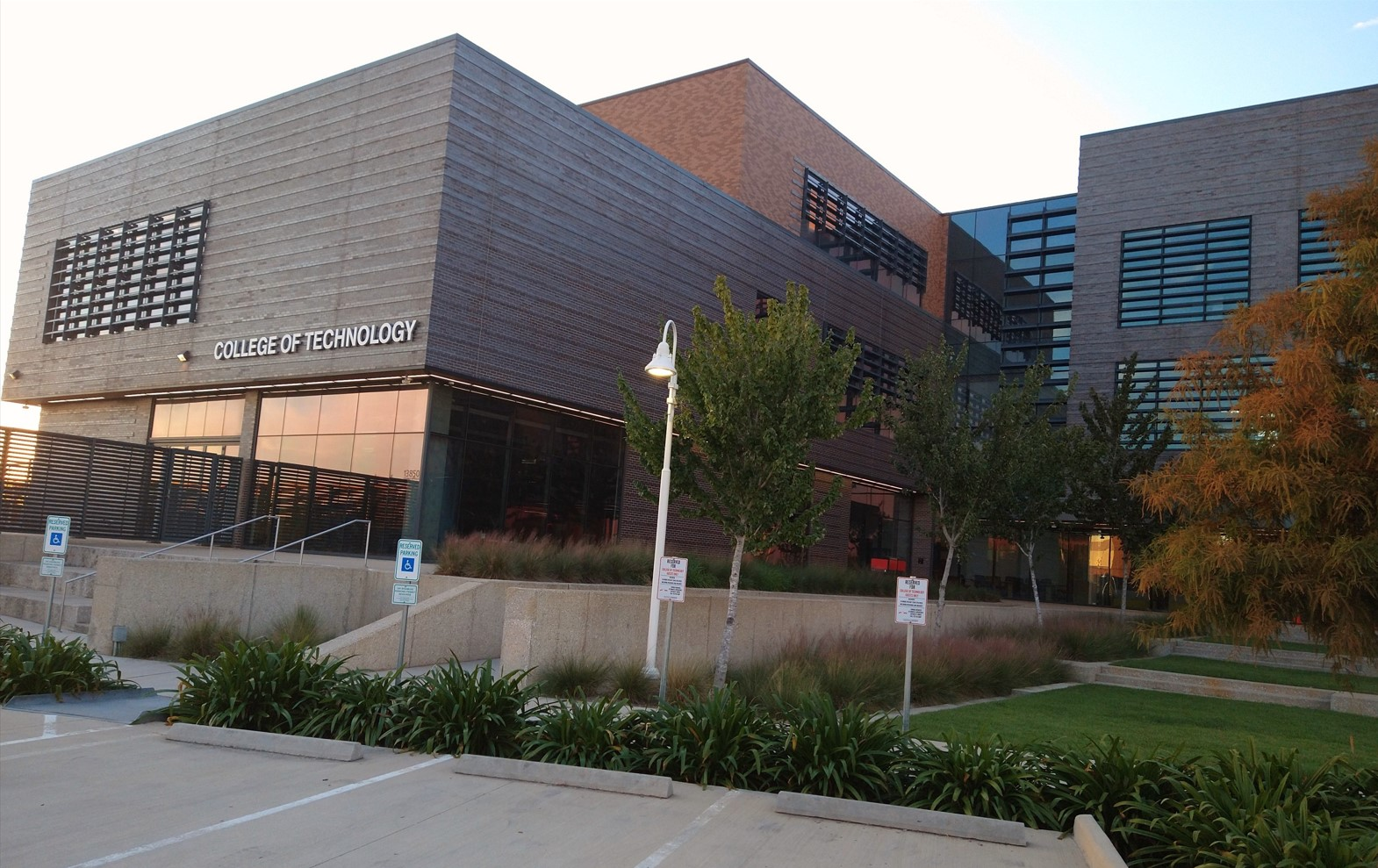
U of H College of Technology, Sugar Land

The University of Houston College of Technology is the second largest among 13 schools and colleges at the University of Houston. It offers 11 undergraduate degrees and 12 graduate degrees throughout four different departments. In fall of 2017, there were 6,520 students enrolled in the college. The University of Houston has a new building in Sugar Land, Texas, for the College of Technology; programs are being moved there and a couple of programs will solely be offered at that campus.

== History ==
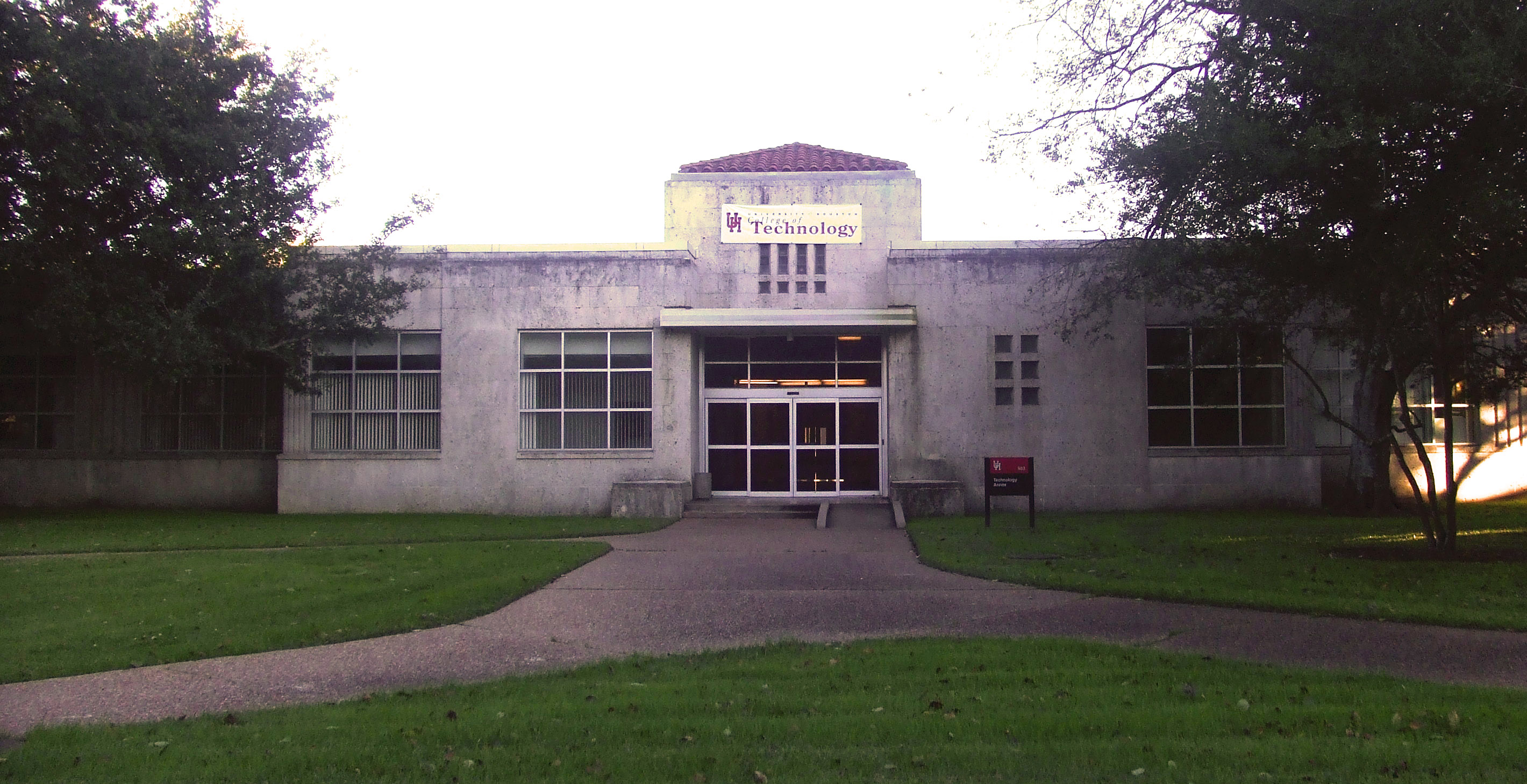
The College of Technology annex, one of the college's facilities

The College of Technology began in 1941 when local firms contributed funds for the third permanent building on campus for the new School of Technology. The first technical institute programs to be initiated by the new college in 1945 were also the first engineering technology programs in the state of Texas, accredited by the Engineers Council for Professional Development. By 1962, the College of Technology offered 16 programs-9 vocational and 7 engineering technology programs. By 1968, the college was granting a Bachelor of Science in Technology degree.

== Departments ==
The Construction Management department offers both an undergraduate and graduate degree in the field of Construction Management. The Engineering Technology department has carried forth the engineering technology programs that were the hallmark of the college's early years, and now covers the areas of biotechnology, computer engineering technology, electrical power engineering technology, and mechanical engineering technology. The Human Development and Consumer Sciences department covers the areas of retailing and consumer science, and human resources development, and the Information and Logistics Technology department covers information systems technology and security, digital media, supply chain and logistics technology, technology leadership and project management.

=== Houston Foresight Program ===
Within the Department of Human Development and Consumer Sciences is the University of Houston Foresight Program. The Houston Foresight Program is one of only 13 English speaking schools that offer a Master's degree in Foresight. It was established in 1974 at University of Houston–Clear Lake. In the early 1980s, Dr. Peter Bishop joined the faculty and became director of the program. By 2005, Dr. Andy Hines had joined the program and is the current director. In 2007, the program moved to the University of Houston main campus.

The program offers a Master of Science in Foresight and two types of certificates. The Master of Science in Foresight curriculum incorporates a blend of the essential theory, a framework and methods for doing the work, and a focus on application for clients in business, government, nonprofits, and society in general. The program teaches the Framework Foresight method to explore the future and perform foresight projects along with other approaches to futures work and explores the many different methods available to professional futurists. Graduates from this program typically find work in government, consulting, NGO's, and business.

== Research ==
=== Labs and Classrooms ===
The College of Technology has numerous classrooms and computer labs for training students in the latest technical advancements. In addition, each department has its own labs for teaching and research (Engineering Technology, Information and Logistics Technology and Human Development and Consumer Sciences).

Additional labs associated with the College of Technology with their own web sites include the following:

- The AT&T Technology Lab serves as a hub for the international educational and research community to facilitate the exchange of ideas and information.
- The Engineering Technology department has labs for the computer engineering and electrical power programs.
- The Instructional Support Services lab provides instructional support services for students and faculty.
- The Optical Networking Research Lab (ONRL) covers research in optical networking supported by AT&T and Sprint.
- The Intelligent Sensor Grid and Informatics Lab (ISGRIN) covers research in biomedical sensors and image processing, intelligent systems, distributed sensor networks, digital control systems and mechatronics.
