= Louis Amateis =

American sculptor

Louis Amateis, was an American sculptor born in Turin, Kingdom of Sardinia (now Italy) on December 13, 1855. He studied architecture at Istituto Italiano di Tecnologia and sculpture at the Royal Academy of Fine Art. He also studied in Milan and Paris before moving to New York City in 1884. While working as an architectural sculptor for McKim, Mead, and White he married his wife, Dora Ballin, in 1889. After getting married, the couple and their four sons moved to Washington, D.C. where he founded the School of Architecture and Fine Arts at what became George Washington University. He served as chairman from 1892 to 1902. He died March 18, 1913, of apoplexy. His son, Edmond, went on to be a prominent sculptor as well.

Amateis was a member of the National Sculpture Society.

== Works ==
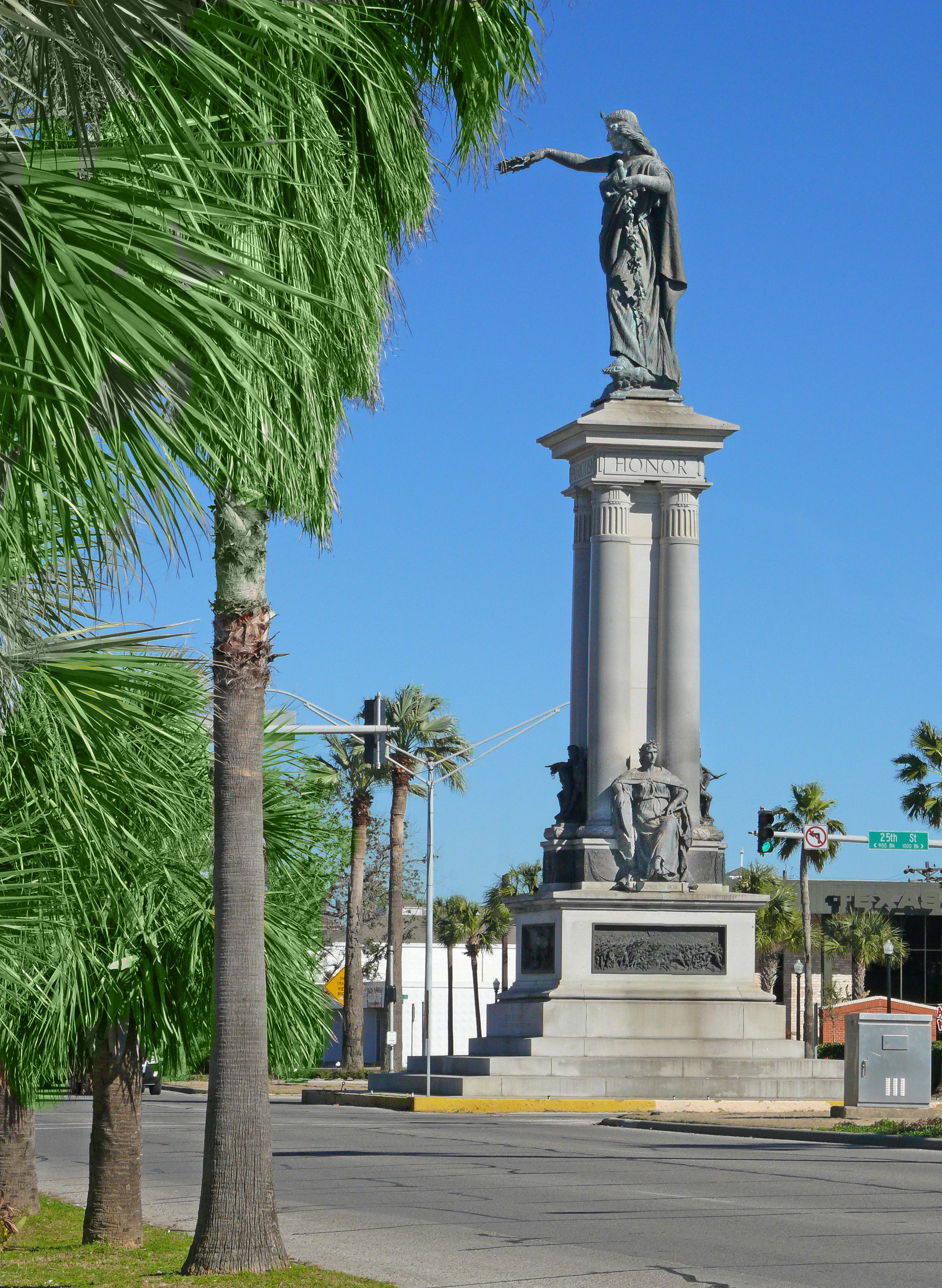
Texas Heroes Monument.

- Amateis has designed work for the United States Capitol and busts of Chester A. Arthur, General Winfield Scott Hancock, General John Logan, Andrew Carnegie among others.
- Amateis Doors, Capitol Building
- Heurich Mausoleum ca. 1895
- Brownie (1905)
- Texas Heroes Monument in Galveston, Texas
- Spirit of the Confederacy, Houston, Texas
- Call to Arms, Corsicana, Texas; ca. 1907-08
