= Texas Heroes Monument =

Memorial in Galveston, Texas, U.S.

- U.S. National Register of Historic Places
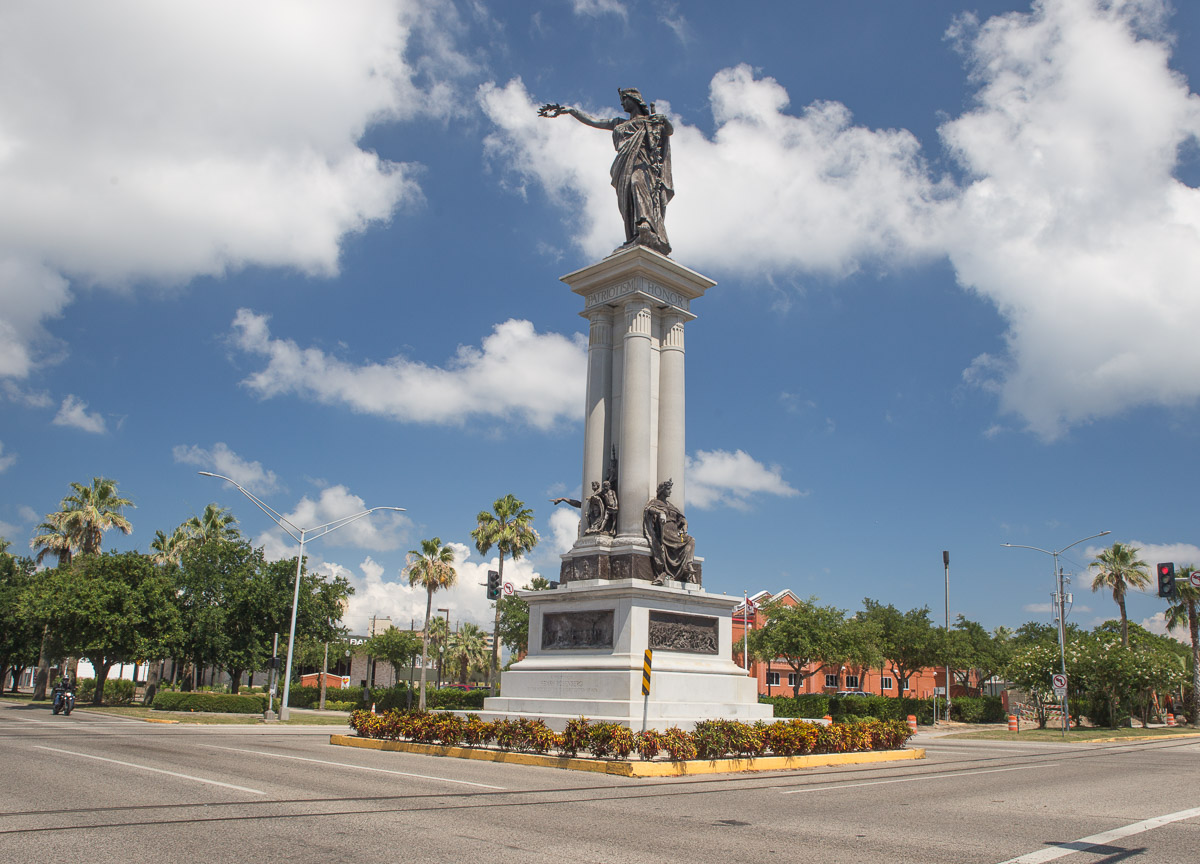
- Texas Heroes Monument in 2020

- Location within Texas Location within the United States
- Location: Broadway St. at 25th St. Galveston, Texas
- Coordinates: 29°17′58″N 94°47′40″W
- Area: less than one acre
- Built: 1900
- Sculptor: Louis Amateis
- Architectural style: Beaux-Arts
- MPS: Central Business District MRACentral Business District MRA
- NRHP reference No.: 84001737
- Added to NRHP: August 14, 1984

The Texas Heroes Monument is located in Galveston, Texas, and was commissioned by Henry Rosenberg to commemorate the brave people who fought during the Texas Revolution. The monument was built by New England Granite Works using Concord, New Hampshire, granite and bronze. The total cost was $50,000, and it was shipped before June 4, 1899. The sculptor of the monument was Louis Amateis. It is located at the intersection of Broadway and Rosenberg Avenue. It was unveiled on April 22, 1900.

== Henry Rosenberg ==
Henry Rosenberg, a well-known banker, bequeathed nearly a quarter of a million dollars to public enterprises, and among other items his will set aside $50,000 for the erection of a monument to commemorate the deeds of the heroes who participated in the struggle for Texas's independence. Rosenberg, Texas, is named after Henry Rosenberg, and he spent much of his money on other building projects like the Galveston Orphans Home and the Rosenberg Library.

== Louis Amateis ==
Amateis, who was a professor in Rome at the time, was required to submit his work on the statue groups, bas reliefs and other bronze works to the College of Sculptors at Rome for approval.

== Design ==
The monument is made mostly of light gray granite with a bronze statue and bronze reliefs. It is 74 feet (23 m) high including the statue of Victory. The base of the monument is 34 feet (10 m) in diameter. The bulk of the monument consists of four columns made from a single block of granite. These are 50 feet (15 m) high. At the top of the columns are words which represent the qualities of the men who fought for Texas: Patriotism, Honor, Devotion, Courage.

The statue of Victory is 22 feet (6.7 m) high. She holds a sheathed sword entwined with roses, and her right extended hand holds a crown of laurels.

=== Patriotism ===
This column faces north to overlook the entrance to Galveston and, at the time, the entrance to the state of Texas. At the base of the column is a bronze relief of Sam Houston flanked by representations of peace and war. Underneath Houston are the reliefs of five men: Henry Smith, Edward Burleson, Benjamin Milam, James Fannin and James Bonham. Below the column on the monument is a bas relief of the Battle of San Jacinto. And finally, below this, reads "A Tribute from Henry Rosenberg to the Heroes of the Texas Revolution of 1836."

=== Courage ===
This column faces east and contains the statue of a female unsheathing a sword and ordering the Mexicans out of Texas. She is known as Defiance, and underneath here is the date October 2, 1835, the day of the Goliad Massacre which is referenced by the bas relief of the massacre on the base of the monument.

=== Honor ===
Facing west, this column houses a bronze female figure who represents Peace. At her feet are the names of heroes who did not have photos that could be authenticated: Neill, Hockley, Karnes and de Zavalla. Below her is the date April 21, 1836, the Battle of San Jacinto. A bas relief underneath the date commemorates Santa Anna's surrender to Sam Houston after the Battle of San Jacinto.

=== Devotion ===
This column faces south and has a medallion of Stephen F. Austin surrounded by allegorical figures such as David Burnet, Davy Crockett, Frank Johnson, "Deaf" Smith and William Travis. Below is a bas relief commemorating the fall of the Alamo.

== Specific heroes commemorated ==
Bronze relief of Sam Houston flanked by representations of peace and war

- Stephen F. Austin
- James Bonham
- Edward Burleson
- David Burnett
- Davy Crockett
- James Fannin
- George Washington Hockley
- Sam Houston
- Henry Wax Karnes
- Frank White Johnson
- Benjamin Milam
- James Clinton Neill
- Erastus "Deaf" Smith
- Henry Smith
- William Barrett Travis
- Lorenzo de Zavala

== See also ==
- National Register of Historic Places listings in Galveston County, Texas
