= Eduard Harkort =

German engineer and colonel (1797–1836)

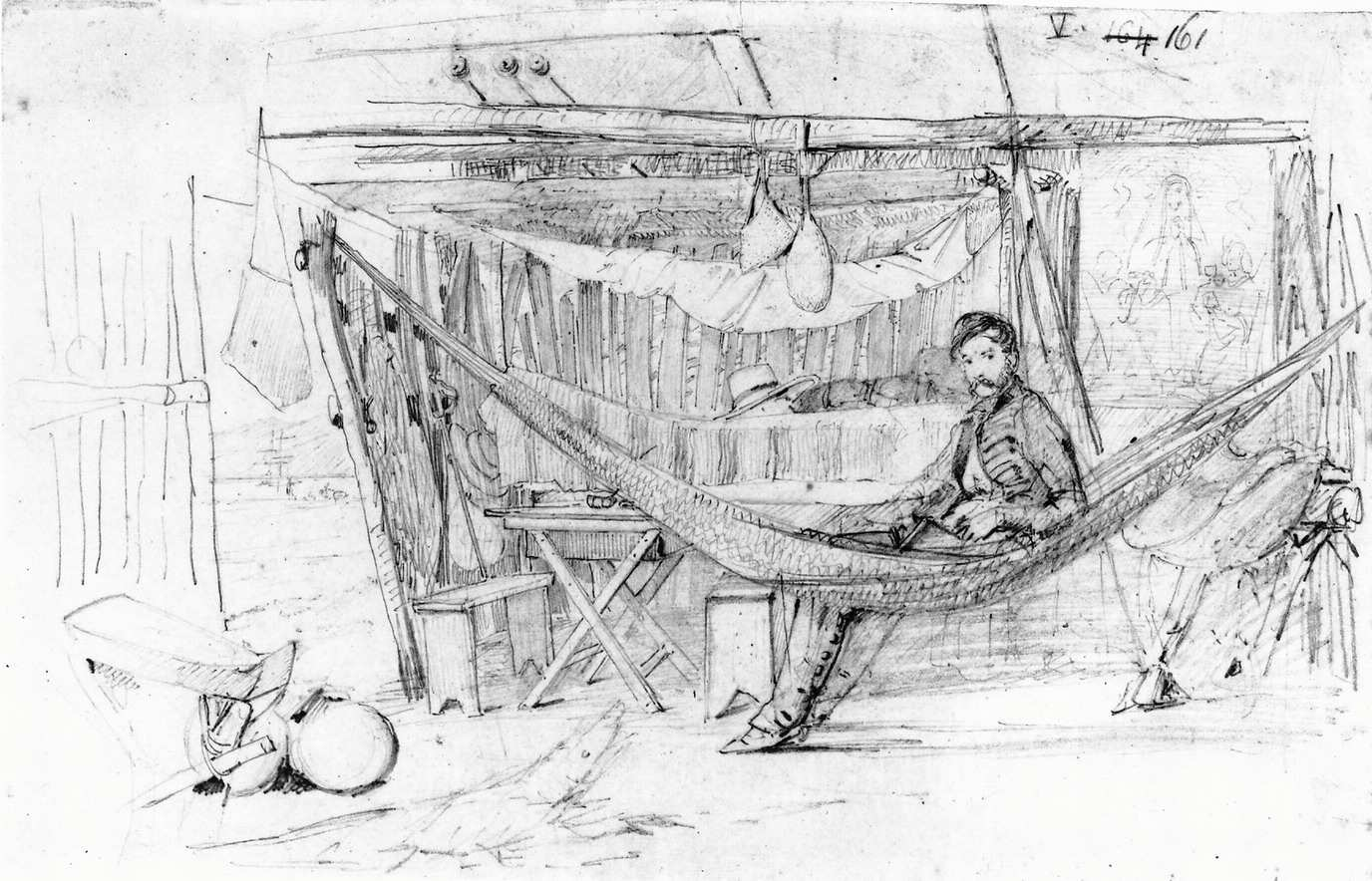
- Born: July 18, 1797; Hagen, Westphalia
- Died: August 11, 1836 (aged 39); Texas, U.S.
- Education: Freiberg University of Mining and Technology
- Parent(s): Johann Caspar Harkort IV; Henrietta Catharina Elbers

Eduard Harkort, also known as Edward Harcourt (July 18, 1797 – August 11, 1836) was a German-born mining engineer who served as a colonel in the Texian Army during the Texas Revolution.
