= Texas Humanitarian Service Ribbon =

- Type: Military award
- Awarded for: Service
- Description: The ribbon is red, white and blue striped
- Presented by: Texas Military Department
- Eligibility: Texas Military Forces
- Campaigns: Texas Military Conflicts
- Status: Currently issued
- Established: May 24, 1999
- Award device

Precedence
- Next (higher): Texas Desert Shield-Desert Storm Campaign Medal
- Next (lower): Texas Homeland Defense Service Medal

The Texas Humanitarian Service Ribbon is a campaign/service award of the Texas Military Department that may be issued to a service member of the Texas Military Forces. Subsequent awards are denoted by a bronze appurtenance starting with numeral 2.

== Eligibility ==
The Texas Humanitarian Service Ribbon shall be issued to any service member of the Texas Military Forces who:

- Served on active duty orders under Texas command (Title 32)
- Participated satisfactorily in the accomplishment of missions to protect life and/or property during or in the aftermath of natural disasters or civil unrest
- When the event does not meet the criteria for award of the United States Humanitarian Service Medal

== Authority ==
=== Issuing ===
The Adjutant General of Texas and a General Officer of Texas State Guard.

=== Legal ===
The Texas Humanitarian Service Ribbon was established by Senator Carlos Truan in Senate Bill 643, authorized by the Seventy-sixth Texas Legislature, and approved by Governor George W. Bush on May 24, 1999, effective same date. Texas Government Code, Chapter 437 (Texas Military), Subchapter H. (Awards), Section 355 (Other Awards), Line 5.

== Description ==
=== Ribbon ===
The ribbon is 1-3/8 inches wide and consists of the following stripes: 3/16 inch red; 1/8 inch blue; 1/8 inch white, 11/16 inch blue, 1/8 inch white, 1/8 inch blue and 3/16 inch red.

=== Device ===
Subsequent awards are denoted by a bronze appurtenance starting with numeral 2.

== Notable Recipients ==
Date	Service Member	Citation	Reference

== See also ==
- Awards and decorations of the Texas Military
- Awards and decorations of the Texas government
- Texas Military Forces
- Texas Military Department
- List of conflicts involving the Texas Military
