= Texas Homeland Defense Service Medal =

- Type: Military award
- Awarded for: Service
- Description: The ribbon drape is of emerald green, goldenrod, and azure blue stripes. The medal is a white star within a circle of gold. On the gold circle are the words "Texas Homeland Defense Service Medal" and on the star is the image of the Lexington Minuteman Captain John Parker.
- Presented by: Texas Military Department
- Eligibility: Texas Military Forces
- Campaigns: Texas Military Conflicts
- Status: Currently issued
- Established: June 15, 2007
- Texas Homeland Defense Service Medal medal ribbon

Precedence
- Next (higher): Texas Humanitarian Service Ribbon
- Next (lower): Texas Border Security and Support Service Ribbon

The Texas Homeland Defense Service Medal is a campaign/service award of the Texas Military Department that may be issued to service members of the Texas Military Forces. Subsequent awards are issued by a bronze or silver cactus leaf.

== Eligibility ==
The Texas Homeland Defense Service Medal is a one-time award to any member of the Texas Military Forces who:

- After 11 September 2001
- Served on active duty orders under Texas command (Title 32) or under civilian authority
- Satisfactorily in a mission for defense of Texas

== Authority ==
=== Issuing ===
The Adjutant General of Texas.

=== Legal ===
The Texas Homeland Defense Service Medal was established by Representative Dan Flynn in House Bill Number 2897, authorized by the Eightieth Texas Legislature, and approved by Governor Rick Perry on 15 June 2007, effective the same date.

== See also ==
- Awards and decorations of the Texas Military
- Awards and decorations of the Texas government
- Texas Military Forces
- Texas Military Department
- List of conflicts involving the Texas Military
