= Texas State Guard Commendation Medal =

Military award

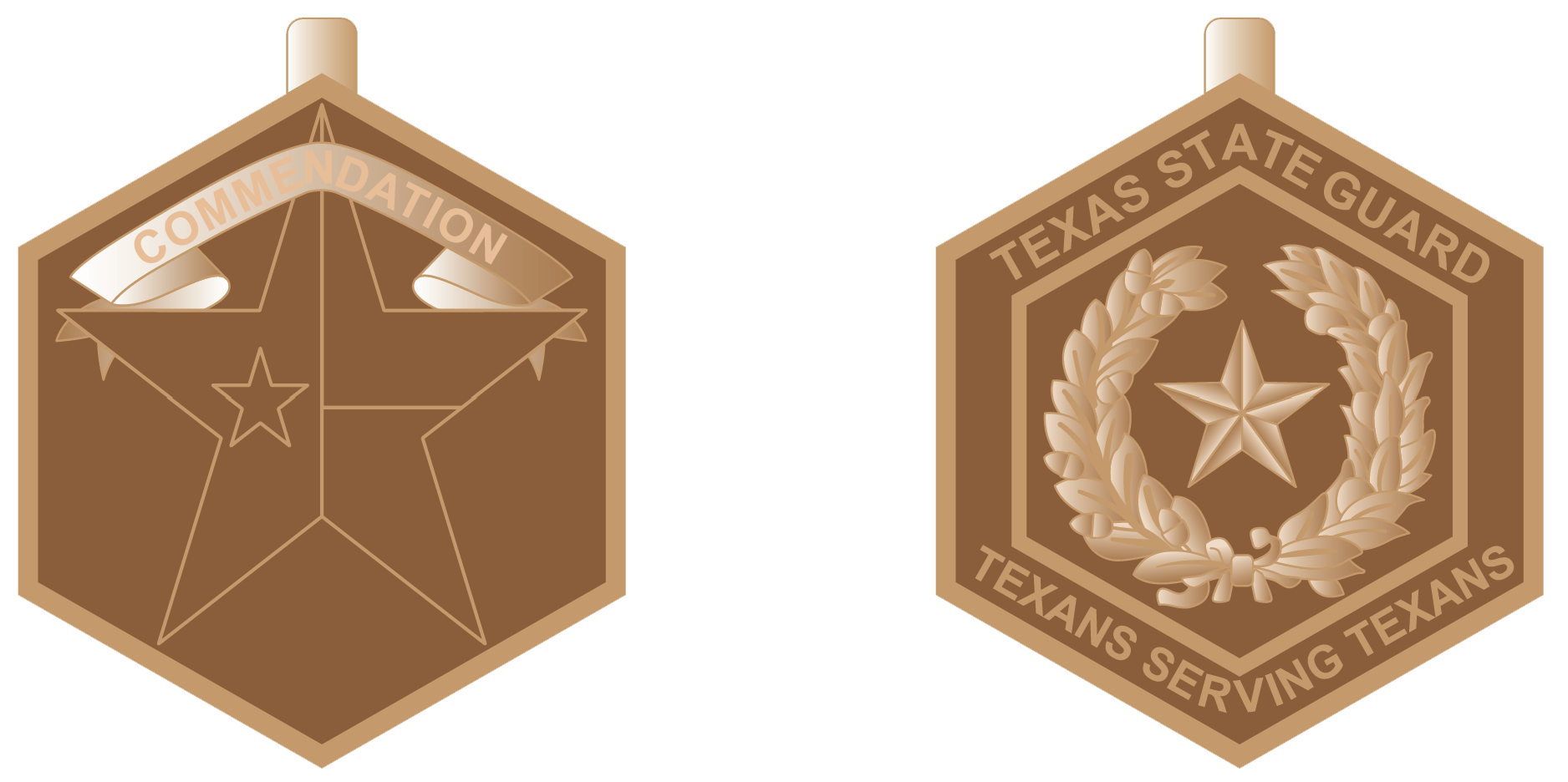
- Type: Military decoration
- Awarded for: Commendable service or achievement
- Presented by: Texas State Guard
- Status: Currently issued
- Established: May 12, 2021
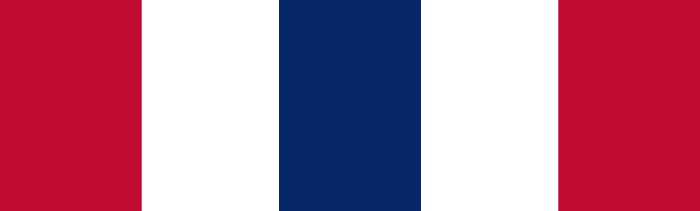
- Service Ribbon

Precedence
- Next (higher): Texas State Guard Meritorious Service Medal
- Next (lower): Texas State Guard Achievement Medal

The Texas State Guard Commendation Medal is the tenth highest military decoration that may be conferred to a service member of the Texas State Guard.

== Eligibility ==
The Texas State Guard Commendation Medal is awarded to acknowledge a service member for a specific service, accomplishment, or for the performance of a courageous, but non-life-threatening act that brings distinction to their unit.

== Description ==
The medal pendant is of bronze, hexagonal in shape with one point facing upwards, 1 1/4 inches from top point to bottom point, and 1 1/10 inches wide. On the obverse side of the pendant is a five-pointed raised star, one point up, 1 inch in diameter, encasing the design of the flag of Texas. Over the top triangle of the five-pointed star is a banner that reads, "COMMENDATION". On the reverse side of the pendant is a five-pointed raised star, one point up, 5/16 of an inch in diameter surrounded by a wreath formed by an olive branch on the right and a live oak branch on the left, surrounded by the words "TEXAS STATE GUARD" along the upper point and "TEXANS SERVING TEXANS" along the lower point, in raised letters.

== Ribbon ==
The pendant is suspended by a ring from a rayon moiré ribbon 1 3/8 inches long 1 3/8 inches and wide, composed of five vertical stripes of Old Glory Red #67156 (5/16 inch), White #67101 (1/4 inch), Old Glory Blue #67178 (1/4 inch), White (1/4 inch), and Old Glory Red (5/16 inch).

== Devices ==
A bronze oak leaf cluster award device is conferred for second and succeeding decorations. A silver leaf cluster is worn in lieu of five bronze leaves. Silver leaves are worn to the wearer's right of a bronze leaf.

== See also ==
- Awards and decorations of the Texas Military
- Awards and decorations of the Texas government
- Texas Military Forces
- Texas Military Department
