= Texas State Guard Service Medal =

Military award in Texas, United States

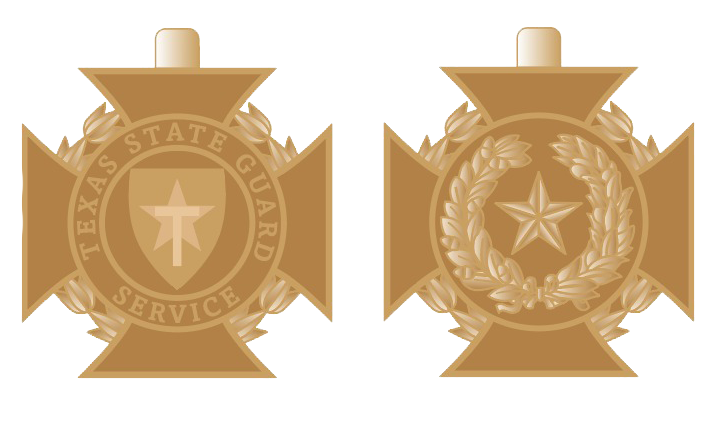
- Type: Military award
- Awarded for: Service
- Description: The drape is a moiré ribbon of yellow, blue, white and red stripes that are each 3/32 inch (2.4 mm) wide. The medal is a bronze cross pattée with the coat of arms of the Texas State Guard and the words "Texas State Guard" and "Service" on the obverse. The reverse contains the Coat of Arms of Texas.
- Presented by: Texas Military Department
- Eligibility: Texas Military Forces
- Status: Currently issued
- Established: December 1, 1943
- Texas State Guard Service Medal medal ribbon

Precedence
- Next (higher): Texas Faithful Service Medal
- Next (lower): Officer Professional Development Ribbon

The Texas State Guard Service Medal is a campaign or service award of the Texas Military Department that may be issued to a service member of the Texas Military Forces. There is no provision for subsequent awards.

Issuance of the Texas State Guard Service Medal requires authorization by the Texas State Guard Commanding General and presentation to the awardee by the next higher level of command.

Although the Texas Military Department awards regulation states that the medal is in the shape of a maltese cross, the medal has always been manufactured using a cross pattée pattern. The same regulation specifies that the drape must be made of a yellow moiré ribbon with blue, white and red stripes that are each 3/32 inch (2.4 mm) wide, but in 2022 the Texas State Guard Headquarters began issuing medals that disregard these requirements as a cost-saving measure. Medals that meet the regulations must be obtained commercially.

== See also ==
- Awards and decorations of the Texas Military
- Awards and decorations of the Texas government
- Texas Military Forces
- Texas Military Department
- List of conflicts involving the Texas Military
