= Texas State Guard Meritorious Service Medal =

Military decoration

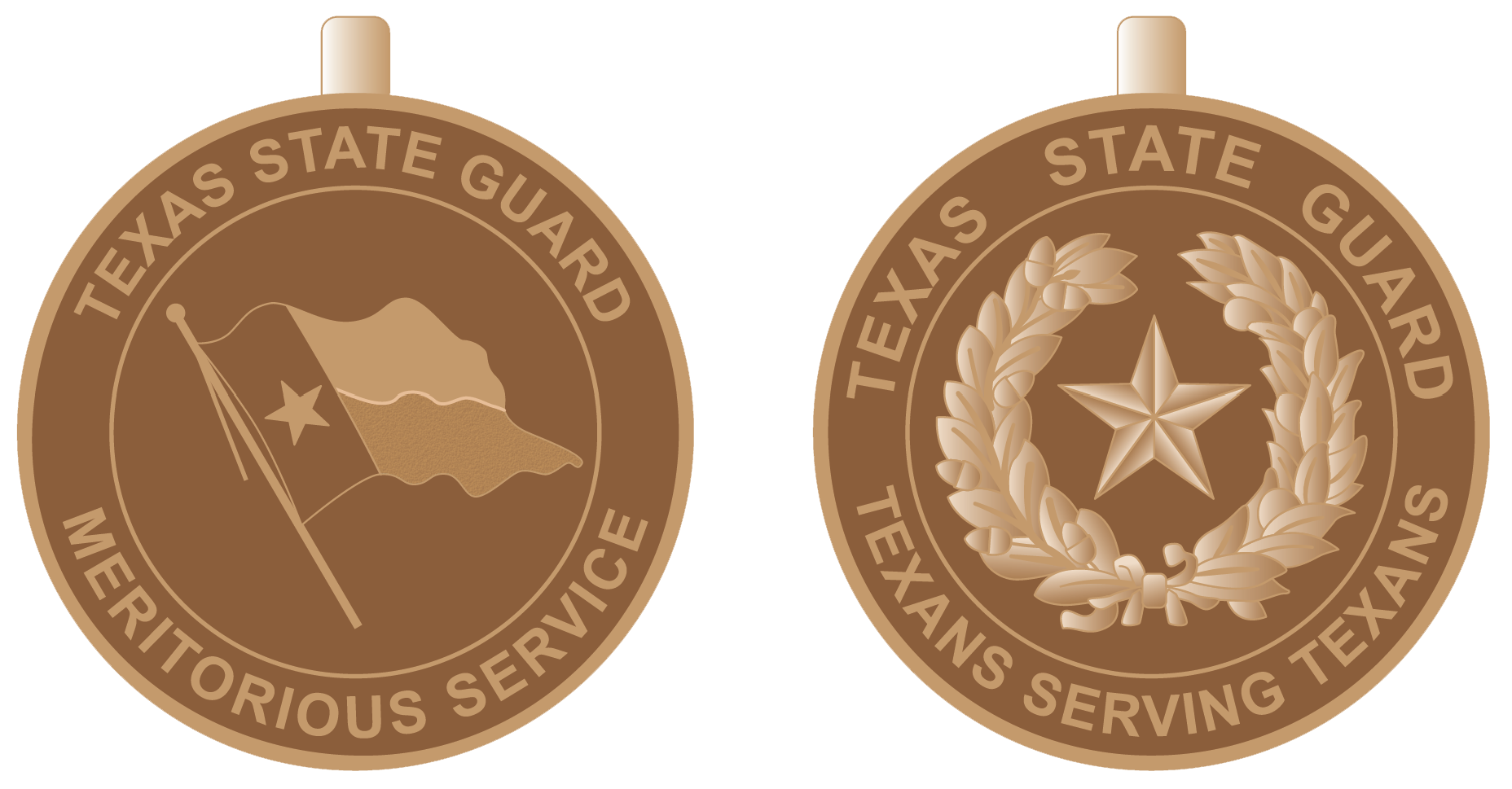
- Type: Military decoration
- Awarded for: Exceptional service or achievement
- Presented by: Texas Military Department
- Eligibility: Texas State Guard
- Status: Currently issued
- Established: May 12, 2021
- Service Ribbon

Precedence
- Next (higher): Texas State Guard Exemplary Service Medal
- Next (lower): Texas State Guard Commendation Medal

The Texas State Guard Meritorious Service Medal is the ninth-highest military decoration that may be conferred to a service member of the Texas Military Forces. Subsequent decorations are denoted by a bronze or silver twig of four oak leaves with three acorns on the stem device.

== Eligibility ==
The Texas State Guard Meritorious Service Medal is conferred to any service member of the Texas State Guard who, while serving in any capacity, shall distinguish themselves by meritorious service or achievement, but of a lesser degree than required for a higher decoration. The service or achievement shall be such that it clearly sets them above their peers and above what is to be normally expected.

== Authority ==
TXSG Regulation 1000.01 dated 12 May 2021 upgraded the award from a ribbon to a medal.

== Description ==
The medal pendant is of bronze, 1 1/4 inches in diameter. On the obverse side of the pendant is a waiving Texas flag on a flagpole tilted -45 degrees, encircled by the words, "TEXAS STATE GUARD" on the upper arc and "MERITORIOUS SERVICE" along the lower arc. On the reverse side of the pendant is a five-pointed raised star, one point up, 3/8 of an inch in diameter surrounded by a wreath formed by an olive branch on the right and a live oak branch on the left, surrounded by the words "TEXAS STATE GUARD" along the upper arc and "TEXANS SERVING TEXANS" along the lower arc, in raised letters.

== Ribbon ==
The pendant is suspended by a ring from a rayon moiré ribbon 1 3/8 inches long 1 3/8 inches and wide, composed of eleven vertical stripes of Orange #67110 (11/64 of an inch), Green #67129 (17/64 of an inch) Old Glory Red #67156 (1/16 of an inch), Ultramarine Blue #67118 (1/16 of an inch), Old Glory Red (1/16 of an inch), Old Gold # 67105 (1/8 of an inch), Old Glory Red (1/16 of an inch), Ultramarine Blue (1/16 of an inch), Old Glory Red (1/16 of an inch), Green (17/64 of an inch), and Orange (11/64 of an inch).

== Device ==
A bronze oak leaf cluster award device, is conferred for second and succeeding decorations. A silver leaf cluster is worn in lieu of five bronze leaves. Silver leaves are worn to the wearer's right of a bronze leaf.

== See also ==
- Awards and decorations of the Texas Military
- Awards and decorations of the Texas government
- Texas Military Forces
- Texas Military Department
- List of conflicts involving the Texas Military
