= Awards and decorations of the Texas Military =

The Texas Medal of Honor is the highest decoration of the Texas Military

Awards and decorations of the Texas Military are medals, ribbons, badges, tabs, trophies, plaques, certificates, memorials, monuments, holidays, and general honors that recognize service and achievement in the Texas Military Forces.

== Regulation ==
The Texas Military Department medal and ribbon awards are governed by the Texas Government Code (Chapter 437, Subchapter H) and Joint Force Texas Regulation (1-07). Because Texas Military Forces existence is authorized under Title 32 of the United States Code, wear and precedence of medals and ribbons on the service uniform and duty uniform is governed by the United States Department of the Army Pamphlet regulation 670-1.

Because Texas National Guard service members are also subject to Title 10 of the United States Code, they are also authorized to wear and eligible to earn awards, decorations, and badges of the United States National Guard and United States Armed Forces.

Texas State Guard service members who previously earned awards, decorations, and badges of the United States National Guard and United States Armed Forces are authorized to wear them.

== Order of precedence ==
Because Texas Military Forces existence is authorized under Title 32 of the United States Code, precedence of medals and ribbons on the service uniform and duty uniform is governed by the Department of Defense Instruction 1348.33 and United States Department of the Army Pamphlet regulation 670-1.

Like the United States Armed Forces, Texas Military medals and ribbons are distinctly categorized by general service and achievement awards, and distinguished service and achievement decorations, which is reflected in the order of precedence.

General order of precedence:

1. United States Armed Forces personal decorations
2. United States Armed Forces unit awards
3. United States Non-Military (personal) Decorations, to include certain Military Society Decorations and Medals, as outlined in DOD Instr. 1348.33 section 11 (c)(2019), and as defined by 10USC§ 1123, Right to Wear Badges of Military Societies, but only those to wit: 'a society originally composed of men who served in an armed force of the United States during the Revolutionary War, the War of 1812, the Mexican War, the Civil War, the Spanish–American War, the Philippine–American War, or the Chinese Relief Expedition of 1900' (e.g., Society of the Cincinnati, Military Order of Foreign Wars, Veterans of Foreign Wars, Army and Navy Union, Sons of the American Revolution), as well as US Government Agency personal decorations(e.g., DOD civilian medals, Homeland Security, NASA, etc.) (DODI1348.33Sec11c).
4. United States civilian unit awards
5. United States Armed Forces campaign and service medals
6. United States Armed Forces service and training awards
7. United States Merchant Marine awards and non-military service awards
8. Foreign military personal decorations
9. Foreign military unit awards
10. International service awards
11. Foreign military service awards
12. United States Armed Forces marksmanship awards
13. United States organization awards, and badges of military societies not included in/defined by 10USC1123 and/or formed after that statute, predominantly in the 20th century and later (after 1907) (e.g., American Legion).
14. United States National Guard personal decorations
15. United States National Guard unit awards
16. United States National Guard campaign and service medals
17. United States National Guard service and training awards
18. Texas Military decorations
19. Texas Military unit awards
20. Texas Military campaign and service awards
21. Texas Military service and training awards

== Department level awards ==
=== Medals and ribbons ===
Because Texas National Guard service members are also subject to Title 10 of the United States Code, they are also authorized to wear, and eligible to earn, medals and ribbons of the United States National Guard and United States Armed Forces. Texas State Guard service members who previously earned medals and ribbons of the United States National Guard and United States Armed Forces are authorized to wear them.

The following is a list of medals and ribbons from the Texas Military. They are distinctly categorized by distinguished service and achievement decorations, and general service and achievement awards, which is reflected by the order of precedence. It is generally stated that decorations are conferred and awards are issued.

Decorations
Texas Medal of Honor
Texas Medal of Valor
Texas Purple Heart
Texas Superior Service Medal
Texas Distinguished Service Medal
Texas Outstanding Service Medal
Texas Medal of Merit
Texas Adjutant General's Individual Award
Texas State Guard Exemplary Service Medal
Texas State Guard Meritorious Service Ribbon
Texas State Guard Commendation Medal
Texas State Guard Achievement Medal
Texas State Guard Commanding General's Individual Award
Texas State Guard Good Conduct Medal
Texas State Guard Recruiting Ribbon
Decoration Appurtenances
Gold Oak Leaf Device
Silver Oak Leaf Device
Enameled Star Device
Bronze Oak Leaf Device
Bronze Valor Device
Silver Acorn Device
Bronze Acorn Device
Campaign and Service Awards
Texas Federal Service Medal
Texas Afghanistan Campaign Medal
Texas Iraqi Campaign Medal
Texas Desert Shield/Desert Storm Campaign Medal
Texas Humanitarian Service Ribbon
Texas Homeland Defense Service Medal
Texas Border Security and Support Service Ribbon
Texas Combat Service Ribbon
Texas Cavalry Service Medal
Texas Cold War Medal
Texas Faithful Service Medal
Texas State Guard Service Medal
Service and Training Awards
Texas State Guard Officer Professional Development Ribbon
Texas State Guard NCO Professional Development Ribbon
Texas State Guard Training Ribbon
Texas State Guard Physical Fitness Ribbon
Unit Awards
Texas Governor's Unit Citation
Texas Meritorious Unit Award
Organizational Excellence Award
Award Appurtenances
Silver Star Device
Bronze Star Device
Bronze Cactus Leaf Device
Bronze Numerals

=== Badges ===
Because Texas National Guard service members are also subject to Title 10 of the United States Code, they are also authorized to wear, and eligible to earn, Military badges of the United States. Texas State Guard service members who previously earned Military badges of the United States are authorized to wear them.

The following is a list of badges from the Texas Military:

==== Special Skills Badges ====
3rd Class Diver Badge TMD-TXSG MOS 1374-20
Dive Medic Badge TMD-TXSG MOS 1374-DMTI
2nd Class Diver Badge TMD-TXSG MOS 1374-30
1st Class Diver Badge TMD-TXSG MOS 1374-40
Master Diver Badge TMD-TXSG MOS 1374-50
Dive Officer Badge TMD-TXSG MOS 1374-5V
Crewman Boat Operator Badge TMD-TXSG MOS 21-B-20
Coxswain Boat Operator Badge TMD-TXSG MOS 21-B-30
Master Boat Operator Badge TMD-TXSG MOS 21-B-40
Basic Military Emergency Management Specialist Badge
Expert Medical Badge
Engineer Officer Badge
Engineer Specialist Badge
Operation Deployment Badge Flash

==== Identification Badges ====
Texas Military Forces Joint Staff Badge	The badge is an oval enameled metal device, 2 inches wide, 2-3/16 inches tall. The badge consists of cross sabers in gold with the inscription “TXMF” above the State of Texas Flag which is centered and “Joint Staff” below the Texas Flag surrounded by a silver wreath.
Texas Army National Guard General Staff Badge	The badge is a circular enameled metal device, 1-7/8 inches in diameter. The badge consists of the Joint Force Headquarters distinctive unit insignia superimposed on a five-pointed gold-edged black star, one point up, on a background of green, gold-trimmed laurel leaves.
Texas State Guard General's Staff Badge	
Recruiter Badge	

==== Tabs ====
Governor's Twenty Tab
Honor Guard Tab
MEMS Academy Tab

=== Certificates ===
- The Texas Adjutant General's Certificate of Commendation
  - Awarded for outstanding achievement or performance of duty when such action or duty is noteworthy. It may be presented to any service member of the Texas Military Forces, or to any employee (civilian or military) of the Texas Military Department. It may also be awarded to a unit/detachment of the Texas Military Forces for outstanding administrative or training achievement performance. The certificate will not be awarded for any acts or performance covered by another award, except that awards in conjunction with retirement may cover the entire period(s) of service in the Texas Military Forces or with the Texas Military Department, regardless of any other awards.
- The Texas Adjutant General's Certificate of Appreciation
  - Awarded to any individual, organization, or entity (military or civilian), not a member or part of the Texas National Guard or Texas State Guard, for significant aid, assistance, or support to any part or all of the Texas Military Forces.

=== Hall of Honor ===
The Hall of Honor was established by the Texas Military Department in 1980 to "recognize outstanding service and leadership" of Texas Military Forces service members operating under state or federal command. As of 2018, it has 120 inductees.

It is hosted by the Texas Military Forces Museum at Camp Mabry. It is both an exhibit with a digital kiosk that showcases inductee biographies, and an eponymous conference center that may be rented for conventions or banquets. Inductees also receive a trophy, which has varied in type since 1980.

=== Hall of Fame ===
The Texas Ranger Hall of Fame was established in 1964 to recognize service members who "significantly contributed to the development of the service or died heroically in the line of duty." As of 2019, it has 31 inductees — 24 of which served under the Texas Military Department. The Texas Rangers were a branch of the Texas Military Forces from 1835 to 1935, providing cavalry, special operations, and military police capabilities. Administrative control (ADCON) of the Texas Rangers was transferred from the Texas Military Department to the Texas Department of Public Safety (DPS) in 1935. Under DPS, the Texas Rangers perform duties similar to the Federal Bureau of Investigation (FBI) for Texas as a State Bureau of Investigation (SBI).

=== Texas State Cemetery ===
The Texas State Cemetery was established by the Fifth Texas Legislature in 1854 as the burial site for General Edward Burleson in Austin. It is considered the "Arlington of Texas." It was extensively expanded after the American Civil War for the burial of 2,000 officers and their wives. It has expanded over the ensuing years for the burial of "prominent" Texans. It is operated by the Texas State Preservation Board but remains predominately occupied by Texas military service members.

=== Funeral Honors and Markers ===
By request of a descendant or estate executor, the Texas Military Department provides any service member of the Texas Military Forces a military funeral and grave marker modeled on the ceremony and style provided to service members of the United States Armed Forces. Exact details are outlined in Texas Government Code 437.215. It was established via Texas Senate Bill 1536 sponsored by Senator Leticia Van de Putte on 01 September 2013.

=== Holidays ===
==== Texas Military Heroes Week ====
Texas Military Heroes Week is an annual memorial holiday from February 5-11th that encourages "all Texans to recognize and honor those who have secured our freedom throughout the generations and those who are defending it still...During the first full week of February, we honor all who have sacrificed and served on behalf of the Lone Star State. No matter the battle, no matter the branch, no matter the job – they deserve our gratitude and reverence." It was established via Executive Proclamation by Commander-in-Chief Greg Abbott on 28 January 2023, which replaces Texas Military Heroes Day (aka "Chris Kyle Day") established on 2 February 2016.

==== Women Veterans Month ====
Women Veterans Month was established by Greg Abbott on March 1, 2023. It dedicates the month of March to "celebrate the women who have served our nation and to rededicate ourselves to the timeless ideals for which they valiantly fought."

==== Special Forces Day ====
Special Forces Day is an annual memorial holiday on June 28 that "honors the men and women who have served in the special operations forces..to be regularly observed by appropriate ceremonies." It was established on May 16, 2023, during the Eighty-eighth Texas Legislature in House Bill 2499 sponsored by Cecil Bell and Brandon Creighton.

=== Other awards ===
- Texas Meritorious Service Award – presented to civilians, organizations, or non-Texas service members for exceptional service and support to the Texas Military Forces.
- President's Volunteer Service Award – Service (volunteered hours) in the Texas Military Forces are eligible for the President's Volunteer Service Award, a Bronze, Silver, Gold, and Lifetime necklet award.

== Branch level awards ==
=== Gonzales Cup ===
The Gonzales Cup is the top award of the Commander's Small Unit Excellence Challenge, an annual, two-day team and individual competition that tests core skills and physical endurance of Texas State Guard service members. It was established in 2013 and its namesake is the Battle of Gonzales.

=== 300 Club ===
The 300 Club is an unofficial award colloquially referred to by service members who achieve the maximum score of 300 points in the Army Physical Fitness Test. While it is universally recognized among the Texas Army National Guard, Texas Air National Guard, and Texas State Guard, there is no official list that documents its members. It is generally an esprit de corps tradition at the unit level.

== Unit level awards ==
Unit level awards that may be worn on a service or duty uniform are authorized as a military tradition in United States Department of the Army Pamphlet regulation 670-1 at the discretion of the commanding officer.

=== Officer Candidate School (TXSG) ===
==== Honor Graduate ====
The Honor Graduate award, officially the BG Thomas C. Hamilton Distinguished Honor Graduate and formerly the MG Raymond C. Peters Distinguished Honor Graduate, is the top award of the Texas State Guard Officer Candidate School (OCS). It is awarded to graduates of the Officer Candidate Course (OCC) based on their combined Leadership, Academic, Physical Fitness, and Peer Evaluation performance.

The award was established in 2003 by COL Mervyn J. Doherty when he established Officer Candidate School. Its first given namesake was the commanding general of the Texas State Guard, MG Raymond C. Peters, in 2009. It was renamed after BG Thomas C. Hamilton in 2014, who redesigned the school in 2010.

==== Crucible MVP ====
The Crucible MVP award, officially the Final Field Training Exercise Most Valuable Player Award, is the second highest award of the Texas State Guard Officer Candidate School (OCS). It is awarded to candidates of the Officer Candidate Course (OCC) final field training exercise based on their combined Leadership, Academic, and Physical Fitness performance during the exercise.

The award was established in 2014 by CPT H. Lee Burton and its namesake is week 10 of United States Marine Corps Recruit Training, for which the exercise mirrors.

==== Other awards ====
- OCC Leadership Award
- OCC Academic Award
- OCC Physical Training Award
- OCC Crucible Team Award

=== Command and General Staff College (TXSG) ===
==== Honor Graduate ====
The Honor Graduate award, officially the COL Stephen B. Springer Academic Excellence Award is the top award of the Texas State Guard Command and General Staff College. It is awarded to graduates based on their academic performance.

The award was established in 2014 by COL Stephen B. Springer when he established the Commander and General Staff College. It was given his namesake in 2015.

== Inactive and obsolete awards ==
Texas Military Department Awards:

- Adjutant’s General’s Staff Identification Badge was replaced by the Texas Military Forces Joint Staff Badge on 01 August 2009.
- Texas National Guard:
  - Texas National Guard Medal of Merit
  - Texas National Guard Mexican War Service Medal
  - Texas National Guard Outstanding Service Medal
  - Texas National Guard Provost Marshal Section Ribbon
  - Texas National Guard State Guard Civil Defense Ribbon
- Texas State Guard:
  - Special Operations Tab (for Quick Response Teams, 2009–2014)
  - Small Arms Marksmanship Ribbon
  - Marksmanship Qualification Badge
  - Occupational Badges:
    - (a) Command and Control (b) Law Enforcement/Security Forces (c) Enlisted Medical (d) Medical Corps (e) Medical Services/Biomedical Sciences (f) Nurse (g) Material Acquisition (h) Chaplain (all denominations) (i) Chaplain Services (j) Communications/Computer Systems (k) Information Management (l) Judge Advocate (m) Logistics (n) Personnel and Manpower Management (o) Operations Support (p) Public Affairs (q) Paralegal (r) Services (s) Supply
  - Spur Walk, also known as Operation Heavy METL, is a 24hr, 18-mile team competition that consists of land navigation, leadership reaction tasks, obstacle course, and mission skills. Service members who earn enough points are awarded silver spurs. It was established in 2008 and its namesake is the Order of the Spur, for which the competition mirrors. It was discontinued in 2019.

== See also ==
- Texas Military Forces
- Texas Military Department
- List of conflicts involving the Texas Military
- Awards and decorations of the Texas government
- Awards and decorations of the United States Armed Forces
