= Texas Combat Service Ribbon =

- Type: Military award
- Awarded for: Service
- Description: The ribbon is red, white and blue striped
- Presented by: Texas Military Department
- Eligibility: Texas Military Forces
- Campaigns: Texas Military Conflicts
- Status: Currently issued
- Established: June 17, 2005
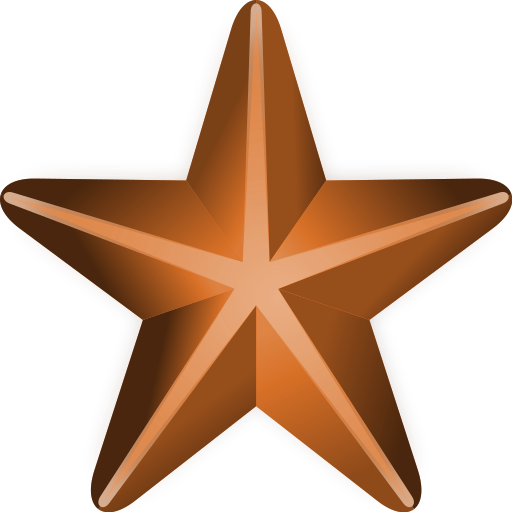
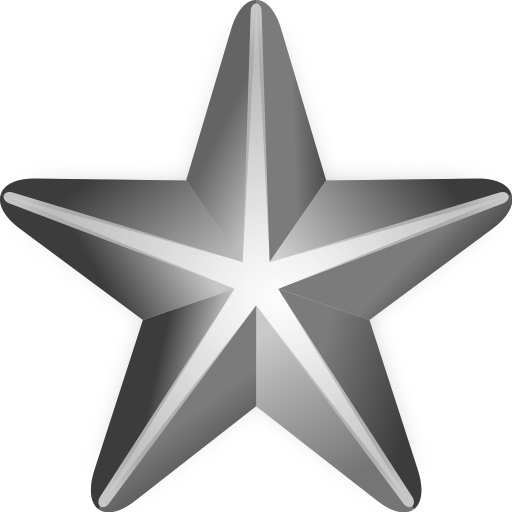
- Award Devices

Precedence
- Next (higher): Texas Border Security and Support Service Ribbon
- Next (lower): Texas Cavalry Service Medal

The Texas Combat Service Ribbon is a campaign/service award of the Texas Military Department that may be issued to a service member of the Texas Military Forces. Subsequent awards are issued by a bronze or silver star device.

== Eligibility ==
The Texas Combat Service Ribbon is awarded to any service member of the Texas Military Forces who:

- After 11 September 2001
- Is deployed outside the United States
- For a period of not less than 30 days
- Serving or flying into a hostile fire zone
- In support of Operation Iraqi Freedom, Operation Enduring Freedom, and any future combat operations

== Authority ==
=== Issuing ===
The Adjutant General of Texas.

=== Legal ===
The Texas Combat Service Ribbon was established by Senator Kel Seliger in Senate Bill 955, authorized by the Seventy-ninth Texas Legislature, and approved by Governor Rick Perry on 17 June 2005, effective the same date.

== See also ==
- Awards and decorations of the Texas Military
- Awards and decorations of the Texas government
- Texas Military Forces
- Texas Military Department
- List of conflicts involving the Texas Military
- Combat Action Ribbon
