= Texas Meritorious Service Award =

- Type: Military award
- Awarded for: Exceptional service and support
- Description: Plaque in the form of a shield
- Presented by: Texas Military Department
- Eligibility: Civilians, organizations, non-Texas service members
- Status: Currently issued
- Established: April 23, 1970

Precedence
- Next (higher): None
- Next (lower): None

The Texas Meritorious Service Award is a Texas military award that may be presented to civilians, organizations, or non-Texas service members for exceptional service and support to the Texas Military Forces.

== Eligibility ==
The Texas Meritorious Service Award may be presented to civilians, organizations, or non-Texas service members for "exceptional service and support to the Texas Military Forces over substantial periods of time". It may also be awarded for "outstanding service and support on special projects and operations". Service members of the Texas Military Forces are ineligible, however it may be awarded to an organization with which a service member is associated.

== Authority ==
The Texas Meritorious Service Award was authorized and approved by Adjutant General Lieutenant General Ross Ayers on 23 April 1970.

== See also ==
- Awards and decorations of the Texas Military
- Awards and decorations of the Texas government
- Texas Military Forces
- Texas Military Department
- List of conflicts involving the Texas Military
