= Texas State Guard Exemplary Service Medal =

Military award

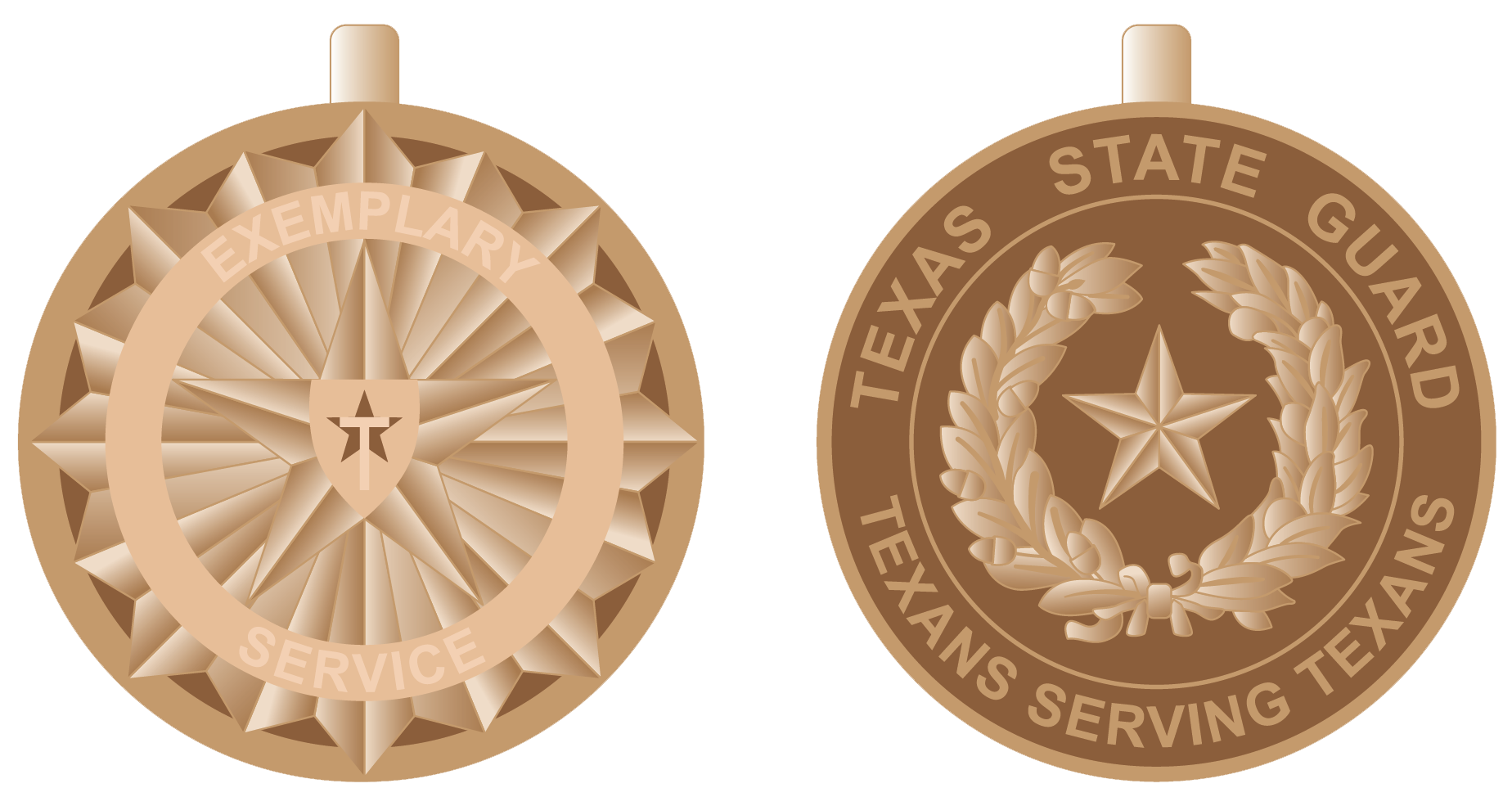
- Type: Military decoration
- Awarded for: Exemplary service or achievement
- Presented by: Texas State Guard
- Status: Currently issued
- Established: May 12, 2021
- Service Ribbon

Precedence
- Next (higher): Texas Adjutant General's Individual Award
- Next (lower): Texas State Guard Meritorious Service Medal

The Texas State Guard Exemplary Service Medal is the eighth highest military decoration that may be conferred to a service member of the Texas Military Forces.

== Eligibility ==
The Texas State Guard Exemplary Service Medal may be award for:
(1) Demonstration of substantial and exceptional service in support of their unit or the TXSG through an act of significance that drives mission completion.
(2) An act of valor or heroism at the risk of life or personal injury that brings significant distinction to their unit and to the TXSG.
(3) The act performed by the individual must unquestionably exceed the service levels expected of other individuals with similar responsibilities.

== Description ==
The medal pendant is of bronze, 1 1/4 inches in diameter. On the obverse side of the pendant, is a faceted sixteen-pointed star with triangular rays. Beginning at the top triangular ray at the 12 o’clock position, each alternate ray reaches the edge of the pendant, with the rays in-between reaching 1/25 inch from the edge of the pendant. Atop the sixteen-pointed star is a Texas Ranger style medal shape with an outer ring 15/16 inches in diameter, and with the seal of the Texas State Guard centred on the star. The seal is a shield on which is a five-pointed star, one point up, over which is the raised letter, "T". The outer ring is encircled with the words, "EXEMPLARY" above the star, and "SERVICE" below the star. On the reverse side of the pendant is a five-pointed raised star, one point up, 3/8 of an inch in diameter, surrounded by a wreath formed by an olive branch on the right and a live oak branch on the left, encircled by the words, "TEXAS STATE GUARD", along the upper arc and "TEXANS SERVING TEXANS”, along the lower arc, in raised letters.

== Ribbon ==
The pendant is suspended by a ring from a rayon moiré ribbon, 1 3/8 inches long and 1 3/8 inches wide, composed of five vertical stripes. The first stripe is Golden Orange #67109 (1/4 of an inch), followed by Purple #67115 (1/8 of an inch), Golden Orange (5/8 of an inch), Purple (1/8 of an inch), and Golden Orange (1/4 of an inch).

== Devices ==
A bronze star award device shall be used for succeeding award, and silver star is worn instead of five bronze stars. A bronze "V" award device shall be used for valor or heroism acts.

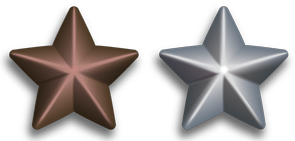

== See also ==
- Awards and decorations of the Texas Military
- Awards and decorations of the Texas government
- Texas Military Forces
- Texas Military Department
