= Texas Governor's Unit Citation =

- Type: Military decoration
- Awarded for: Valor, achievement, or exceptional service
- Description: The ribbon drape is of blue, white and red stripes.
- Presented by: Texas Military Department
- Eligibility: Texas Military Forces
- Status: Currently awarded

Precedence
- Next (higher): Texas State Guard Physical Fitness Ribbon
- Next (lower): Texas Meritorious Unit Award

The Texas Governor's Unit Citation is the highest unit award of the Texas Military Forces. Subsequent awards are issued by a bronze or silver twig of four oak leaves with three acorns on the stem device.

The Adjutant General of Texas is the awarding authority for this decoration. A general officer must present it. The Governor's Unit Citation was authorized and approved by the Adjutant General of Texas in May 1979 effective same date.

== Notable units ==
| 31 Jan 1993 | Texas Military Unit | 49th Armored Division | Citation | 1993-17 | Reference |

== See also ==
- Awards and decorations of the Texas Military
- Awards and decorations of the Texas government
- Texas Military Forces
- Texas Military Department
- List of conflicts involving the Texas Military
