= Sam Houston Award Medal =

- Type: Service decoration
- Awarded for: Service
- Description: The neck ribbon is red, yellow and green striped. The medal is a bronze Maltese cross with a circle containing the coat of arms of the Texas State Guard with olive and live oak branches on either side. Around the circle are the words "Texas State Guard Association".
- Presented by: Texas
- Eligibility: Awarded to members of the Texas Military Forces or the Association
- Status: Currently awarded.
- Ribbon of Sam Houston Award Medal

== Eligibility ==
The Sam Houston Award Medal is a medal within the awards and decorations of the Texas State Guard Nonprofit Association that may be awarded to a member of the Texas Military Forces. This includes Air National Guard, Army National Guard, and State Guard.

== Use ==
The Sam Houston Award Medal is awarded by the Texas State Guard Nonprofit Association for exceptional achievement furthering the aims and goals of the Nation, State, Community, Texas Military Forces, and the Texas State Guard Nonprofit Association. The nominee must be considered a visionary whose distinguished service was conducted with the highest military standard of integrity, leadership, patriotism, and professionalism. The actions of the nominee must include 5 years of service to Texas Military Forces or the Association. The nominee must also be a current member or associate member of the Texas State Guard Nonprofit Association or must be a current or former member of the Military Forces of the State of Texas. Second and additional receipt of this award is indicated by a gold star.
