= Texas Faithful Service Medal =

- Type: Military award
- Awarded for: Service
- Description: The ribbon drape is of red, old gold, and blue stripes. The medal is bronze with an emblem with crossed olive and live oak branches and the words "Faithful Service" and "Texas National Guard" on the obverse. The reverse contains the Coat of Arms of Texas and the words "Texas National Guard" and "For Service".
- Presented by: Texas Military Department
- Eligibility: Texas Military Forces
- Status: Currently issued
- Established: March 20, 1930
- Texas Faithful Service Medal medal ribbon

Precedence
- Next (higher): Texas Cold War Medal
- Next (lower): Texas Service Medal

The Texas Faithful Service Medal is a campaign/service award of the Texas Military Department that may be issued to a service member of the Texas Military Forces. Subsequent awards are denoted by a cactus device.

Issuance of the Texas Faithful Service Medal requires authorization by the Texas State Guard Commanding General or a Texas National Guard Lieutenant Colonel, and presentation to the awardee by the next higher level of command.

== See also ==
- Awards and decorations of the Texas Military
- Awards and decorations of the Texas government
- Texas Military Forces
- Texas Military Department
- List of conflicts involving the Texas Military
