= Texas Wing Civil Air Patrol =

Highest echelon of the Civil Air Patrol in Texas, United States

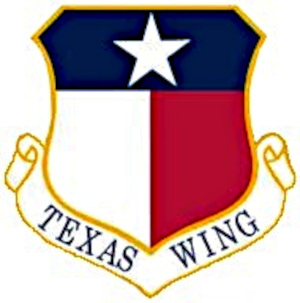
- Texas Wing of Civil Air Patrol

Associated branches
- United States Air Force

Command staff
- Commander: Col Donald Gulliksen
- Deputy Commander: Lt Col Clyde Woolfolk; Lt Col James Peace; Lt Col Janet Kristoffersen
- Chief of Staff: Maj Roger Reed
- Deputy Chief of Staff: Capt Liza Smith

Current statistics
- Cadets: 2,517
- Seniors: 1,884
- Total Membership: 4,401
- Website: txwg.cap.gov
- Statistics as of 9 July 2025

The Texas Wing of the Civil Air Patrol (TXWG) is the highest echelon of Civil Air Patrol in the state of Texas. Texas Wing headquarters are located in Nacogdoches, Texas. The Texas Wing consists of over 4,000 cadet and adult members at over 70 locations across the state of Texas.

== Mission ==
The Texas Wing, along with the Civil Air Patrol as a whole, has three primary missions: emergency services, cadet programs and aerospace education.

=== Emergency services ===
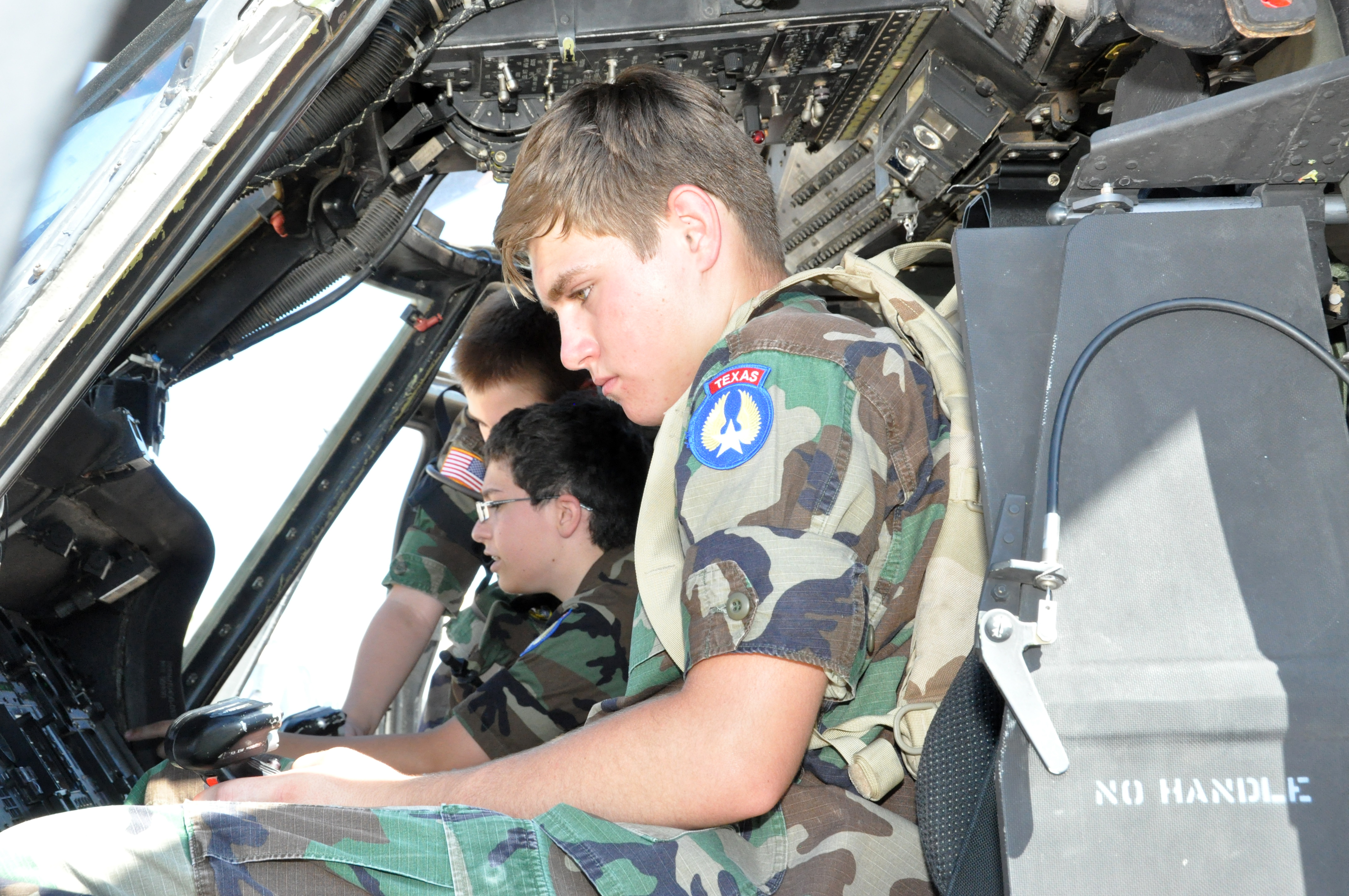
A Texas CAP cadet sits in the pilot's seat of an HH-60 Pave Hawk helicopter belonging to the 305th Rescue Squadron.

Emergency services provided by the Texas Wing of CAP include search and rescue, disaster relief, and humanitarian services. Texas CAP members have provided assistance in border patrol operations, search and rescue missions, and drug interdiction missions.

In 2020, the Texas Wing was activated to assist in Texas' response to the COVID-19 pandemic. Pilots with the Texas Wing flew lab samples from across the state to a laboratory in Austin to be tested for the coronavirus.

=== Cadet programs ===
Texas runs a cadet program, which is organized among military lines and emphasizes Air Force traditions and values. Every summer and winter, CAP cadets from Texas and other wings may sign up for a training course located at the Texas Wing Civil Air Patrol Encampment at various military bases around Texas where cadets study military customs and courtesies, military drill, aerospace, and future opportunities in Civil Air Patrol.

=== Aerospace education ===
The CAP provides education for both CAP members and the general public, including education provided through the education system. Teachers can join CAP as Aerospace Education Members (AEM) and access resources available through the CAP, the Air Force, and NASA.

== Organization ==
The Texas Wing of the Civil Air Patrol is organized into squadrons, which are assigned into one of seven groups, based on their geographical location.

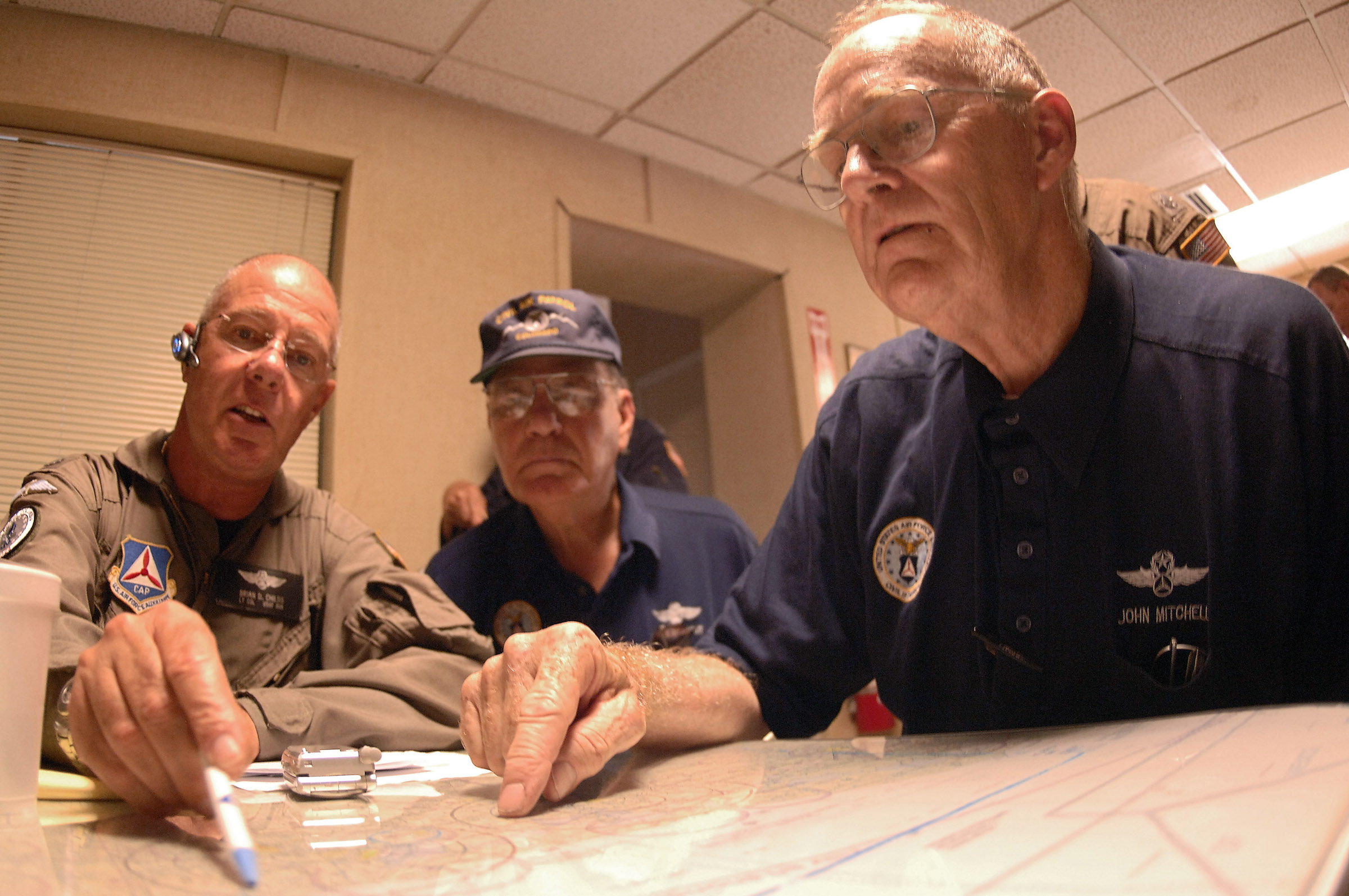
Lt. Col. Brian Childes (left) briefs Lt. Col. Bob Beabout (pilot) and Major John Mitchell (right) on a sortie to Sabine Lake, Texas following Hurricane Rita.

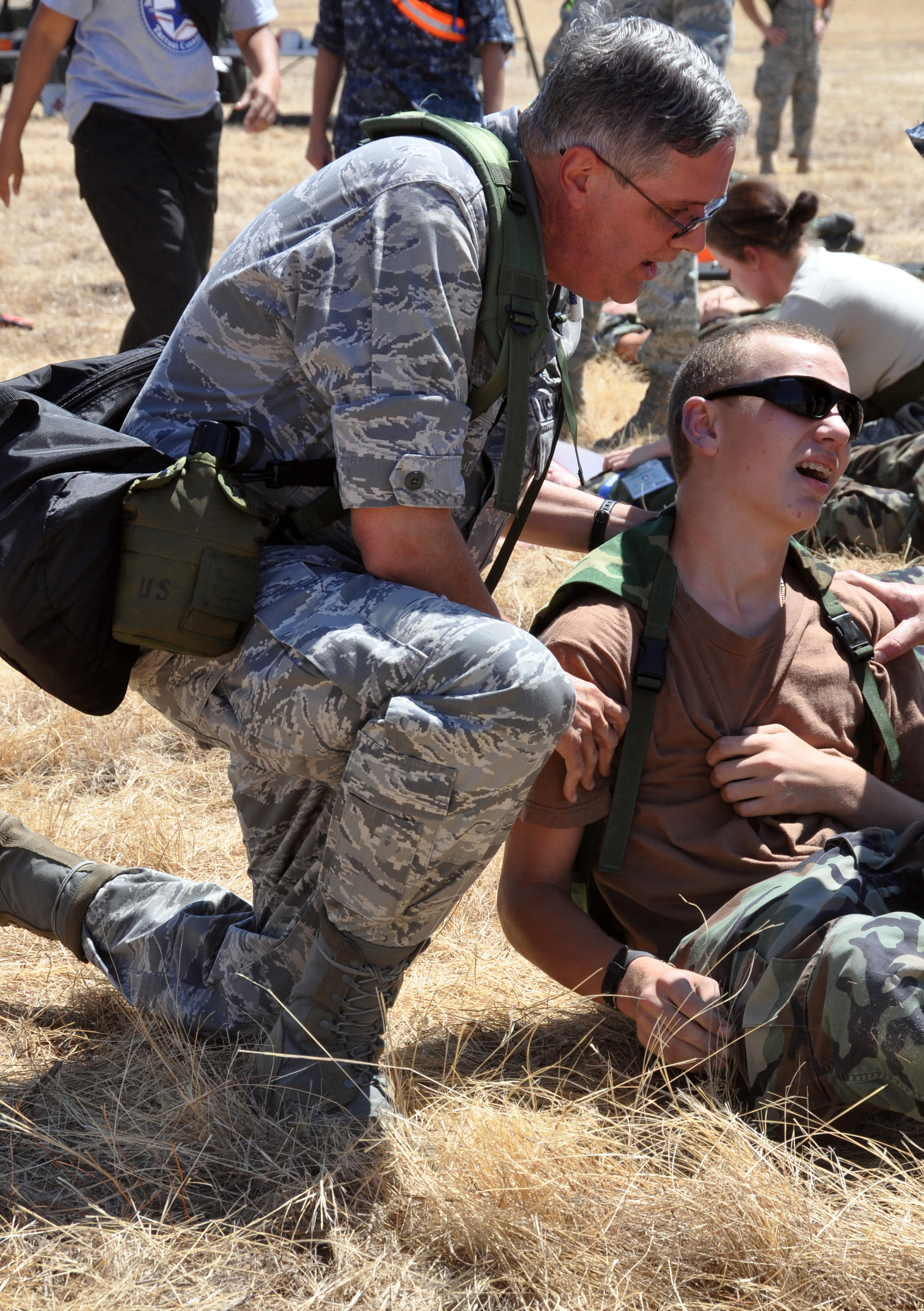
Colonel Richard Walters, commander 301st MDS, left, evaluates a simulated casualty, played by a Civil Air Patrol cadet.

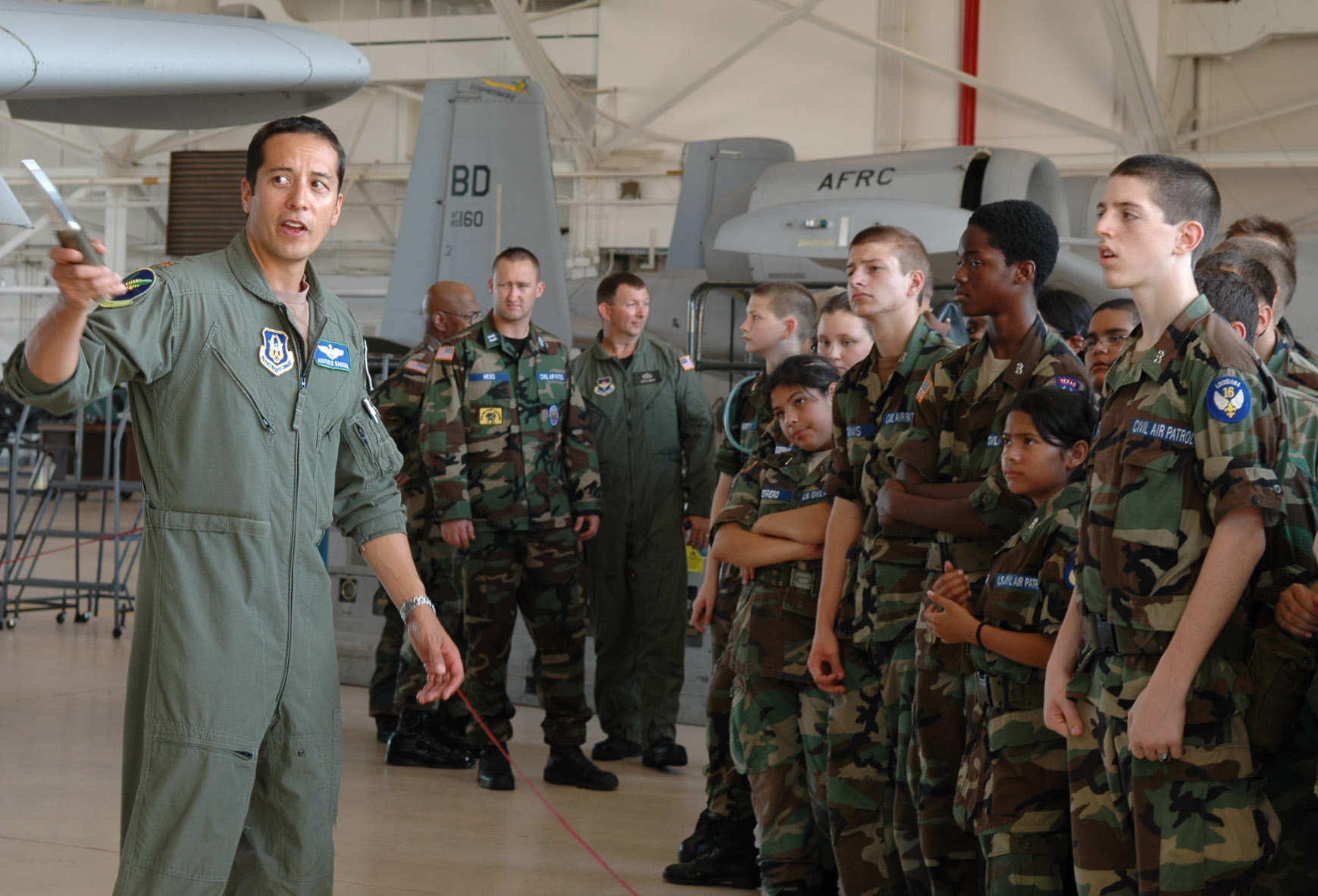
Major Aristotle Rabanal shows off an A-10 to CAP cadets from Louisiana and Texas.

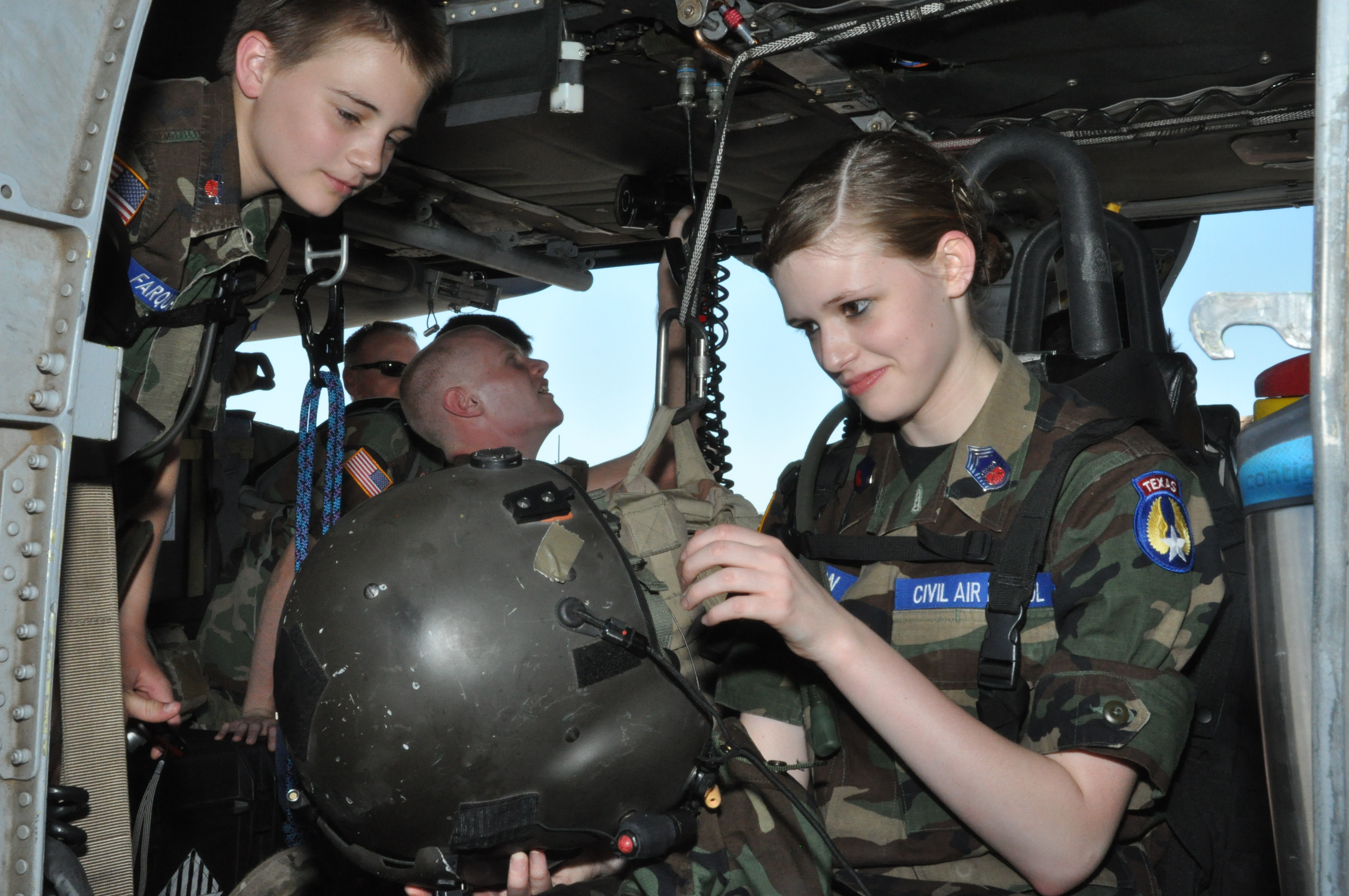
Texas Civil Air Patrol cadets examine a helicopter and equipment belonging to the 305th Rescue Squadron

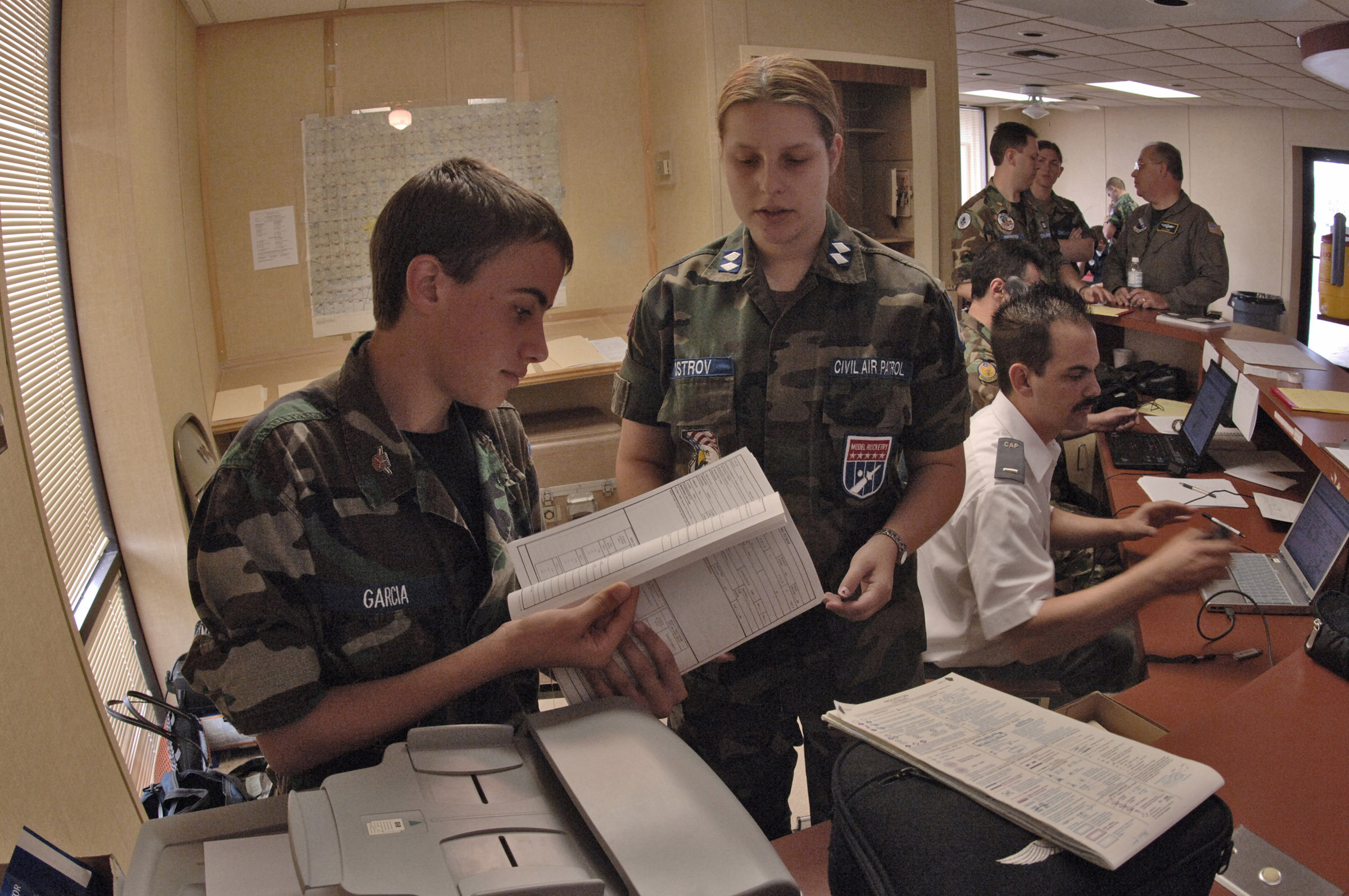
Texas Wing CAP cadets perform administrative duties at the West Houston Airport following Hurricane Katrina.

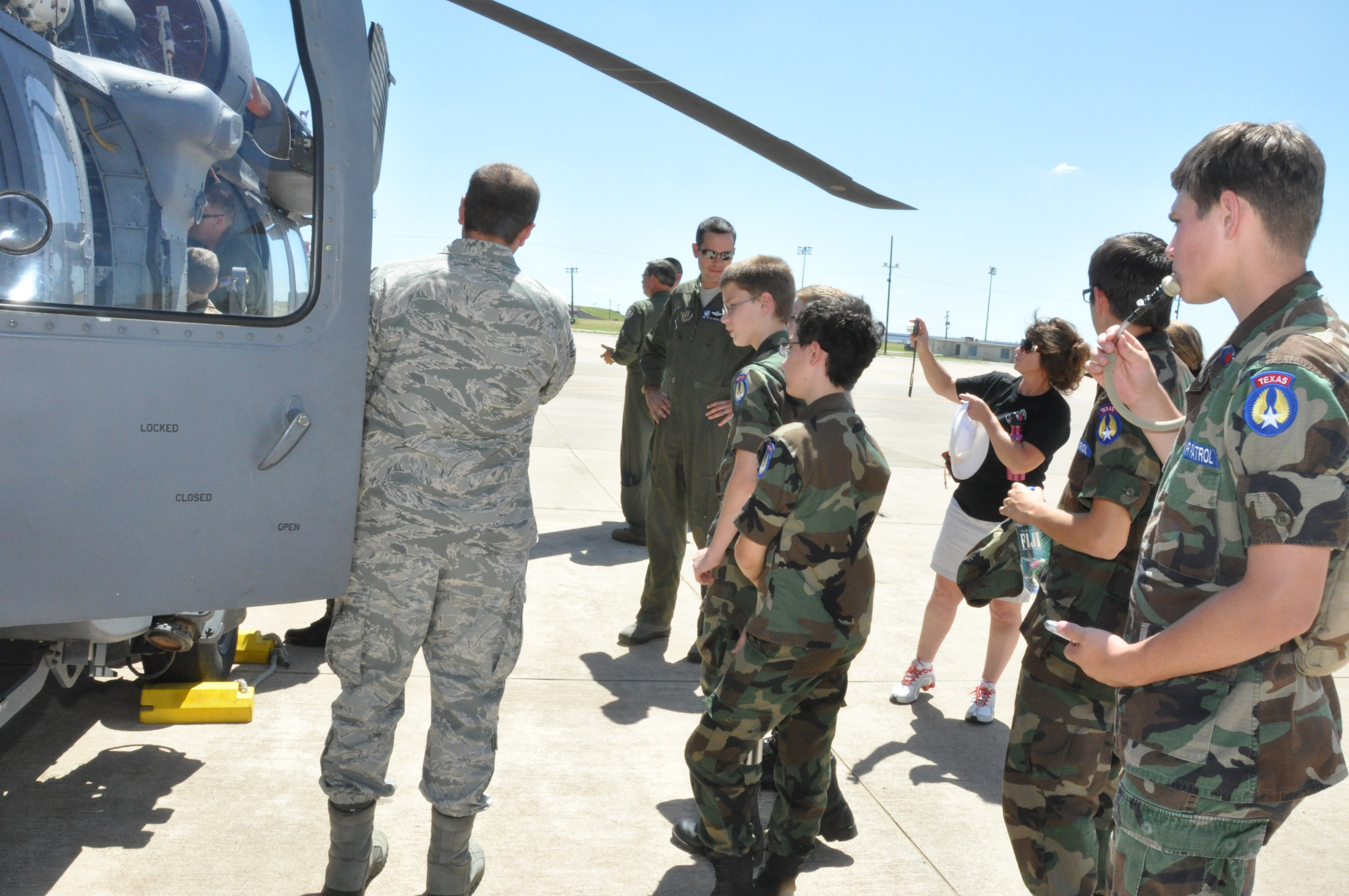
Texas CAP cadets during a tour of an Air Force at the Naval Air Station Fort Worth Joint Reserve Base.

Squadrons of the Texas Wing
Group	Designation	Squadron Name	Location	Notes
Wing HQ	TX-001	Texas Wing HQ	Nacogdoches	
	TX-817	Newman Academy Cadet	Cedar Hill	
	TX-999	Texas Legislative	N/A	
Group I	TX-010	Group I HQ		
	TX-023	San Angelo Composite	San Angelo	
	TX-123	Three Rivers Composite	San Angelo	
	TX-215	El Paso Composite	El Paso	
	TX-293	Lubbock Composite	Lubbock	
	TX-313	Abilene Composite	Abilene	
	TX-353	Tigershark Composite	Amarillo	
Group II	TX-020	Group II HQ		
	TX-051	Plano Mustangs Composite	Plano	
	TX-085	Tyler Composite	Tyler	
	TX-089	Gregg County Composite	Longview	
	TX-262	Texoma Composite	Denison	
	TX-295	Thunderbolt Composite	Allen	
	TX-354	Lakeshore Composite	Rockwall	
	TX-450	Sulphur Springs Composite	Sulphur Springs	
	TX-455	Nacogdoches Composite	Nacogdoches	
Group III	TX-030	Group III HQ		
	TX-076	Crusader Composite	Grand Prairie	
	TX-133	Irving Composite	Irving	
	TX-148	Waco Composite	Waco	
	TX-214	Black Sheep Composite	Mesquite	
	TX-376	Midway Composite	Midlothian	
	TX-377	Corsicana Cadet	Corsicana	
	TX-390	Addison Eagles Senior	Addison	
	TX-391	Dallas Composite	Dallas	
	TX-428	Redbird Composite	Dallas	
	TX-803	Red Oak Cadet	Red Oak	
	TX-810	Italy Cadet	Italy	
Group IV	TX-040	Group IV HQ		
	TX-041	George H.W. Bush Composite	College Station	
	TX-098	Ellington Composite	Houston	
	TX-176	7-6 Air Cavalry Composite	Conroe	
	TX-177	Sam Houston Composite	Cleveland	
	TX-179	Thunderbird Composite	Houston	
	TX-186	Spindletop Cadet	Beaumont	
	TX-268	Baytown Senior	Beach City	
	TX-334	Delta Composite	Spring	
	TX-360	Sugar Land Composite	Sugar Land	
	TX-409	Marauder Composite	Kingwood	
	TX-447	West Houston S.A.B.R.E. Senior	Houston	
	TX-451	Hobby Senior	Houston	
	TX-802	Sheldon Cadet	Houston	
	TX-808	East Houston Cadet	Houston	
Group V	TX-050	Group V HQ		
	TX-007	Lackland Cadet	San Antonio	
	TX-047	Laughlin Air Force Base Flight	Laughlin Air Force Base	
	TX-142	Randolph Composite	Randolph Air Force Base	
	TX-187	Alamo Composite	San Antonio	
	TX-351	Pegasus Composite	Austin	
	TX-352	Col. Joe W Kittinger Phantom Senior	Austin	
	TX-371	Apollo Composite	Georgetown	
	TX-403	Bell County Composite	Temple	
	TX-424	Bexar County Senior	San Antonio	
	TX-435	David Lee (Tex) Hill Composite	San Marcos	
	TX-442	Kerrville Composite	Kerrville	
Group VI	TX-060	Group VI HQ		
	TX-035	Alliance Composite	Fort Worth	
	TX-087	Weatherford Patriot	Weatherford	
	TX-129	Fort Worth Senior	Fort Worth	
	TX-154	South Fort Worth Diamondback Composite	Fort Worth	
	TX-388	Phoenix Composite	Fort Worth	
	TX-413	Nighthawk Composite	Denton	
	TX-430	Rio del Fierro Composite	Wichita Falls	
	TX-441	Granbury Composite	Granbury	
	TX-456	Azle Composite	Azle	
Group VII	TX-070	Group VII HQ		
	TX-026	Corpus Christi Composite	Corpus Christi	
	TX-091	Brownsville Composite	Brownsville	
	TX-241	Wild Horse Desert Composite	McAllen	
	TX-386	Victoria Composite	Victoria	

== See also ==
- Texas Air National Guard
- Texas State Guard
