= Texas Adjutant General's Individual Award =

Military award

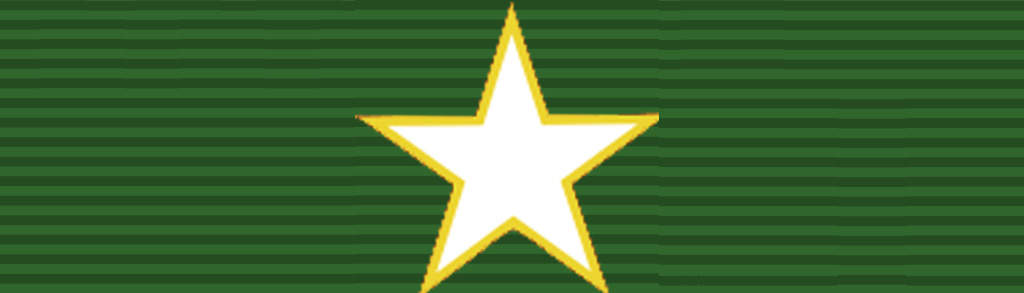
- Type: Military decoration
- Awarded for: Exceptional service or achievement
- Description: The ribbon is green with a white star
- Presented by: Texas Military Department
- Eligibility: Texas Military Forces
- Status: Currently issued
- Established: November 1, 1968
- Decoration device

Precedence
- Next (higher): Texas Medal of Merit
- Next (lower): Texas State Guard Exemplary Service Medal

The Adjutant General's Individual Award is the eighth highest military decoration that can be conferred to a service member of the Texas Military Forces. Subsequent decorations are conferred by a white enameled five-pointed star trimmed in gold device.

The Adjutant General's Individual Award was approved by the Adjutant General Major General Thomas S. Bishop on 1 November 1968.

== See also ==
- Awards and decorations of the Texas Military
- Awards and decorations of the Texas government
- Texas Military Forces
- Texas Military Department
- List of conflicts involving the Texas Military
