= Texas Medal of Merit =

- Type: Military decoration
- Awarded for: Exceptional service or achievement
- Description: The ribbon drape is of red, blue and gold stripes. The medal is bronze with a star and crossed olive and live oak leaves and the words "Meritorious Service Texas National Guard" on the obverse. On the reverse is the Coat of Arms of Texas and the words "Texas National Guard" and "For Service."
- Presented by: Texas Military Department
- Eligibility: Texas Military Forces
- Status: Currently issued
- Established: March 20, 1930
- Texas Medal of Merit medal ribbon

Precedence
- Next (higher): Texas Outstanding Service Medal
- Next (lower): Texas Adjutant General's Award

The Texas Medal of Merit, formerly known as the Texas Meritorious Service Medal, is the seventh highest military decoration that can be conferred to a service member of the Texas Military Forces. Subsequent decorations are denoted by a bronze or silver acorn device. A "V" device is conferred for an act or acts of courage.

== Notable recipients ==
Date	Service Member	Notability	Citation	Reference
	Brigadier General Donald W. Peacock	Hall of Honor inductee	East Texas Oilfield Riot, 1931	
	Lieutenant General Thomas S. Bishop	Hall of Honor inductee	Hurricane Alice, 1954	
	Colonel Dale M. Pyeatt	Hall of Honor inductee		
	Chief Warrant Officer Lewis O. King	Hall of Honor inductee		

== See also ==
- Awards and decorations of the Texas Military
- Awards and decorations of the Texas government
- Texas Military Forces
- Texas Military Department
- List of conflicts involving the Texas Military
