= Texas State Guard =

- Seal of the Texas State Guard
- Founded: 18 February 1823; 203 years ago (as Texian Militia)
- Country: United States
- Allegiance: State of Texas
- Type: State military
- Role: Civil affairs
- Size: 1,542
- Part of: Texas Military Department: Texas Military Forces
- Headquarters: Building 32; Camp Mabry, Austin, Texas 30°18′42.173″N 97°45′38.338″W
- Mottos: "Duty First; Texas Always."
- Colors: Red, white, and blue
- March: "Texas, Our Texas"
- Anniversaries: 18 February, 10 February
- Website: tmd.texas.gov/texas-state-guard

Commanders
- Commander-in-Chief: Governor Greg Abbott
- Adjutant General: Major General Thomas M. Suelzer
- Commander: Major General Roger Sheridan
- Command Sergeant Major: Command Sergeant Major Jerry Kovar

Insignia
- Shoulder Sleeve Insignia

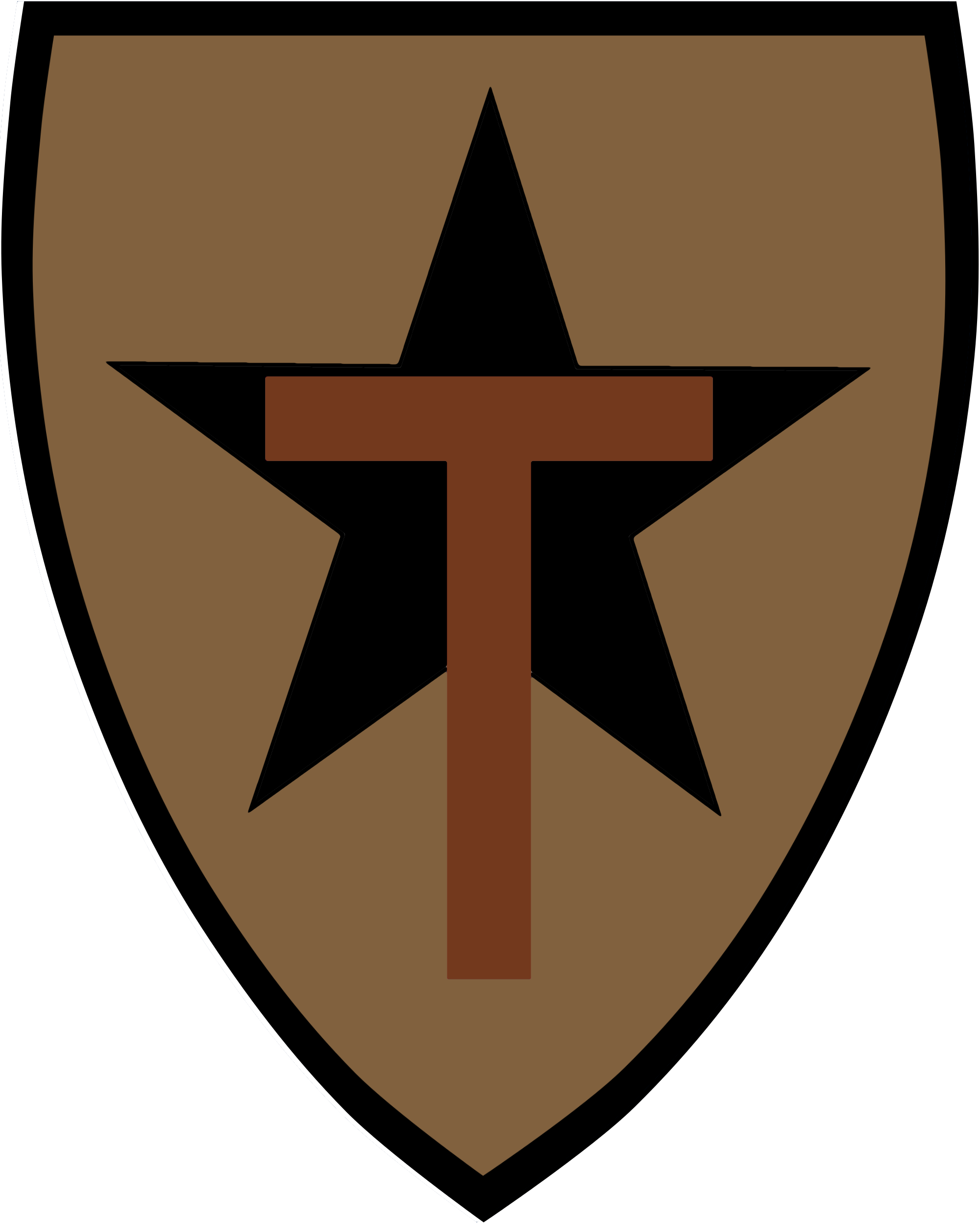
- Subdued SSI

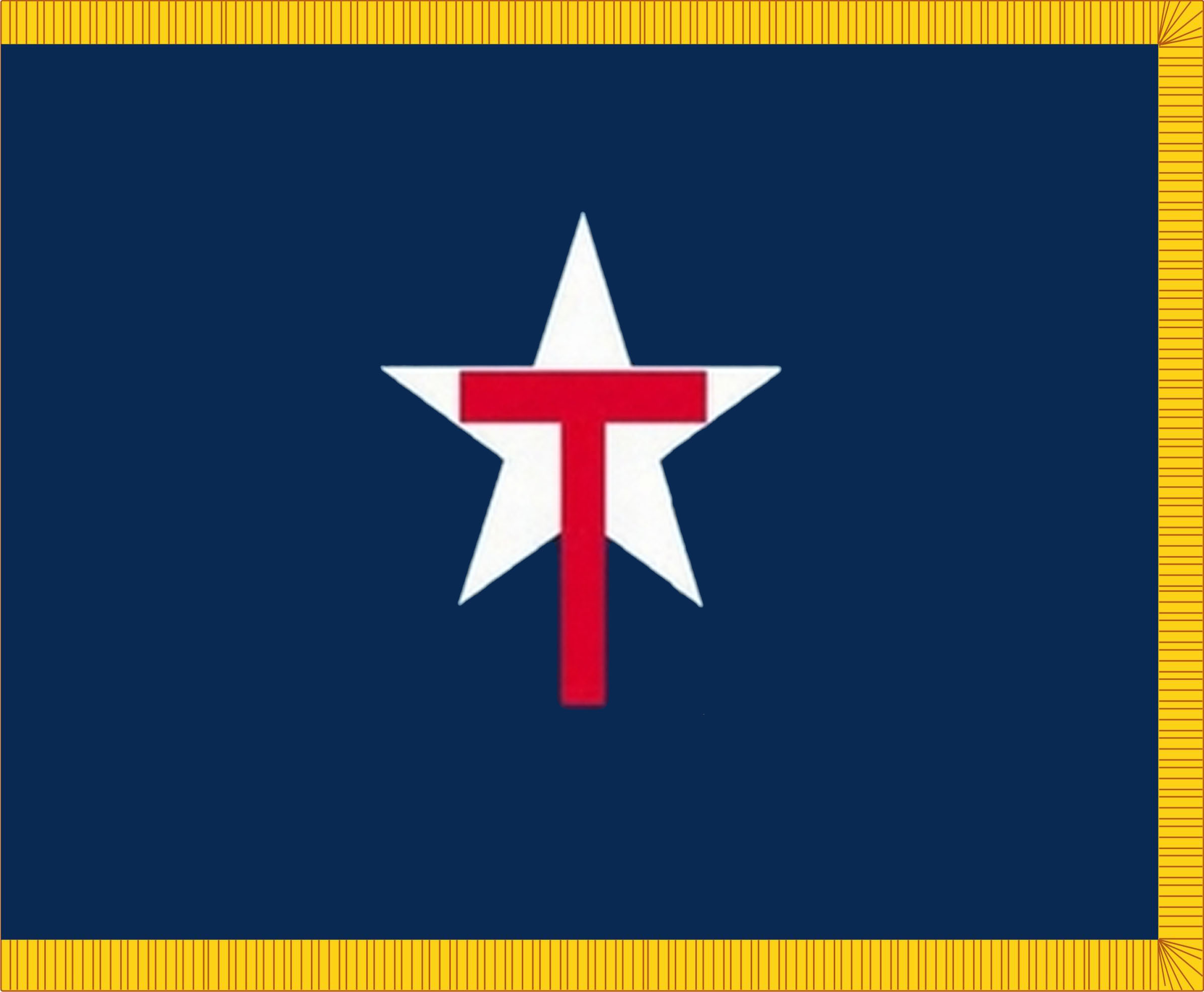
- Standard

- Beret flash

The Texas State Guard (TXSG) is part of the state military force of Texas, and one of three branches of the Texas Military Forces. Along with the other two branches, the TXSG falls under the command of the governor of Texas and is administered by the adjutant general, an appointee of the governor. The other two branches of the Texas Military Forces are the Texas Army National Guard and the Texas Air National Guard.

The mission of the Texas State Guard (TXSG) is to provide mission-ready military forces to assist state and local authorities in times of state emergencies, to conduct homeland security and mission support activities under the umbrella of Defense Support to Civil Authorities, and to augment the Texas Army National Guard and Texas Air National Guard as required.

Headquartered at Camp Mabry in Austin, Texas, the TXSG functions as an organized state military under the authority of Title 32 of the U.S. Code and Chapter 431 of the Texas Government Code. The Governor of Texas has sole control over the Texas State Guard, because it is not subject to federal activation.

== Structure ==
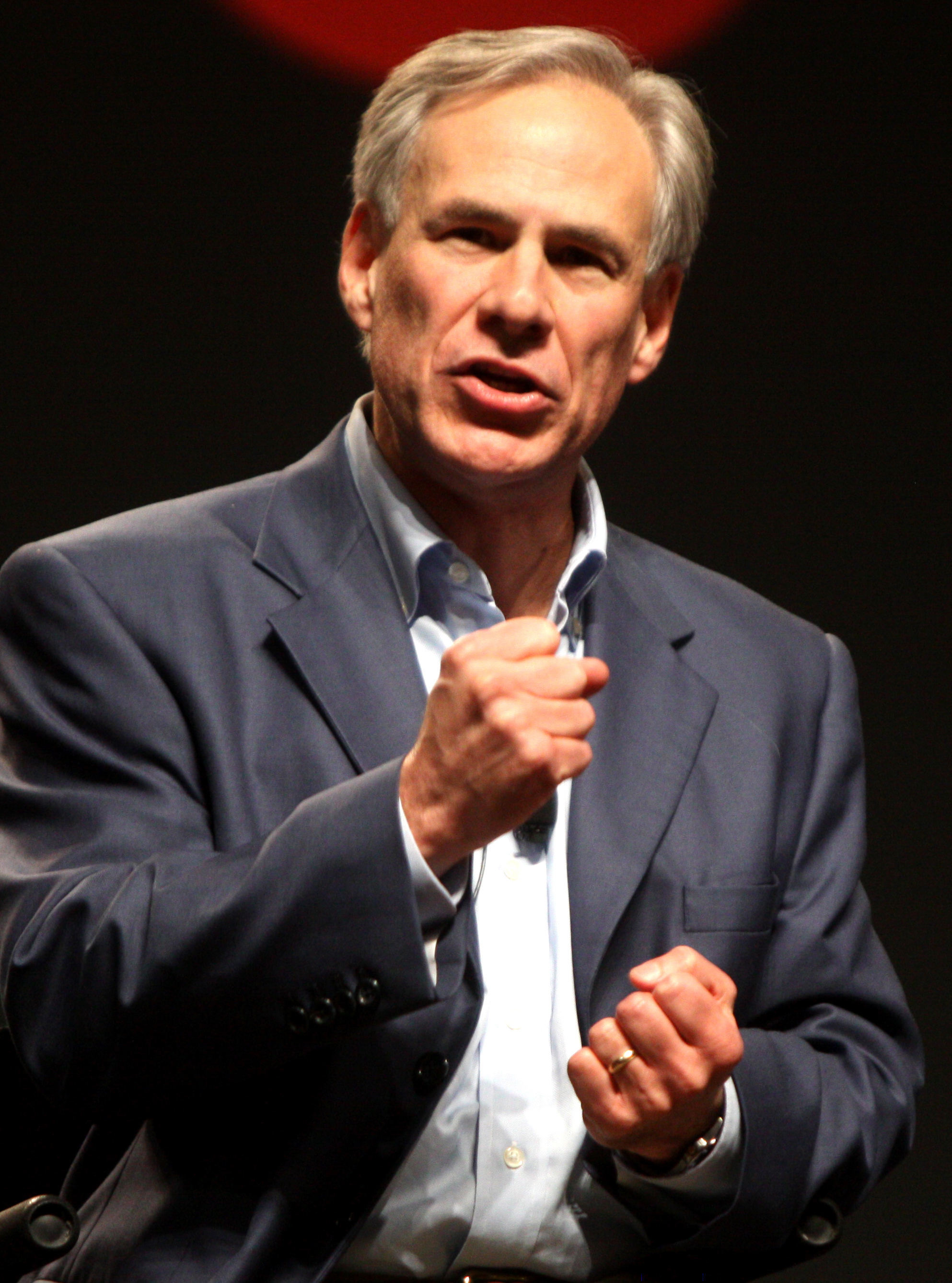
Governor of Texas Greg Abbott Commander in Chief.

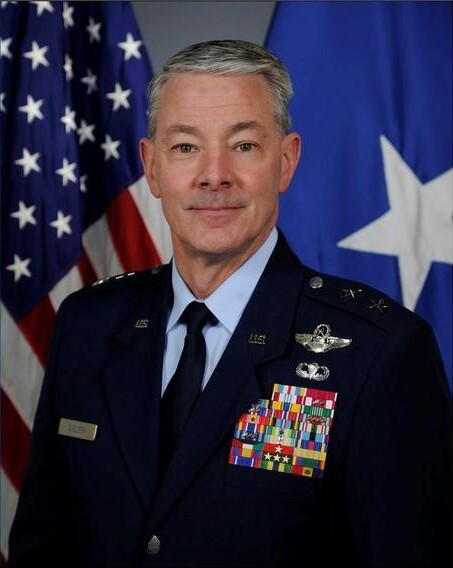
Adjutant General Texas Military Forces Major General Thomas M. Suelzer

The Texas State Guard is a state defense force that assists and augments the Texas Military Department and civil authorities in times of state emergencies, and on-going support of National Guard units and local communities. It is not part of the U.S. Armed Forces and operates as a state-organized and controlled volunteer force.

The Texas State Guard consists of four Civil Affairs Brigades, each containing four battalions. Specialty units exist at the company level for tasks such as search and rescue, watercraft operation, diving, and security.

Guardsmen's entry rank depends on prior federal military service and/or civilian education. Individuals with no prior military service or ROTC training must attend the Basic Orientation Training (BOT) course.

Texas State Guard personnel actively support the state in the event of catastrophic events, and ongoing state military missions. Guardsmen receive duty pay when activated by the Governor and placed on paid state active duty.

The organizational structure follows the federal military component structure, with comparable positions, ranks, protocols, and authorities. Guardsmen wear the Texas military uniform according to a branch of service (in accordance with branch regulations) in regards to state military forces when conducting activities while on duty. TXSG personnel are also eligible for the same State issued military awards and decorations as members of the Texas Army & Air National Guard. For example, deployed members of the Texas State Guard received the Governor's Unit Citation for Hurricane Katrina and Rita relief in 2005.

The governor is the commander in chief of the Texas State Guard. Article 4, Section 7 of the Texas Constitution states that "He shall be Commander-in-Chief of the military forces of the State, except when they are called into actual service of the United States. He shall have the power to call forth the militia to execute the laws of the State, to suppress insurrections, and to repel invasions."

Command

The Commanding General of the State Guard is Major General Roger Sheridan. The Command Senior Enlisted Leader is Command Sergeant Major Jerry Kovar.

Units

- 1st Brigade, Dallas-Fort Worth
- 2nd Brigade, Houston
- 3rd Brigade, Corpus Christi
- 6th Brigade, Austin

== History ==
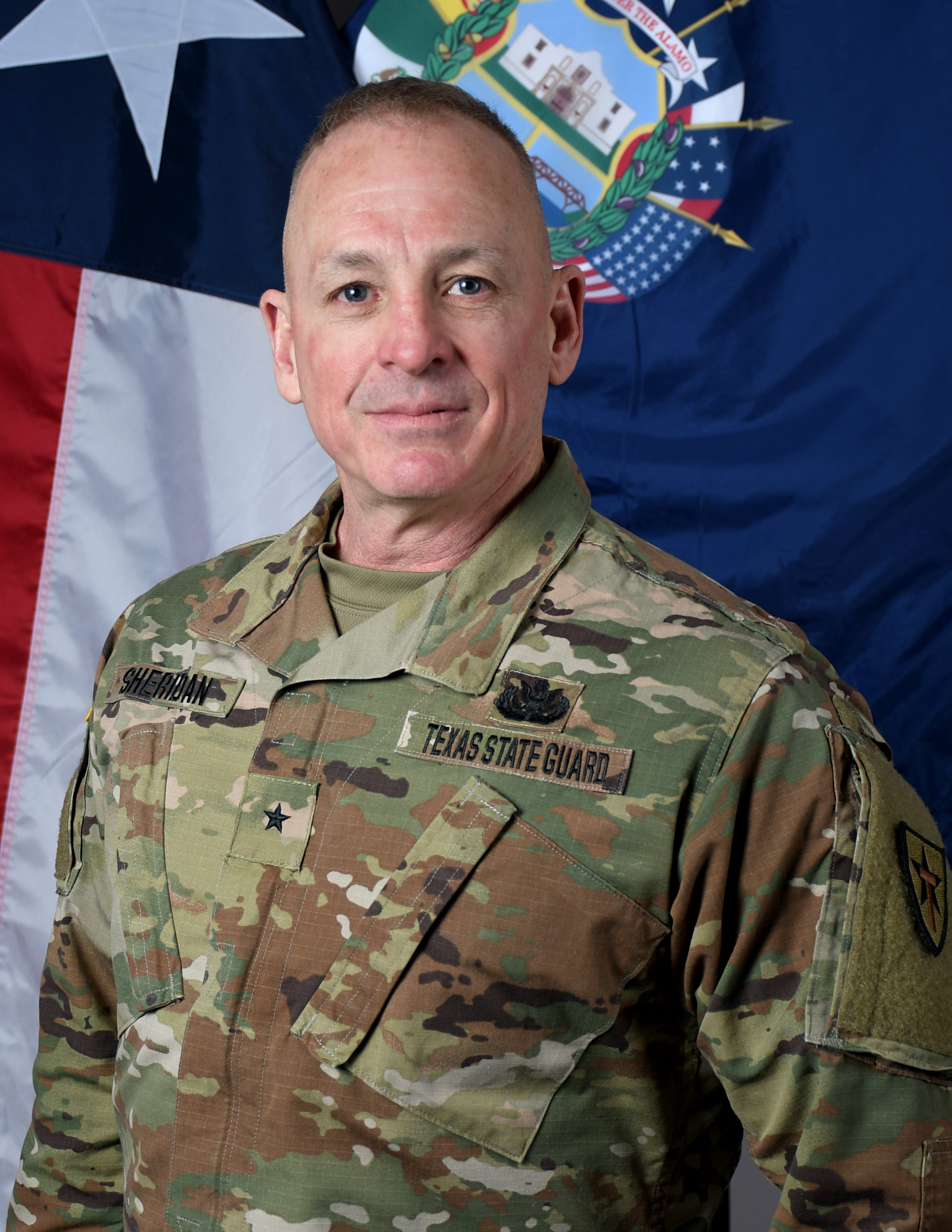
Major General Roger Sheridan, Commander, Texas State Guard

The Texas State Guard has its roots in Stephen F. Austin's colonial militia. On February 18, 1823, Emperor of Mexico, Agustín de Iturbide, authorized Austin who was the leader of the first non-Spanish efforts of Texas settlement "to organize the colonists into a body of the national militia, to preserve tranquility." Austin was appointed to the rank of lieutenant colonel and allowed the colonists to elect all subordinate militia officers. Soon after, Austin's militia was authorized to make war on Indian tribes who were hostile and molested the settlement. In 1827, in a move contrary to modern perceptions of Anglo-Texan colonists in Mexico, Austin's militia mobilized in support of the Mexican government to put down the Fredonian Rebellion, a group of Americans who tried to declare a part of Texas as an independent republic separate from Mexico.

In 1835, all of the local militias in Texas were annexed by Sam Houston to provide a unified military command for the provisional government of the Republic of Texas. After becoming an independent republic in 1836, these forces were aligned with the Army of the Republic of Texas. In 1845, with the annexation of Texas by the United States, this structure was supplanted by the United States Army, but local militia companies were maintained for a ready response. After secession from the United States in 1861, existing militia companies rallied and new militia regiments were formed which were made available to the various armies of the Confederacy.

It was officially reorganized as the "State Guard" in 1871 during Reconstruction to unify the independent militia companies and regiments throughout the state and continued in operation until 1903, when it was replaced by the nationalized Texas Army National Guard. It was revived in 1941, after thousands of Texan troops were deployed overseas in World War II, to provide state military forces and support for wartime civil defense.

When the National Guard was mobilized for service in the First World War, the federal legislature recognized the need for state troops to replace the National Guard. A law was passed authorizing the formation of home defense forces for the duration of the war. While Texas passed the necessary enabling statutes, it did not form such an organization. As World War II made mobilization of the National Guard again likely, steps were taken to provide for state troops as replacements for the National Guard. The Texas Legislature passed the Defense Act, HB 45, and the Governor signed the bill on 10 February 1941. This time, a force was organized, with the task falling to Brigadier General J. Watt Page, the Adjutant General of Texas. Within a year, the Texas Defense Guard numbered 17,497 officers and enlisted men. This number was in sharp contrast to the 11,633 members of the Texas National Guard mustered into federal service some months before. The Texas Defense Guard was organized into fifty independent battalions, each composed of a varying number of companies and a headquarters.

The federal legislation authorizing them expired on 25 July 1947. This was not taken lightly in some states and most notably in Texas. In that same year, the State Legislature authorized the Texas State Guard Reserve Corps. It was activated in January, 1948. The Reserve Corps continued in existence until ten years after the Congress had once again authorized state guards in 1955. Under statutes enacted by the 59th Legislature, the Texas State Guard Reserve Corps was abolished and Texas State Guard was again authorized and organized on 30 August 1965.

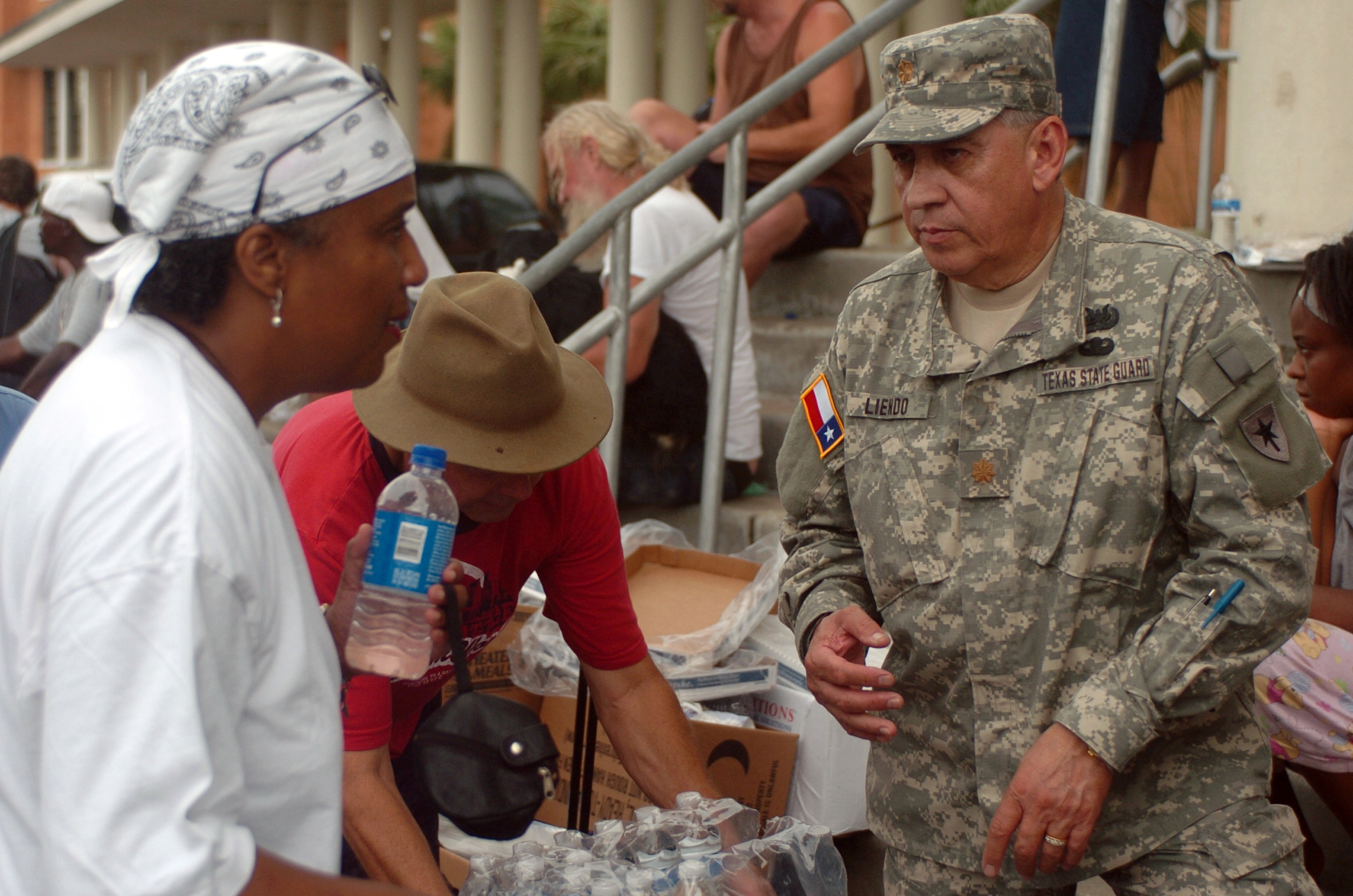
Maj. Liendo Alvaro, a Laredo, Texas native with the Texas State Guard Medical Brigade, talks to a Galveston resident while she is waiting for a bus to leave the island.

First made up of independent battalions, it was later organized along regimental lines, and at one time also included brigade-sized elements. It was first organized as Infantry and "Internal Security" units. After the early 1970s, it was organized as Military Police with companies assigned to battalions for control and the battalions, in turn, assigned to groups. For several years, there were six Military Police Groups with boundaries generally following those of Texas Department of Public Safety command districts.

In 1979, the 7th Military Police Group was formed to provide for command and control over remaining separate battalions in East Texas. A reorganization in 1980 resulted in the formation of the 8th and 9th Military Police Groups in San Antonio and Dallas. The original six groups were headquartered in Fort Worth, Houston, the Rio Grande Valley, Midland, Lubbock, and Austin.

In 1993, Texas State Guard was reorganized into regiments and the old group designations disappeared. Regimental headquarters were established in San Antonio (1st), Austin (2nd), Fort Worth (4th), Houston (8th), Dallas (19th), and Lubbock (39th). In ceremonies held in Killeen in July 1993, during the Texas State Guard Association convention, the newly organized regiments were presented with their new colors by the incumbent general officers and three retired general officers of the Texas State Guard. For the first time since World War II, the regiments were authorized distinctive unit insignia for wear by assigned personnel. In March, 1995, a seventh regiment, the 9th, was organized in El Paso from elements of the 39th. This added regiment did not survive though and personnel were returned to the 39th in 1999.

The Texas State Guard has partaken in Operation Lone Star, an ongoing joint operation between the Texas Department of Public Safety and the Texas Military Department along the United States–Mexico border in southern Texas to combat illegal immigration, drug smuggling and human trafficking.

== Legal protection ==
Employers in the state of Texas are required under Texas law to provide a leave of absence to any employees who are members of the Texas State Guard (or any other state's military forces) whenever these employees are activated to take part in training, drill, or to take part in an emergency mission. Employers must reinstate these employees to their former employment positions following their deployments, without loss of time, efficiency rating, vacation time, or any benefit of employment during or because of the absence.

== Recent operations ==
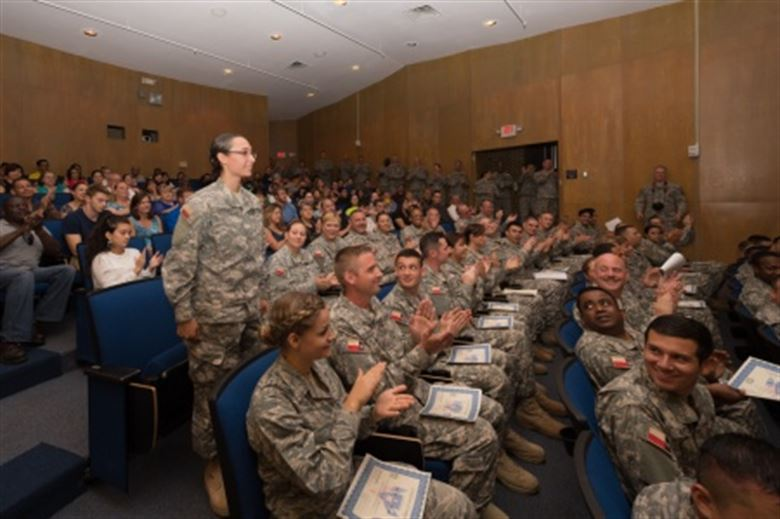
Regional Basic Orientation Training Class 010 recognizes Pvt. Angeline Sanchez as its honor graduate.

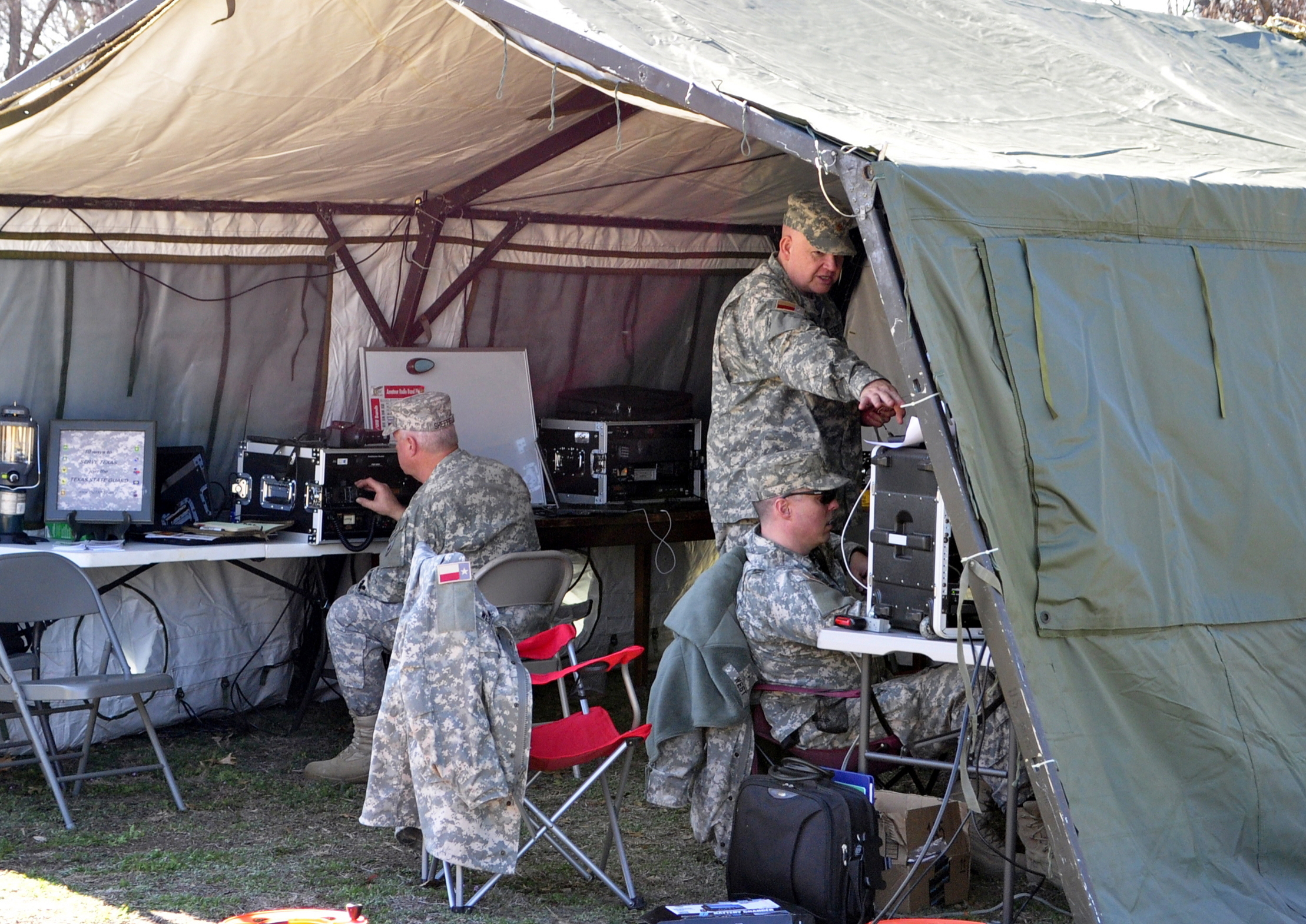
The 19th Regiment signal unit conducting a radio communications exercise.

- Operation Lone Star (Ongoing)
  - Standoff at Eagle Pass
- Hurricane Laura in 2020
- Winter Weather response - 2019
- Hurricane Marco in 2020
- George Floyd Protests
- COVID-19 response
- Hurricane Harvey in 2017
- Operation Final Rest (Ongoing)
- Operation Lone Star - Border Health Preparedness (annual mission)
- Operation Strong Safety (Ongoing)
- Operation Border Star I-VII (Ongoing)
- Observe Operation Jade Helm 15 in 2015 (see Jade Helm 15 conspiracy theories)
- Texas Memorial Day Flood (Blanco River) in 2015
- Bastrop Forest Fire in 2014
- Hurricane Alex in 2010
- Hurricane Ike in 2008
- Hurricane Gustav in 2008
- Tropical Storm Edouard in 2008
- Hurricane Dolly in 2008
- Marble Falls Flood in 2007
- Hurricane Humberto in 2007
- Hurricane Dean in 2007
- Eagle Pass Tornado in 2007
- Operation Wrangler in 2007
- Hurricane Rita in 2005
- Hurricane Katrina in 2005
- Columbia Space Shuttle - ground search for remains in 2003

== Awards ==
U.S. Armed Forces awards may be worn on the Texas State Guard uniform.
Texas Military Forces awards available to Texas State Guard members:

- Texas Medal of Valor
- Texas Purple Heart Medal
- Texas Superior Service Medal
- Texas Lone Star Distinguished Service Medal
- Texas Outstanding Service Medal
- Texas Medal of Merit (also awarded with "V" for valor)
- Texas Adjutant General's Individual Award
- Texas Humanitarian Service Ribbon
- Texas Homeland Defense Service Medal
- Texas Faithful Service Medal
- Texas State Guard Meritorious Service Ribbon
- Commanding General's Individual Award
- Texas State Guard Recruiting Ribbon
- Officer Professional Development Ribbon
- NCO Professional Development Ribbon
- Basic Training Ribbon
- Texas State Guard Physical Fitness Ribbon
- Texas State Guard Service Medal
- Texas State Guard Unit Awards:
- Texas Governor's Unit Citation
- Texas State Guard Meritorious Unit Award
- Texas State Guard Organizational Excellence Award

== Commanding Generals ==
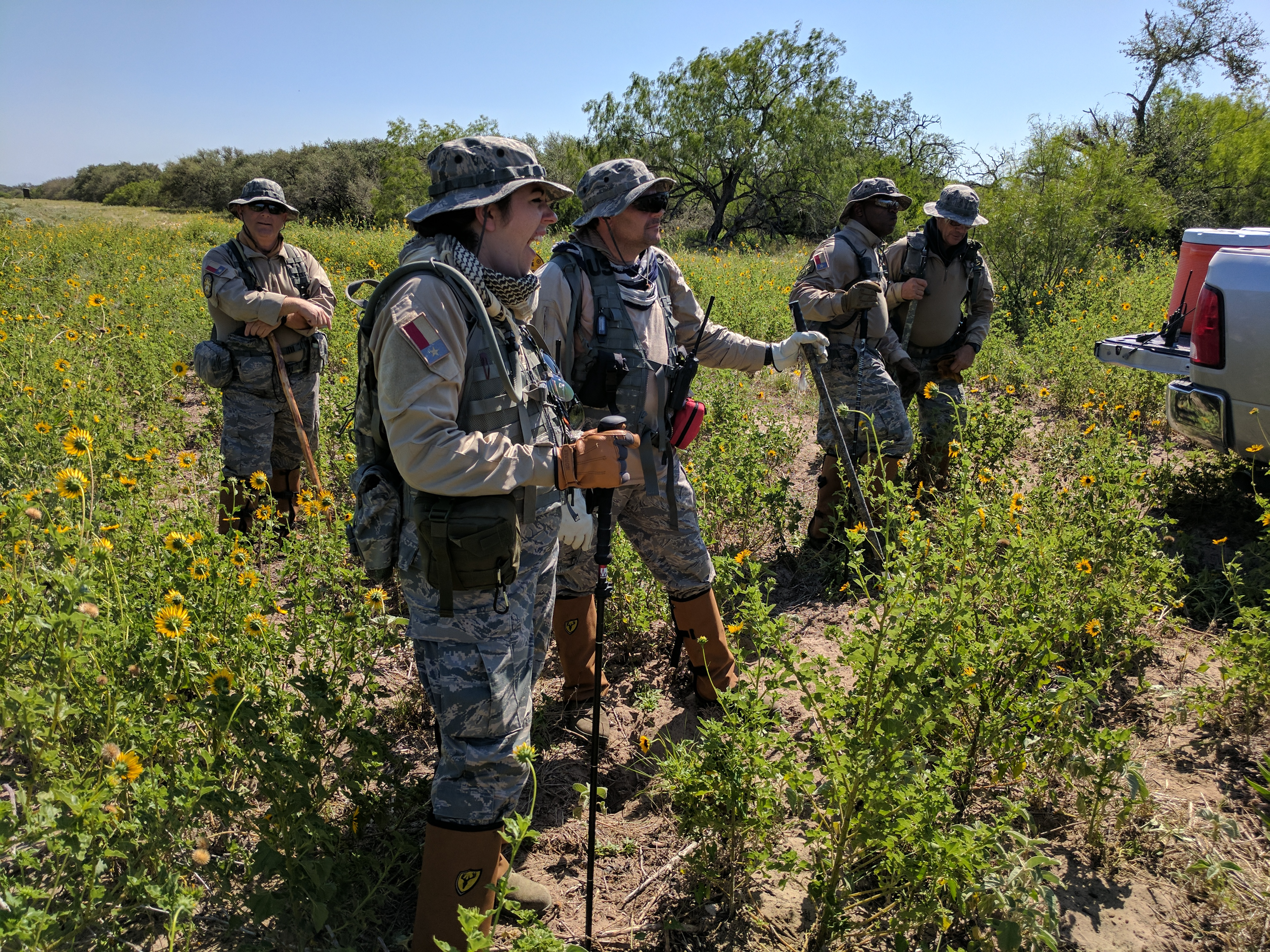
Texas State Guardsmen searching during a humanitarian mission.

1. Maj. Gen. J. Watt Page 1941–1943
2. Maj. Gen. Arthur B. Knickerbocker 1943–1947
3. Maj. Gen. Claude V. Birkhead 1947–1950
4. Maj. Gen. Raymond Phelps 1950–1953
5. Maj. Gen. Lloyd M. Bentsen Sr. 1953–1963
6. Maj. Gen. John L. Thompson Jr. 1963–1966
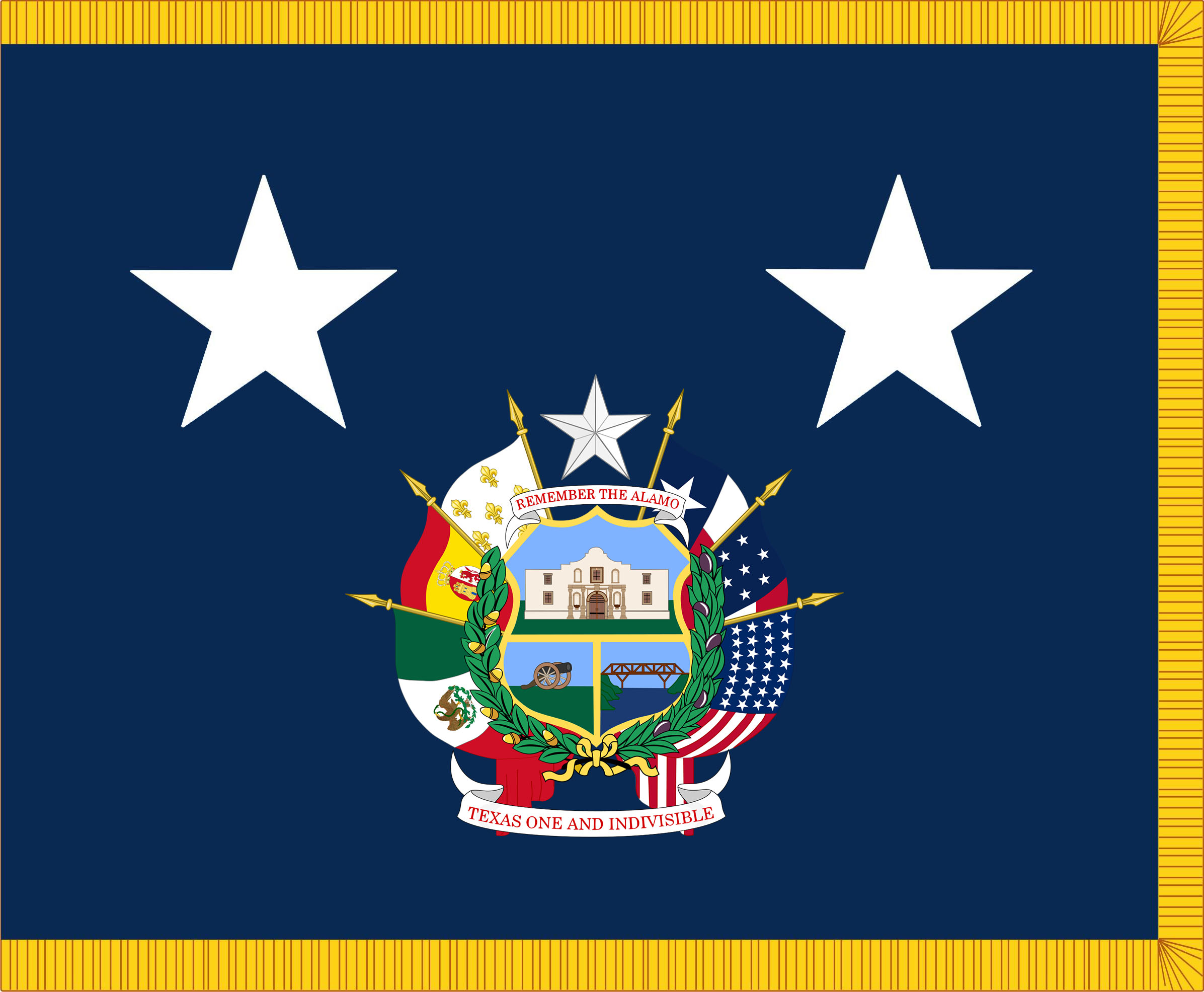
7. Flag of a Major General of the Texas State Guard
  Maj. Gen. Harley B. West 1966–1969
8. Maj. Gen. Max H. Specht 1969–1974
9. Maj. Gen. William Green 1974–1984
10. Maj. Gen. Roland Bruce Harris 1984–1987
11. Maj. Gen. James W. Robinson 1988–1990
12. Maj. Gen. Marlin E. Mote 1990–1994
13. Maj. Gen. John H. Bailey, II 1994–1997
14. Maj. Gen. Bertus L. Sisco 1997–2000
15. Maj. Gen. Richard A. Box 2000–2006
16. Maj. Gen. Christopher J. Powers 2006–2009
17. Maj. Gen. Raymond C. Peters 2009–2012
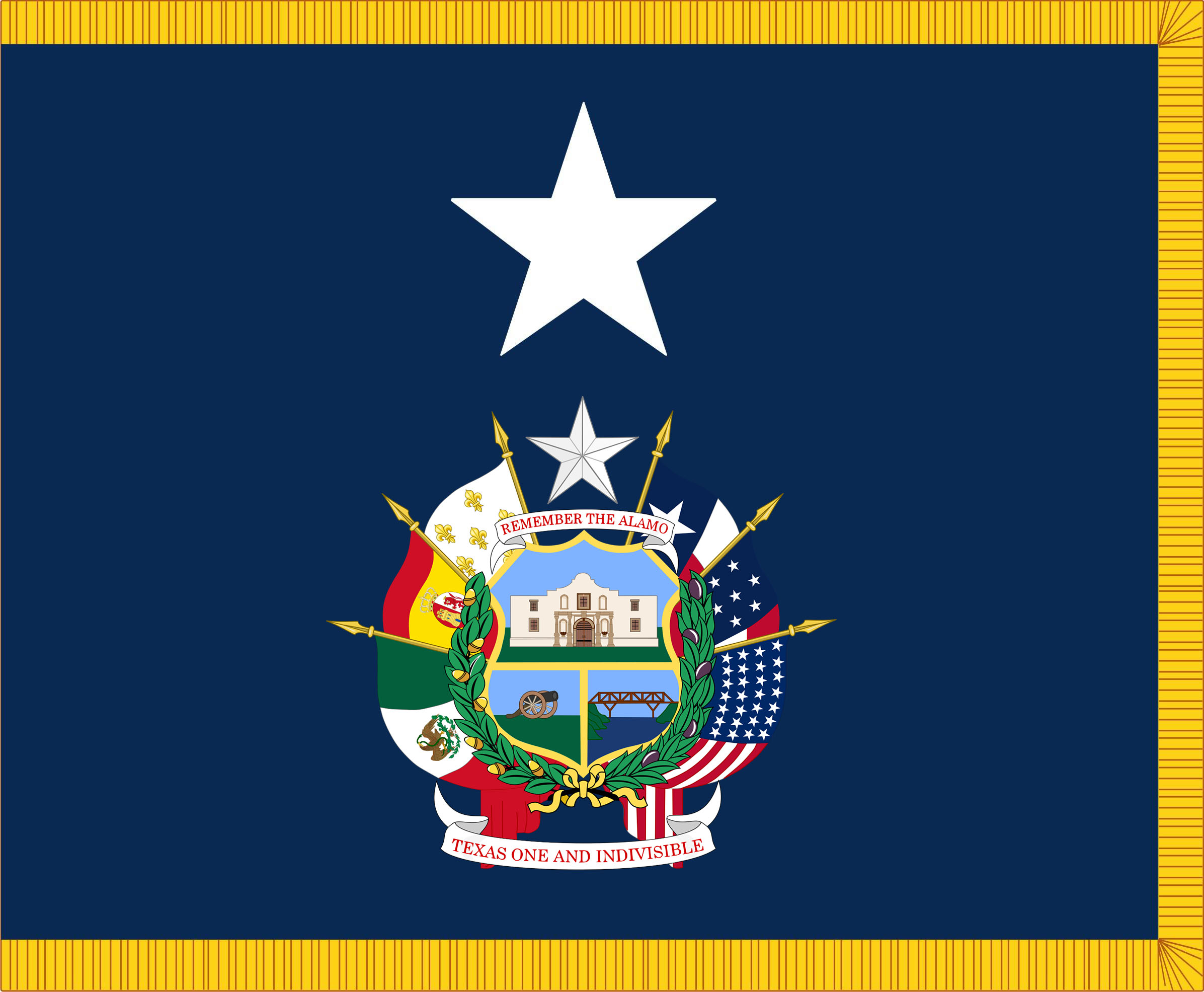
18. Flag of a Brigadier General of the Texas State Guard
  Maj. Gen. Manuel A. Rodriguez VII 2012–2014
19. Maj. Gen. Gerald R. "Jake" Betty 2014–2017
20. Maj. Gen. Robert J. "Duke" Bodisch 2017–2021
21. Maj. Gen. Anthony Woods 2021–2025
22. Maj. Gen. Roger Sheridan 2025 - present

Command Senior Enlisted Advisors

1. CSM Steven Bell 2012–2014
2. SGM Bryan Becknell 2014–2019
3. CSM Charles R Turbeville 2019–2022
4. CSM Harlan Thompson 2022–2025
5. CSM Jerry Kovar 2025-present

== In popular culture ==
The Texas State Guard was referenced in a Doonesbury comic strip in June 2015.

== See also ==
- Texas Wing Civil Air Patrol
- State Guard Association of the United States
