= John Burke (spy) =

John Burke (March 9, 1832 – January 4, 1871) was a Confederate Adjutant General of Texas and spy. He was born in Philadelphia, Pennsylvania on March 9, 1832. He was left an orphan by age 11 and eventually he made his way to Marshall, Texas. There he studied law at night and was a cobbler (shoemaker) by day. He was eventually admitted to the bar and took rank as a criminal lawyer alongside his brother-in-law, Pendleton Murrah. When the Civil War broke out, he joined the Confederacy and was briefly a member of the famous Hood's Brigade until he became a scout. He served early in the war as a scout for P. G. T. Beauregard, Joseph E. Johnston, and J. E. B. Stuart during Jackson's Valley Campaign in 1862. He rode with J. E. B. Stuart around George B. McClellan's army in 1862. Burke traveled behind Union lines as far as New York City, Philadelphia, and Washington, D.C. He used disguises, frequently the uniform of a Union officer, and would change the color of his artificial eye. He was able to provide Robert E. Lee with valuable information about Union forces and dispositions. Unfortunately, Captain John Burke never really kept a record of any field reconnaissance, but the information he gathered for the Confederacy was "said to have aided Beauregard and Johnston at Manassas." His most daring adventure came after he was apprehended in Philadelphia. He was placed under guard, in irons and handcuffs. As the train to Washington crossed a high trestle, he jumped into a river and made his way back to Lee. Fatigued by his exertions and now a colonel, Burke resigned and accepted appointment by Governor Pendleton Murrah as adjutant general of Texas, effective November 1, 1864. General Lee wrote a letter thanking him for his services. Records of the adjutant general's office were lost in the Texas State Capitol fire of 1881, and little of Burke's service in that assignment is known.

At the end of the war he joined Murrah in his flight to Mexico. After Murrah died on August 4, 1865, Burke returned to Marshall and resumed his law practice. After the war, Burke married Jennie Taylor in 1865. They had two sons and a daughter, all of whom were born at John and Jennie Taylor Burke's plantation, Taylor Hall. Col. Burke emptied his plantation house of all finery as he had to burn it down. During reconstruction, the Yankees seized the plantations of high-ranking officers. Burke knew that being lynched for taking this step was the penalty according to the martial law. No one dared to reproach this dedicated man. His most famous case at the bar was his defense of prisoners held at Jefferson, Texas in the Stockade Case in 1869. Burke died at Jefferson on January 4, 1871, and is buried there.

== Disguises and Spy Life ==
John Burke was both a scout and a spy. Those are completely different jobs, yet still similar, especially if one spy is doing them both. Scouting means to hear information, so a scout is one who would hear and find out important information about the enemy and their plans and problems. The way a scout does this is that they are supposed to learn, from others, the movements, strengths, and force of the enemy. To spy means to see. A spy is supposed to be observative and watch everything. A spy is supposed to learn by seeing. A spy like Burke enters the lines of the enemy in disguise in order to spy out the land. General Thomas L. Rosser says that John Burke "was the eyes and ears of Lee's army." If a spy like John Burke is seen in battle, he is to be seen as 'a regular prisoner of war.' Spies are often secretive by creating clever disguises in order to gather important information. During his expeditions as a scout and a spy, Burke many times went into the enemy's country in various clever disguises. Some of these disguises were being a truck farmer and pretending to be a gentleman of leisure lounging around the Capitol at Washington. John Burke also had an artificial eye. He would take out and change the color of this glass eye as a very different disguise. Lastly, because he was born in the Northern region of the United States, Burke "possessed a Northern accent that enabled him to move about among the Yankees without rousing suspicion;" thus, making him a key element in the Confederate spy ring. As a scout and spy, John Burke invaded the departments and gathered a lot of valuable information from enemies. Importantly for his career, Burke excelled as a mimic. From the most reliable people and sources, he was able to pick up important army news. Although, sometimes John Burke was not careful enough and the enemy was almost too quick for him, but every time, he outsmarted the enemy. On one expedition, John Burke was caught in Philadelphia. He was ironed and handcuffed, and death by hanging seemed to be next. But, while being taken away in a train at night, Burke remembered jumping off of bridges. Because of this memory, he jumped overboard the train and he escaped and was back at Lee's headquarters in only a few days. Back in battle, Burke was discovered again. He decided to abandon and run away from his horse and go into hiding nearby. He found an empty barn. This barn was just too empty. It had no place for Burke to hide. He decided to climb up onto the cross beams overhead, and he hid breathlessly while he watched as his pursuers entered the barn and looked almost everywhere possible that the clever spy, John Burke, could be. Finally, they gave up and left. There are many more escape stories from John Burke's spy and scout career, but there is one particularly amusing one. With the enemy close at his heels, Burke ran into a friend's house nearby. The only possibly sufficient hiding place was the wide-spreading hoopskirt of his hostess. This very personal hiding spot proved sufficient.
