= Title 32 of the United States Code =

U.S. federal statutes on the National Guard

Title 32 of the United States Code outlines the role of the United States National Guard in the United States Code. It is one of two ways the National Guard can be activated by the US Federal Government. Under Title 32, National Guard remains under control of the state but is funded by the federal government. Under Title 10, the National Guard can be commanded by the President of the United States under certain conditions.

- 32 U.S.C. ch. 1—Organization
- 32 U.S.C. ch. 3—Personnel
- 32 U.S.C. ch. 5—Training
- 32 U.S.C. ch. 7—Service, Supply, And Procurement
- 32 U.S.C. ch. 9—Homeland Defense Activities
