= Adjutant General of Texas =

Commander and chief executive officer of the Texas Military Department

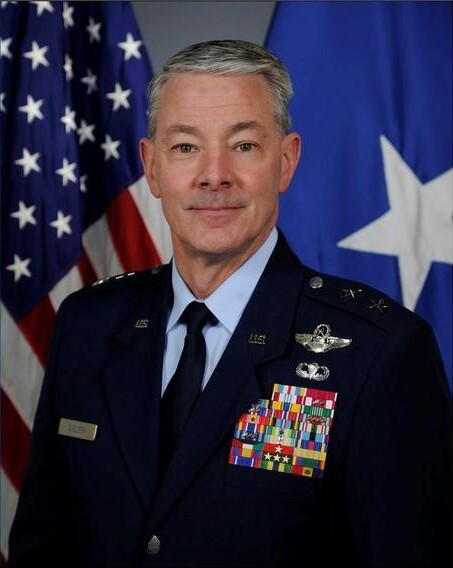
- Incumbent; Major General Thomas M. Suelzer, USAF since March 14, 2022
- Texas Military Department; Office of the Adjutant General
- Status: Commander and CEO
- Reports to: Governor of Texas
- Seat: Building Eight; Camp Mabry, Austin, Texas; 30°18′42.173″N 97°45′38.338″W
- Appointer: Governor of Texas; with Texas Senate advice and consent
- Term length: Two years
- Constituting instrument: 4 T.G.C., Sub. C., Sec. 437.003
- Formation: 5 August 1836; 190 years ago
- First holder: Albert Sidney Johnston
- Deputy: Brigadier General Monie R. Ulis, TXARNG; Brigadier General Andrew Camacho, TXANG
- Website: https://tmd.texas.gov/office-of-the-adjutant-general

The Adjutant General of Texas is the commander and chief executive officer of the Texas Military Department, the executive department of the Texas Military Forces. The adjutant general's position of authority over Texas Military Forces is second only to the commander-in-chief, the governor of Texas. This position is analogous to the United States secretary of defense. The adjutant general of Texas is appointed by the governor of Texas with the advice and consent of the Texas Senate from Texas Government Code Title 4, Subtitle C, Chapter 437.003.

The Constitution of Texas vests all military authority in the commander-in-chief, an elected position, to maintain civilian control of the military. It is impractical for the governor of Texas to operate the military themselves, so their command authority is delegated via commission to the adjutant general. The adjutant general, secretary of state, attorney general, and comptroller are generally regarded as the most important executive positions in the Government of Texas.

== History ==
Texas Military Forces were established in 1835 in concurrence with the Texas Revolution. The War Department, headed by the Secretary of War, was established by the 1st Congress of the Republic of Texas on August 5, 1836, which included the Texas militia, Texas Army, Texas Navy, Texas Rangers, and Office of the Adjutant General first held by Colonel Albert Sidney Johnston from August 5, 1836, to November 16, 1836.

When Texas joined the United States, the Texas Army and Texas Navy were integrated into the United States Armed Forces. The War Department was re-designated the Department of Texas and the Secretary of War position was abolished. The Adjutant General position was elevated to run the department, which now consisted of the Office of the Adjutant General, Texas militia, and the Texas Rangers. The department was abolished from February 4, 1856, to April 6, 1860, due a fire on October 10, 1855, that destroyed nearly all records.

The department was again abolished from January 1, 1867, to June 24, 1870, in the aftermath of Texas's failed attempt at seceding from the United States. After Texas was readmitted to the United States on March 30, 1870, the department was reestablished. It comprised the Office of the Adjutant General, Texas militia and the Texas State Police until the latter was disbanded in 1873, and replaced with a newly organized Texas Rangers, now operating as a statewide law enforcement body rather than a frontier militia force.

Following the Militia Act of 1903, the Texas militia became the Texas National Guard. During World War I, the Department of Texas was re-designated the Adjutant General Department and again maintained provincial "Home Guard" forces for defense of the state while the Texas National Guard was under federal command. By 1935, the Texas Rangers had evolved from a paramilitary force to a police force and were reorganized under the Texas Department of Public Safety. During World War II, the United States Congress amended the National Defense Act of 1916 permanently authorizing the "Home Guard" defense forces as the Texas State Guard. The Adjutant General Department was colloquially referred to as the "Texas Military" from 2006 to 2015. On October 28, 2015, the Adjutant General Department was officially rebranded as the Texas Military Department.

== Powers and functions ==
=== Office of the Adjutant General ===
The Office of the Adjutant General (OAG) is the general and their deputy's (mainly) civilian staff.

OAG is the principal staff element of the Adjutant General in the exercise of policy development, planning, resource management, fiscal and program evaluation and oversight, and interface and exchange with other Texas Government departments and agencies, foreign governments, and international organizations, through formal and informal processes. OAG also performs oversight and management of Texas Military Forces.

=== Awards and decorations ===
- The Texas Adjutant General's Individual Award, is the eighth highest military decoration that may be awarded to a service member of the Texas Military Forces.
- The Texas Adjutant General's Certificate of Commendation
- The Texas Adjutant General's Certificate of Appreciation

== List of adjutants general ==
*Military ranks at time of office:

Number	Portrait	Adjutant General	Took office	Left office	Time in office	Commander-in-Chief serving under	Ref
-		Colonel John Austin Wharton	December 9, 1835	July 5, 1836	5 months	Major General Sam Houston	
1		Colonel Albert Sidney Johnston	August 5, 1836	November 16, 1836	3 months	Governor James Robinson, President David Burnet	
2		Colonel Edwin Morehouse	December 22, 1836			President Sam Houston	
3		Colonel Hugh McLeod	October 24, 1837	January 18, 1841	3 years, 2 months	President Sam Houston, President Mirabeau Lamar, President Sam Houston	
		(Acting) Colonel James Davis	May 3, 1842	July 31, 1842	2 months	President Sam Houston	
4		Colonel William Gordon Cooke	January 16, 1843	April 27, 1846	3 years, 3 months	President Sam Houston, President Anson James, Governor James P. Henderson	
		(Acting) Colonel Duncan Campbell Ogden	1846			Governor James P. Henderson	
5		Colonel Charles L. Mann	December 24, 1847	March 4, 1848	2 months	Governor James P. Henderson	
6		Colonel John Drayton Pitts	March 4, 1848			Governor George Wood, Governor Peter Bell	
7		Major James Shackleford Gillett	November 24, 1851	February 4, 1856	4 years, 2 months	Governor Peter Bell, Governor James W. Henderson, Governor Elisha Pease	
		Office abolished due to October 10, 1855, fire	February 4, 1856	April 6, 1860	4 years, 2 months		
8		Civilian Anthony Banning Norton	April 6, 1860			Governor Sam Houston	
9		Lieutenant Colonel William Byrd	March 25, 1861			Governor Edward Clark	
10		Colonel Jeremiah Yellot Dashiell	November 11, 1861			Governor Francis Lubbock	
11		Lieutenant Colonel David Browning Culberson	November 17, 1863	November 1864	1 year	Governor Francis Lubbock	
12		Colonel John Burke	November 1, 1864	May 13, 1865	6 months	Governor Pendleton Murrah	
13		Major Davis R. Gurley	May 13, 1865	January 1, 1867	1 year, 7 months	Governor James Throckmorton, Governor Elisha Pease	
		Office abolished due to Reconstruction	January 1, 1867	June 24, 1870		Military Governor Andrew Hamilton	
14		Colonel James Davidson	June 24, 1870	November 15, 1872		Governor Edmund Davis	
15		Civilian Frank L. Britton	November 14, 1872	January 20, 1874		Governor Edmund Davis, Governor Richard Coke	
16		Brigadier General William S. Steele	January 20, 1874	January 25, 1879		Governor Richard Coke, Governor Richard Hubbard	
17		Major John B. Jones	January 25, 1879	July 19, 1881		Governor Oran Roberts	
18		Colonel Wilburn Hill King	July 25, 1881	January 23, 1891		Governor Oran Roberts, Governor John Ireland Governor Lawrence Ross	
19		Colonel Woodford Haywood Mabry	January 23, 1891	May 5, 1898		Governor Jim Hogg, Governor Charles Culberson	
20		Brigadier General Alfred Prior Wozencraft	May 5, 1898	January 17, 1899		Governor Charles Culberson	
21		Major Thomas Scurry	January 17, 1899	June 1, 1903		Governor Joseph Sayers	
22		Brigadier General John Augustus Hulen	June 1, 1903	January 23, 1907		Governor Samuel Lanham	
23		Brigadier General James Oscar Newton	January 23, 1907	December 15, 1910		Governor Thomas Campbell	
24		Brigadier General Robert H. Beckham	December 15, 1910	January 23, 1911		Governor Oscar Colquitt	
25		Brigadier General Henry Hutchings	January 23, 1911	September 29, 1917		Governor Oscar Colquitt, Governor James Ferguson, Governor William Hobby	
26		Major James A. Harley	September 29, 1917	September 30, 1919		Governor William Hobby	
27		Wesley D. Cope	October 1, 1919	January 20, 1921		Governor William Hobby	
28		Major General Thomas Dickson Barton	January 20, 1921	January 23, 1925		Governor Pat Neff	
29		First Lieutenant William Mark McGee	January 24, 1925	December 5, 1925		Governor Miriam Ferguson	
30		Colonel Dallas J. Matthews	December 5, 1925	January 20, 1927		Governor Miriam Ferguson	
31		Brigadier General Robert L. Robertson	January 20, 1927	January 22, 1931		Governor Dan Moody	
32		Captain William Warren Sterling	January 22, 1931	January 15, 1933		Governor Ross Sterling	
33		Major General Henry Hutchings	January 18, 1933	January 15, 1935		Governor Miriam Ferguson	
34		Colonel Carl Eugene Nesbitt	January 15, 1935	January 25, 1939		Governor James V. Allred	
35		Brigadier General Harry Knox Jr	January 26, 1939	December 31, 1939		Governor Wilbert O'Daniel	
36		Brigadier General John Watt Page Sr	January 1, 1940	March 4, 1943		Governor Wilbert O'Daniel, Governor Coke Stevenson	
37		Major General Arthur Balfour Knickerbocker	March 4, 1943	May 7, 1947		Governor Coke Stevenson	
38		Major General Kearie Lee Berry	May 7, 1947	July 1, 1961		Governor Beauford Jester, Governor Allan Shivers, Governor Price Daniel	
39		Major General James Edward Taylor	July 1, 1961	January 1, 1962		Governor Price Daniel	
40		Major General Thomas Sams Bishop	January 1, 1962	March 13, 1969		Governor John Connally	
41		Major General Ross Ayers	March 13, 1969	March 1, 1973		Governor Preston Smith	
42		Major General Thomas Sams Bishop	March 1, 1973	January 17, 1979		Governor Dolph Briscoe	
43		Major General Willie Lee Scott	January 17, 1979	February 21, 1985		Governor Bill Clements, Governor Mark White	
44		Major General James Thomas Dennis	February 21, 1985	April 24, 1989		Governor Mark White, Governor Bill Clements	
45		Major General William C. Wilson	April 24, 1989	January 7, 1993		Governor Bill Clements, Governor Ann Richards	
46		Major General Sam C. Turk	January 7, 1993	November 16, 1995		Governor Ann Richards, Governor George W. Bush	
47		Major General Daniel James III	November 16, 1995	August 9, 2002		Governor George W. Bush, Governor Rick Perry	
48		Major General Wayne D. Marty	August 9, 2002	June 12, 2005		Governor Rick Perry	
49		Major General Charles G. Rodriguez	June 12, 2005	March 2, 2009		Governor Rick Perry	
50		Major General Jose S. Mayorga Jr.	March 2, 2009	February 16, 2011		Governor Rick Perry	
51		Major General John Frederick Nichols	February 16, 2011	December 31, 2018		Governor Rick Perry, Governor Greg Abbott	
52		Major General Tracy R. Norris	January 1, 2019	March 1, 2022		Governor Greg Abbott	
53		Major General Thomas Suelzer	March 14, 2022	Present		Governor Greg Abbott	

== See also ==
- Texas Military Forces
- Texas Military Department
- List of conflicts involving the Texas Military
- Awards and decorations of the Texas Military
- United States Secretary of Defense
