= Awards and decorations of the Texas government =

Awards and decorations of the Texas government are bestowed by various agencies of the Texas government to citizens, employees, or service members for acts of accomplishment, meritorious service, eminence in a field, or a specific heroic act.

In order of precedence, some civil awards may be authorized for wear on Texas military uniforms after awards and decorations of the Texas Military Forces.

The following is a list of awards currently issued by the Texas government:

== Office of the Governor of Texas ==
- Yellow Rose of Texas Award
- Admiral in the Texas Navy Commission
- Texas Women's Hall of Fame

=== Committee on People with Disabilities ===
- Lex Frieden Employment Awards:
  - Martha Arbuckle Award
  - The Governor's Trophy
- Barbara Jordan Media Award

=== Governor's Volunteer Awards ===
- Governor's Lone Star Achievement Award
- First Lady's Rising Star Award
- Partners in Education Award
- Service to Veterans Award
- Higher Education Community Impact Award – University
- Higher Education Community Impact Award – Community College
- Corporate Community Impact Award
- Community Leadership Award
- National Service "Make a Difference" Award

=== Public Safety Office ===
- Star of Texas Awards:
  - Peace Officers' Star Of Texas Award
  - Firefighters' Star Of Texas Award
  - Emergency Medical First Responders' Star Of Texas Award
  - Citizens' Star Of Texas Award
- Texas Best Awards (Crime Stopper organizations)

== Texas Department of Agriculture ==
- Family Land Heritage (FLH) program
  - A recognition program that honors families who have owned and run a continuous agricultural operation for 100 years or more.

== Texas Department of Public Safety ==
- Medal of Valor
- Adolph Thomas Distinguished Service Award
- Lifesaving Award
- Director's Award
- Texas Ranger Hall of Fame

== Texas Legislature ==
- Texas Legislative Medal of Honor
- Digital Government Best of Texas Award

== Texas Military Department ==
- Awards and decorations of the Texas Military
- Hall of Honor

== Texas Parks and Wildlife Department ==
- (Est 1996) Lone Star Land Steward Awards:
  - Leopold Conservation Award (1st)
  - Ecoregion Award (2nd)
  - Lone Star Land Steward Award (3rd)

== See also ==
- Monuments and memorials in Texas
- List of Texas Revolution monuments and memorials
- Awards and decorations of the United States government
