= List of decorations awarded by the United States National Guard =

United States Navy awards for merit

Awards and decorations of the National Guard are presented to members of the National Guard and sometimes to members of the state defense forces in addition to regular United States military decorations. Each of the state governments of the United States maintains a series of military decorations for issuance to members of the National Guard, with such awards presented under the authority of the various state adjutants general.

Active or reserve federal forces veterans who subsequently serve in the National Guard wear all federal awards first, then state awards. Those National Guard soldiers and airmen who subsequently serve in the active or reserve federal forces of the United States Army, Navy, Marine Corps, Coast Guard, or United States Air Force (i.e., as active duty or reserve members of the Army, Navy, Air Force, Marine Corps, or Coast Guard) may not continue to wear and display such decorations on a military uniform, unless such activation is under Title 32 status. Active duty regulations allow federal soldiers, airmen, sailors and Marines to accept but not to wear state awards.

Most states authorize the wear of other states' awards if a soldier or airman has earned awards from a state or territory to which they are not presently assigned. The order of precedence is typically the presently assigned state, followed by awards from the District of Columbia, then other states by their order of admission.

The following is a list of National Guard decorations, as issued by each of the fifty United States; Puerto Rico, Guam, the U.S. Virgin Islands, and the District of Columbia.

== Alabama ==
Alabama National Guard State Awards:

- Alabama Distinguished Service Medal
- Alabama Commendation Medal
- Alabama Phenix City Civil Disturbance Medal
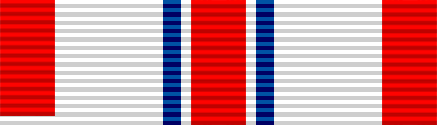
- Alabama Operation Desert Storm Ribbon
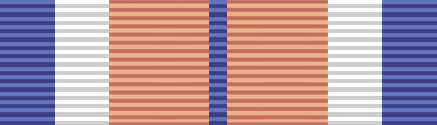
- Alabama Veterans Service Medal
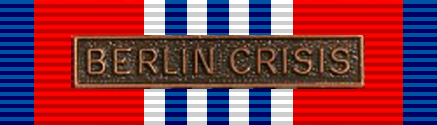
- Alabama National Emergency Service Medal
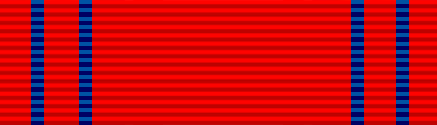
- Alabama Special Service Medal
- Alabama Faithful Service Medal
- Alabama Recruiting Ribbon
- Alabama Active Duty Basic Training Medal

== Alaska ==
Alaska National Guard State Awards:

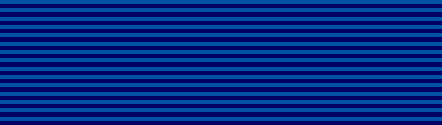
- Alaska Decoration of Honor
- Alaska Heroism Medal
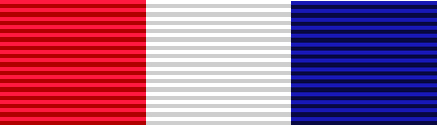
- Alaska Distinguished Service Medal
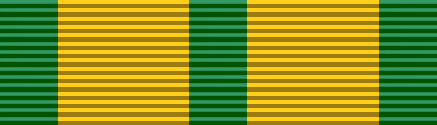
- Alaska Legion of Merit
- Alaska Meritorious Service Medal
- Alaska Air Medal
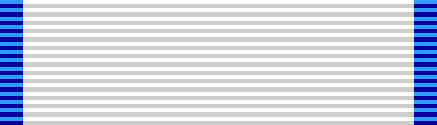
- Alaska Commendation Medal
- Alaska Achievement Medal
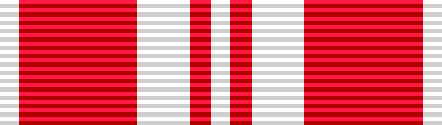
- Alaska Humanitarian Service Medal
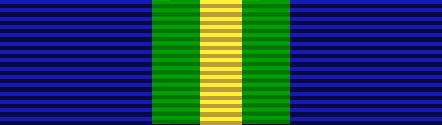
- Alaska State Service Medal
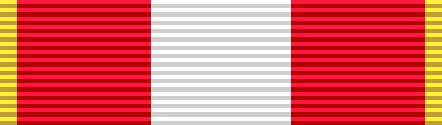
- Alaska Community Service Medal
- Alaska Domestic Emergency Ribbon
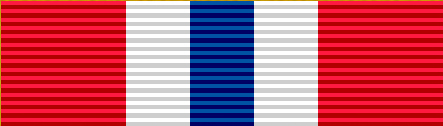
- Alaska Marksmanship Medal
- Alaska Homeland Security Medal
- Alaska Recruiting Ribbon
- Alaska State Partnership Program Ribbon
- Alaska Cold War Victory Ribbon
- Alaska Territorial Guard Medal
- Alaska Governor's Distinguished Unit Citation
- Adjutant General's Marksmanship Proficiency Award (Badge)
- Governor's Twenty Award (Tab)

== Arizona ==
Arizona National Guard State Awards:

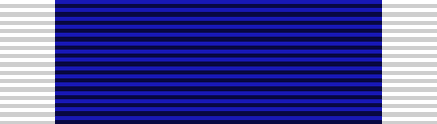
- Arizona Medal of Valor
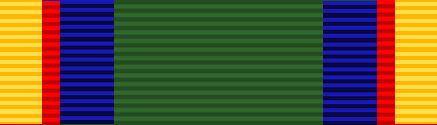
- Arizona Adjutant General's Medal
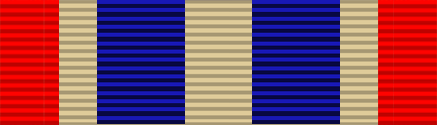
- Arizona Distinguished Service Medal
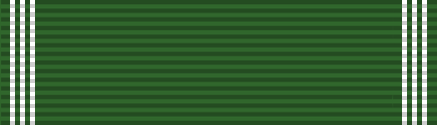
- Arizona Meritorious Service Medal
- Arizona Airman of the Year Ribbon
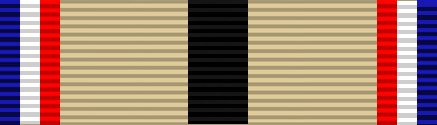
- Arizona Southwest Asia Service Support Ribbon
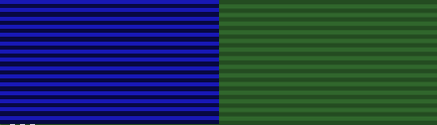
- Arizona Community Service Ribbon
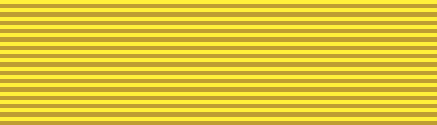
- Arizona Exceptionally Long Service Medal
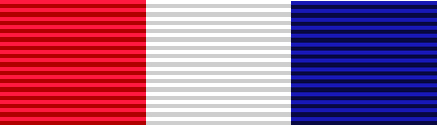
- Arizona Long Service Medal
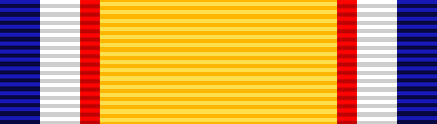
- Arizona Service Ribbon
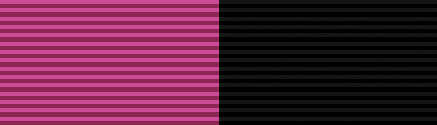
- Arizona State Active Duty Service Ribbon
- Arizona First Sergeant Ribbon
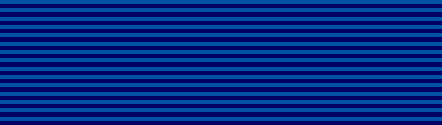
- Arizona Recruiting Ribbon
- Arizona Overseas Ribbon
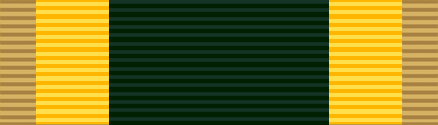
- Arizona Military Academy Ribbon (OCS)
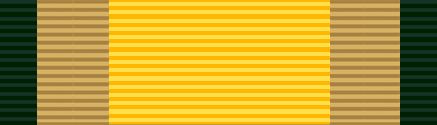
- Arizona Military Academy Ribbon (NCO) (No longer awarded)
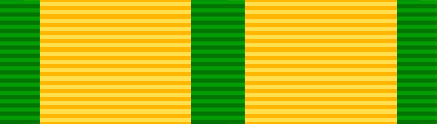
- Arizona Re-enlistment Ribbon (No longer awarded)
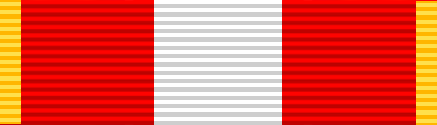
- Arizona Initial Active Duty for Training Ribbon (No longer awarded)
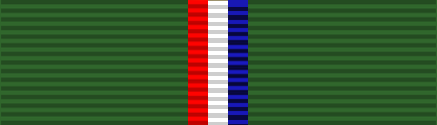
- Arizona Honor Attendance Ribbon (No Longer Awarded)

== Arkansas ==
Arkansas National Guard State Awards:

- Arkansas Medal of Honor
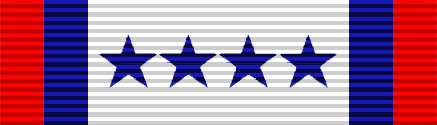
- Arkansas Military Medal
- Arkansas Distinguished Service Medal
- Arkansas Exceptional Service Medal
- Arkansas Commendation Medal
- Arkansas Federal Service Ribbon
- Arkansas Service Ribbon
- Arkansas Emergency Service Ribbon
- Arkansas Homeland Defense Ribbon
- Arkansas Recruiting Ribbon
- Arkansas Military Funeral Honors Service Ribbon (Picture Unavailable)

== California ==
California National Guard State Awards:

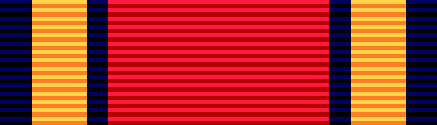
- California Medal of Valor
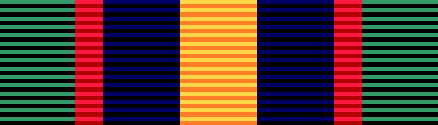
- California Military Cross
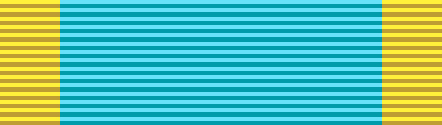
- Order of California
- CA Legion of Merit.
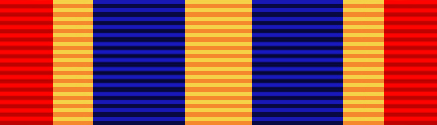
- California Medal of Merit
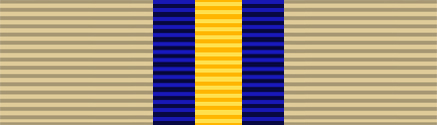
- California Commendation Medal
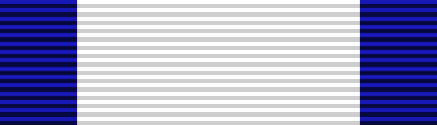
- CA Achievement Medal
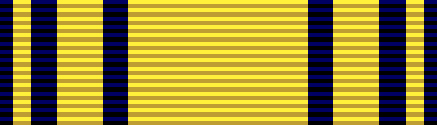
- California Good Conduct Medal
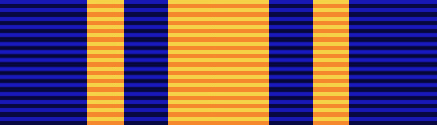
- California Service Medal
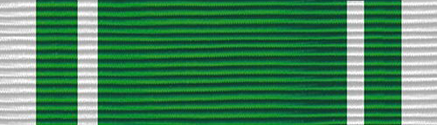
- California Enlisted Trainers Excellence Ribbon
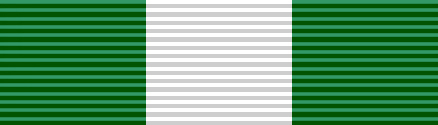
- California Enlisted Excellence Ribbon
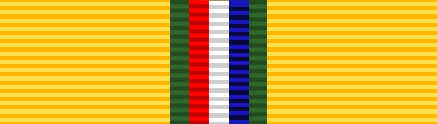
- California Recruiting Achievement Ribbon
- California National Guard Federal Service Ribbon
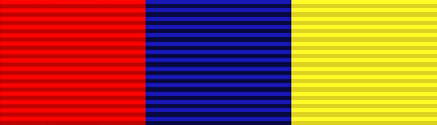
- California State Service Ribbon
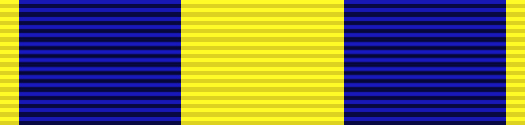
- California Senior Enlisted Leadership Ribbon
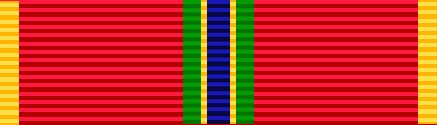
- California Counterdrug Service Ribbon
- California Drill Attendance Ribbon
- California Memorial Medal
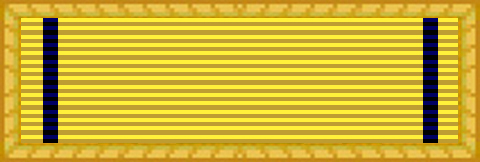
- California Governor's Outstanding Unit Citation
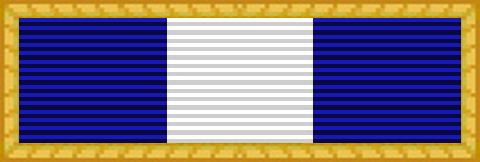
- California Commanding General's Meritorious Unit Citation

== Colorado ==
Colorado National Guard State Awards:

- Colorado Meritorious Conduct Medal
- Colorado Meritorious Service Medal
- Colorado Soldier/Airman of the Year Award
- Colorado Commendation Ribbon
- Colorado Achievement Ribbon
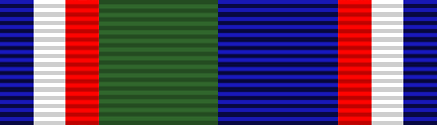
- Colorado NCO Command Tour Ribbon
- Colorado Active Service Medal
- Colorado Long Service Medal
- Colorado TAG Outstanding Unit Citation
- Colorado State Emergency Service Ribbon
- Colorado State Foreign Deployment Service Ribbon
- Colorado State Mobilization Support Ribbon
- Colorado Recruiting Ribbon

== Connecticut ==
Connecticut National Guard State Awards:

- Connecticut Medal of Valor - "The Adjutant General and two officers of field grade or above, detailed by the Adjutant General, shall act as a board to receive recommendations through military channels for the award of the medal of valor to any member of the armed forces of the state who, by reason of conspicuous gallantry, at the risk of his life, above and beyond the call of duty, while on military service, is recommended for the award of such medal of valor, and to make such awards as the board finds suitable."
- Connecticut Medal of Merit - "The Adjutant General and two officers of field grade or above, appointed by the Adjutant General, shall constitute a board of officers to receive recommendations, through military channels, for the award of the medal of merit to any member of the armed forces of the state who has distinguished himself by exceptionally meritorious conduct in performing outstanding service while a member of the armed forces of the state and to make such awards as the board finds suitable."
- Connecticut Medal of Achievement - "The Adjutant General and two officers of field grade or above, appointed by the Adjutant General, shall constitute a board of officers to receive recommendations, through military channels, for the award, within available appropriations, of the medal of achievement to any member of the armed forces of the state, as defined in section 27-2, the armed forces of the United States or the armed forces of any other state, who has distinguished himself or herself through outstanding achievement or meritorious service during the performance of any state military service. A bronze oak leaf cluster shall be issued in lieu of succeeding awards and a silver oak leaf cluster shall be worn in lieu of five bronze oak leaf clusters."
- Connecticut Veteran Wartime Service Medal - "The Commissioner of Veterans Affairs in conjunction with the Adjutant General shall award a ribbon and medal to each veteran who served in time of war, as defined in subsection (a) of section 27-103, and who either (1) was a resident of this state at the time he or she was called to active duty for such service, or (2) is domiciled in this state on the date of such award. The commissioner in conjunction with the Adjutant General shall adopt regulations, in accordance with chapter 54, setting forth the process for designing the ribbon and medal, identifying veterans who are eligible for the ribbon and medal under this section and establishing procedures for distributing the ribbon and medal to each eligible veteran. The cost of the ribbons and medals shall be paid from the funds appropriated to the military assistance account within the Military Department. Within existing budgetary resources, awards under this section may be made posthumously for veterans who died on or after November 12, 1918."
- Connecticut Long Service Medal - "The Adjutant General, upon receipt of an application, shall present the long service medal adopted by this state to each soldier or sailor who has completed ten years' faithful service in the armed forces of the state and for each additional five years' service therein the adopted clasp in exchange. In the determination of length of service, the term of service of any member of the armed forces of the state with the military or naval forces of the United States in time of war since April 21, 1898, upon proof of honorable discharge from the same, may be added to the number of years served with the armed forces of the state."
- Connecticut Mobilization Service Ribbon (Formerly the Connecticut Desert Storm Campaign Ribbon) - "The Adjutant General may issue an appropriate service ribbon to members of the National Guard or organized militia who were called to active service in the armed forces of the state or United States for at least thirty consecutive days in support of any military operation commencing after September 11, 2001, during a time of war, as defined in section 27-103. A bronze service star shall be issued in lieu of succeeding awards and a silver service star shall be worn in lieu of five bronze stars. The ribbon may be awarded posthumously."
- Connecticut Emergency Service Ribbon - "The Adjutant General, at his or her discretion, may issue an appropriate service ribbon to all members of the armed forces of the state ordered to active duty in time of emergency for upholding the law and preserving order, protecting lives and property, assisting civil authorities, providing aid and relief to civilians in disaster or similar service ordered by the Governor. A bronze oak leaf cluster shall be issued in lieu of succeeding awards and a silver oak leaf cluster shall be worn in lieu of five bronze oak leaf clusters."
- Connecticut Selected Reserve Force Medal - "The Adjutant General may issue the selected reserve force ribbon to members of the armed forces of the state who have served honorably in a selected reserve force unit designated by the United States Army for a period of at least one year from October 1, 1965, to September 3, 1969, inclusive. The award may be issued to current, retired or separated members of the armed forces of the state, and may be awarded posthumously."
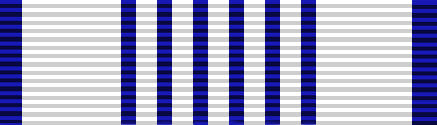
- Connecticut Outstanding Unit Award - "The Adjutant General shall issue an appropriate service ribbon to all members of the unit declared to be the outstanding company-size unit in the Connecticut National Guard in accordance with National Guard regulations, provided such members participated in at least fifty per cent of the unit's training activities during the period covered by the award. A bronze oak leaf cluster shall be issued in lieu of succeeding awards and a silver oak leaf cluster shall be worn in lieu of five bronze oak leaf clusters."
- Connecticut Soldier/Airman/NCO of the Year Ribbon - "The Adjutant General shall issue an achievement ribbon to the soldier, airman and noncommissioned officer of the year in the Connecticut National Guard."
- Connecticut Joint Recruiting Ribbon - "Except as provided in this section, the Adjutant General shall issue a military recruitment ribbon to each member of the armed forces of the state, as defined in section 27-2 of the general statutes, who has assisted in the recruitment of three persons, which persons enlist as new members of the armed forces of the state on or after July 1, 2017, complete basic training and qualify for a military occupational specialty. A bronze oak leaf cluster shall be issued in lieu of succeeding awards and a silver oak leaf cluster shall be worn in lieu of five bronze oak leaf clusters. Any member of the armed forces of the state who is assigned as a military recruiter shall not be eligible for such ribbon during such assignment."
- Connecticut Military Funeral Honors Ribbon - "The Adjutant General may issue a military funeral honors ribbon to any member of the National Guard or organized militia or other military personnel who satisfactorily performs as a member of an honor guard detail pursuant to section 27-76."

== Delaware ==
Delaware National Guard State Awards:

- Delaware Conspicuous Service Cross - Awarded for heroism, praiseworthy execution of duties over a period of time, or outstanding achievement which impacts the greater good of the State and its inhabitants.
- Delaware Distinguished Service Medal - Awarded for praiseworthy execution of duties not to the extent of the DECSC or outstanding achievement of a single or specific act or accomplishment separate and distinct from regularly assigned duties for the greater good of the Delaware National Guard.
- Delaware Medal for Military Merit - Awarded for meritorious service or outstanding achievement over a period of time not to the extent of the DECSC or DEDSM. Usually based on permanent change of assignment, completed period of service, or retirement. Awarded for every 10 years of honorable service. Recognizes a single, specific act or accomplishment separate from regularly assigned duties. To recognize proficiency in military studies, it is awarded to members who complete a military course of 80 hours or more and who are designated as "honor" or "distinguished honor" graduates.
- Delaware National Guard Medal - Awarded to any member of the DENG who has been called to federal mobilization by the President of the United States.
- Delaware National Defense Service Ribbon - Awarded to all members serving honorably in the DENG during the period 1 AUG 1990 to 31 AUG 1991, dates inclusive and 11 SEP 2001 to a date to be determined.
- Delaware Medal for Service in Aid to Civil Authority - Awarded to any person serving in the DENG who has been called upon by the Governor to assist the civil authorities in the preservation of law and order.
- Delaware Recruiting Ribbon - Awarded to individuals who have excelled in the field of recruiting in the DENG, and for those who are responsible for enlisting or appointing five individuals in the DENG.
- Delaware Physical Fitness Ribbon - Awarded to all DENG members who distinguish themselves by scoring 250-300 points on the Army Physical Fitness Test.
- Delaware National Guard Governor's Meritorious Unit Award - Awarded to those units which distinguish themselves by outstanding achievement above that of other similar units in the DENG. Unit must report an average assigned strength of over 90% per year, maintain not less than 90% paid drill attendance during the qualifying year, achieve a satisfactory rating on the General Inspection with no unsatisfactory ratings in any sub-areas, and attain the training level objective prescribed for the qualifying year.
- Delaware National Guard Unit Strength Award - Awarded to those units which achieve and maintain 95% strength during the designated year, maintain not less than 80% paid drill attendance, and a re-enlistment rate of 75% for the period.

Subsequent Awards: Gold Star - The gold star represents subsequent entitlements for the Delaware Conspicuous Service Cross and the Delaware National Guard Medal. The gold star is 3/16" in diameter and will be affixed to the ribbon of the medal. Bronze Numerals - The bronze numeral represents subsequent entitlements of the Delaware Distinguished Service Medal, Delaware Medal for Military Merit, Delaware National Defense Service Ribbon, Delaware Medal for Service in Aid to Civil Authority, Delaware Recruiting Ribbon, and the Delaware Physical Fitness Ribbon. The bronze numeral is 3/16" in diameter and will be affixed to the ribbon of the medal.

== District of Columbia ==
District of Columbia National Guard District Awards:

- District of Columbia Distinguished Service Medal - a. The performance of an act of extraordinary heroism evidenced by voluntary action in the face of great danger above and beyond the call of duty. The deed performed must have been one of personal bravery so conspicuous as to clearly distinguish the individual about his/her comrades; or b. Rendering exceptionally meritorious service in duty of responsibility, displaying exceptional initiative, tenacity of purpose, and skill. The performance must be as such to merit recognition for service which results in conspicuous and lasting benefits to DCNG. Superior performance of normal duty will not alone justify an award of this decoration.
- District of Columbia Legion of Merit - The District of Columbia National Guard (DCNG) Legion of Merit is awarded to recognize service members who have distinguished themselves by exceptionally meritorious conduct in the performance of outstanding services and achievements in a position of great responsibility, directly impacting the mission of the DCNG.
- District of Columbia Meritorious Service Medal - a. The performance of an act of heroism is evidenced by voluntary action in the face of danger. The required gallantry, while of lesser degree than that required for the award of the DCNGDSM or DCNGLOM, must nevertheless have been performed with distinction, or; b. Meritorious achievement or meritorious service, displays marked initiative, tenacity of purpose and skill, or pursuit of work with such energy and judgment as to result in marked benefit to the DCNG, or to bring public acclaim and gratitude to the achievement or service.
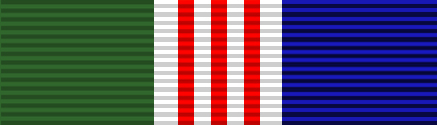
- District of Columbia Commendation Medal - Award may be presented for acts of heroism, achievement or service described above which are of a lesser than required for award of the DCMSM.
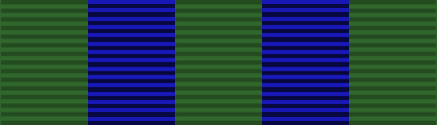
- District of Columbia Achievement Medal - Personnel who distinguish themselves by acts, achievements or service of a lesser degree than required for award of the DCNGCM.
- District of Columbia Homeland Defense Ribbon - Awarded in recognition of homeland defense service performed within the 54 states and territories for 30 or more duty days. The duty necessary to qualify for this ribbon shall be military operational duty expressly performed in defense of the District or Nation from the international or domestic threats as designated by Congress, the President, or the Secretary of War.
- District of Columbia Capital Security Support Ribbon - The DCNG Capital Security Support Ribbon (CSSR) is awarded to members of the DCNG who are called or ordered to active Federal service for a specified or indefinite period of peace time, during any crisis designated as such by Congress, the President, or the Secretary of War or in support National Special Security Events (NSSEs) and served in an honorable and faithful manner. Note: This award was previously entitled the DCNG Emergency Support Ribbon (DCNGESR) and is interchangeable with the DCNG Capital Security Support Ribbon.
- District of Columbia Presidential Inauguration Support Ribbon - a. This award is effective 1 January 2021, with no retroactive awards authorized. b. Any T32 Army or Air National Guardsman from all 54 states, territories or civilian personnel providing direct support to JTF-DC or Joint Staff during the planning/preparation phases, or execution phase the PI mission(s). c. In lieu of a ribbon, civilian personnel will be presented with the corresponding certificate.
- District of Columbia Community Service Ribbon - Awarded to service members who are called to duty to provide direct support to community activities, humanitarian efforts, and/or emergency support civil authorities in a federal status in support of an approved request for assistance.
- District of Columbia Ceremonial/Drill Team/Color Guard Ribbon - a. Retroactive to January 1972, anyone who has served with the Ceremonial/Drill Team/Color Guard team is authorized to wear the basic ribbon. b. Effective 1 October 1995 must complete a one-year tour with the team to be authorized award of the basic ribbon.
- District of Columbia Recruiting and Retention Ribbon - Awarded to members of the DCNG who refer three prospective enlistees who subsequently enlist in the DCNG during a fiscal year. Additionally, Commanders, First Sergeants, and unit retention NCOs whose assigned unit achieves an 85 percent retention rate during the fiscal year period are eligible.
- District of Columbia Commanding General's Outstanding Unit Award - Awarded to a unit of the DCNG or in support of the DCNG who actively participate in selected Federal or District missions that support and promote good civic or community relations. Members must have been assigned to the DCNG unit or unit in support of the DCNG on the date of mission to be eligible for this award.
- District of Columbia NCO Commendation Ribbon (Deactivated, no longer authorized) - Awarded for leadership, devotion to duty, personal development, and commendable achievement or service have rendered a distinct service to the unit, and which clearly sets the performance of individual above that of his/her peers. Normal performance of duty, expected of an individual at the grade and assignment, is not an adequate basis for approval of this award.
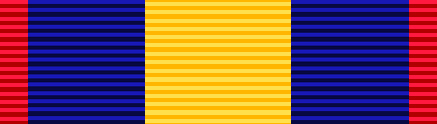
- District of Columbia Long and Faithful Service Ribbon (Deactivated, no longer authorized) - Awarded for honorable and faithful active service in the DCNG for a period of three years, not necessarily consecutive.
- District of Columbia Recognition Ribbon (Deactivated, no longer authorized) - The purpose of this ribbon is to allow the wear of a unique ribbon to recognize the outstanding award recipients for the categories of: DCNG Outstanding Senior NCO of the Year (Army/Air), DCNG Outstanding NCO of the Year (Army/Air), DCARNG Outstanding Soldier of the Year, DCANG Outstanding Airman of the Year
- District of Columbia Enlisted Excellence Ribbon (Deactivated, no longer authorized) - Awarded at the end of each fiscal year for the following: a. Attending 100 percent of the units training assemblies and Annual Training for the fiscal year b. Completing appropriate skill level/upgrade training requirement for the grade held c. Completing Professional Military Education requirements for the grade held d. Qualifying as required on assigned weapons e. Meeting physical fitness standards as prescribed by the ANG Physical Fitness Program Maintaining Appearance in accordance with prescribed regulations
- District of Columbia Special Award Ribbon (Deactivated, no longer authorized) - The purpose of this ribbon is to enhance the awards listed below by allowing the wear of a unique ribbon to recognize the award recipients in the following categories: Major General Cunningham C. Bryant Leadership Award, MSG Adolph R. Scagliarini Outstanding Band-member Award, Howard Kacy Flying Safety Award, Chief Master Sergeant James P. Harris Award, J. Leo Lynch Outstanding 1SG Award, Tuskegee Airmen Award, Brigadier General William R. McCall Flying Safety Award, Colonel Louis R. Williams Outstanding Personnel Award, Joseph Goldstein Aerial Gunnery Award, DC Guard Military Family of the Year, Military Volunteer of the Year.
- District of Columbia Attendance Ribbon (Deactivated, no longer authorized)

== Florida ==
Florida National Guard State Awards:

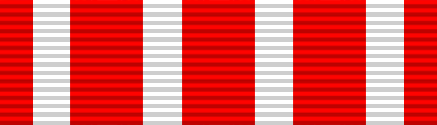
- Florida Cross
- Florida Distinguished Service Medal
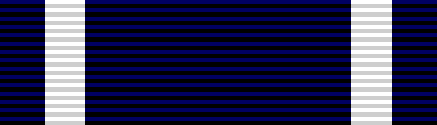
- Florida Service Medal
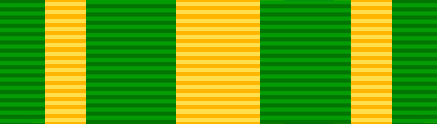
- Florida Commendation Medal
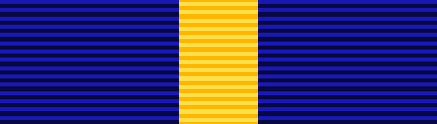
- Florida Meritorious Service Ribbon
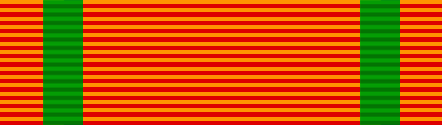
- Florida Service Ribbon
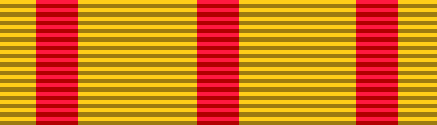
- Florida State Active Duty Ribbon
- Florida Recruiting Ribbon
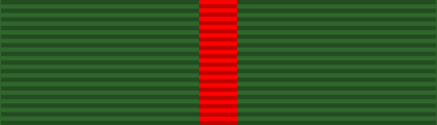
- Florida Retention Ribbon
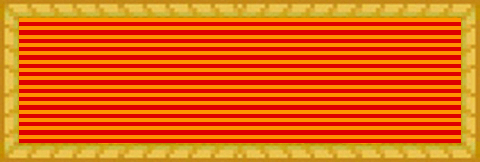
- Florida Governor's Meritorious Unit Citation
- Florida Counterdrug Ribbon

== Georgia ==
Georgia National Guard State Awards:

- Georgia Distinctive Service Medal
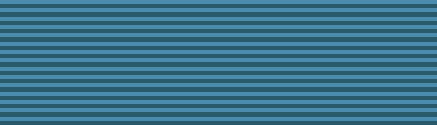
- Georgia Oglethorpe Distinguished Service Medal
- Georgia Medal for Valor
- Georgia Injury Medal (approved but not issued)
- Georgia Superior Service Medal (approved but not issued)
- Georgia Meritorious Service Medal
- Georgia DoD Commendation Medal (approved but not issued)
- Georgia Commendation Medal
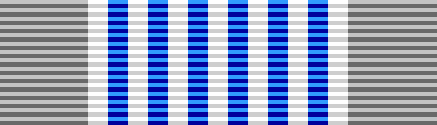
- Georgia Distinguished Foreign Service Medal
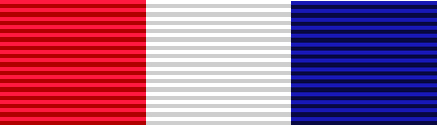
- Georgia Selected Reserve Force Ribbon
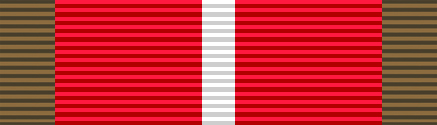
- Georgia Special Operations Ribbon
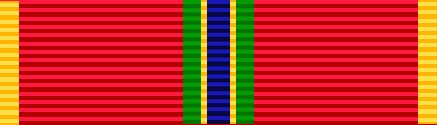
- Georgia Olympic Ribbon
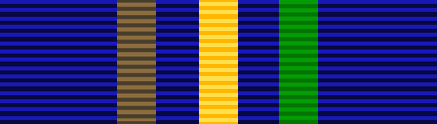
- Georgia Humanitarian Service Ribbon
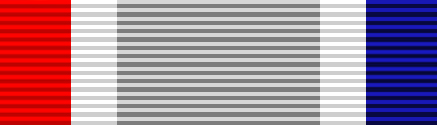
- Georgia Service Medal
- Georgia Active Duty Ribbon
- Georgia Counter Narcotics/Drug Support Service Ribbon
- Georgia Recruiting
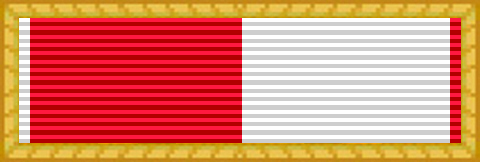
- Georgia Distinguished Unit Ribbon

== Guam ==
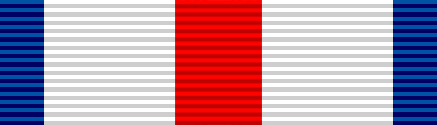
- Guam Cross of Valor
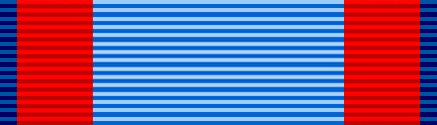
- Distinguished Service Medal of Guam
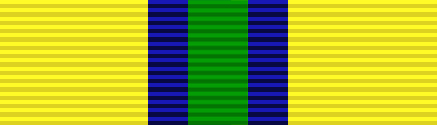
- Guam Commendation Medal
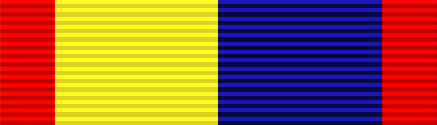
- Organizational Medal
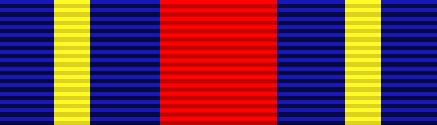
- Faithful Service Medal of Guam
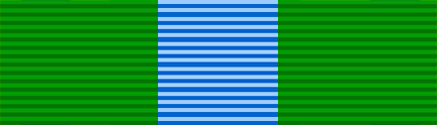
- Recruiting bar
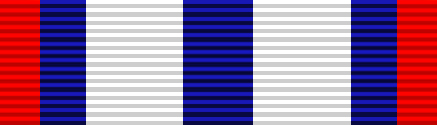
- Counter Drug Service
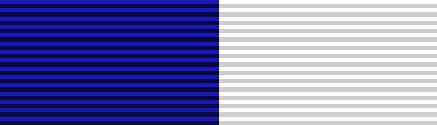
- Operation Desert Storm Meritorious Service Medal

== Hawaii ==
Hawaii National Guard State Awards:

- Hawaii Medal of Honor
- Hawaii Medal for Valor
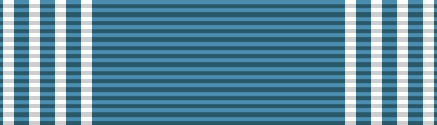
- Hawaii Distinguished Service Order
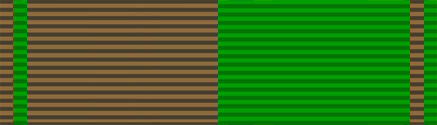
- Hawaii Medal for Merit
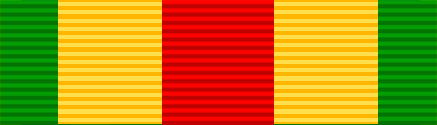
- Hawaii Commendation Medal
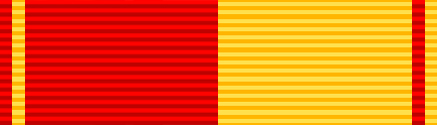
- Hawaii Service Medal (type 2)
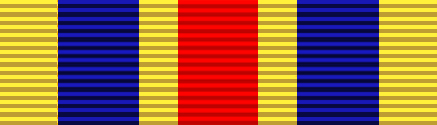
- Hawaii State Active Duty Ribbon
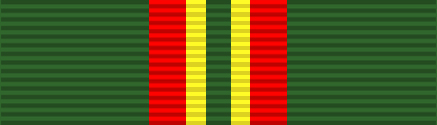
- Hawaii 1968 Federal Service Ribbon
- Hawaii Active Duty Basic Training Ribbon
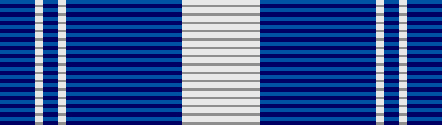
- Hawaii Hurricane Iniki Ribbon
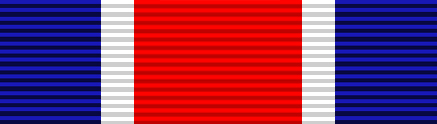
- Hawaii Operation Kokua Ribbon
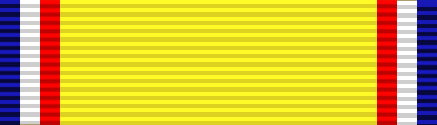
- Hawaii Recruiting Ribbon

== Idaho ==
Idaho National Guard State Awards:

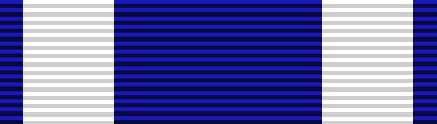
- Idaho Cross
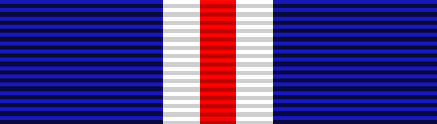
- Idaho Distinguished Service Medal
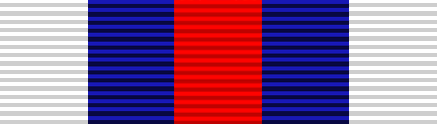
- Idaho Meritorious Service Medal
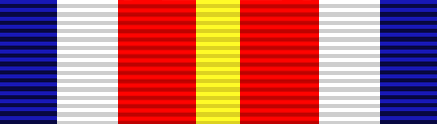
- Idaho Emergency Service Ribbon
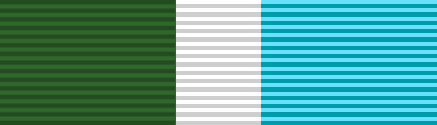
- Idaho Army National Guard Recruiting Ribbon
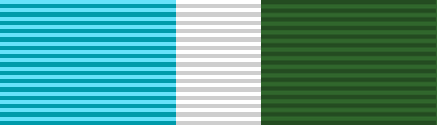
- Idaho Air National Guard Recruiting Ribbon
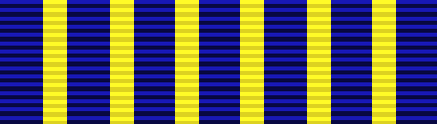
- Idaho Reenlistment Ribbon
- Idaho State Service Ribbon
- Idaho Basic Training Ribbon
- Idaho Governor's Outstanding Unit Citation
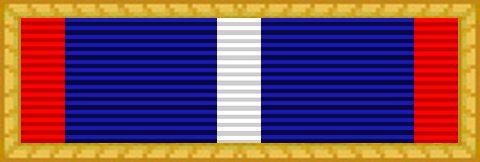
- Idaho Adjutant General's Excellence Award

== Illinois ==
Awards and decorations of the Illinois National Guard:

- Illinois Military Medal of Valor
- Illinois Military Distinguished Service Medal
- Illinois Military Medal of Merit
- Illinois Military Long and Honorable Service Medal
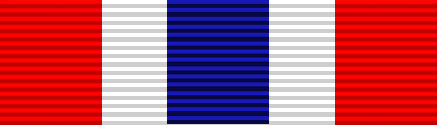
- Illinois Recruiting Ribbon
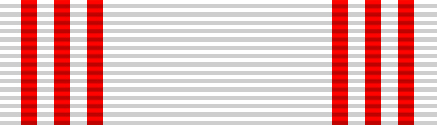
- Illinois Military Attendance Ribbon
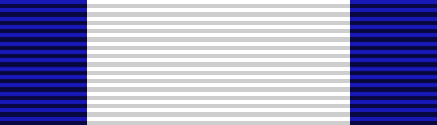
- Illinois State Active Duty Service Ribbon
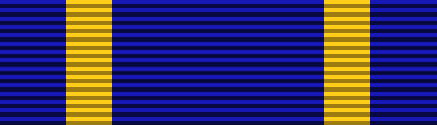
- Lincoln Medal Of Freedom
- Illinois First Sergeant Ribbon

== Indiana ==
Indiana National Guard State Awards:

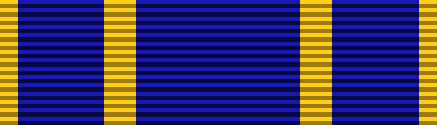
- Indiana Distinguished Service Cross
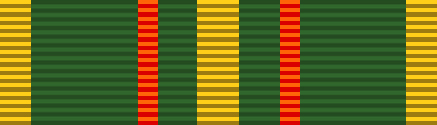
- Indiana Distinguished Service Medal
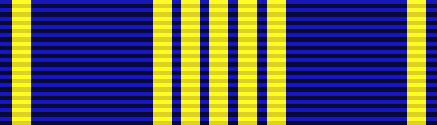
- Indiana Commendation Medal
- Indiana Operation Desert Shield/Storm Service Medal
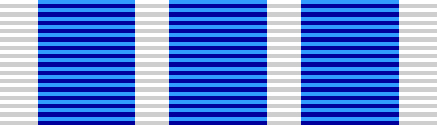
- Indiana Korean Service Medal
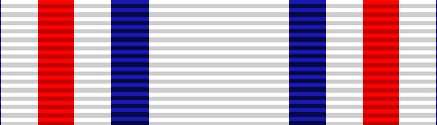
- Indiana Homeland Defense Ribbon
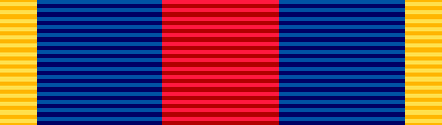
- Indiana Emergency Service Ribbon
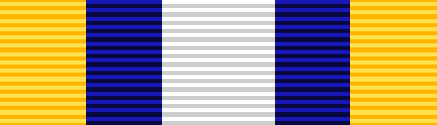
- Indiana Overseas Service Ribbon
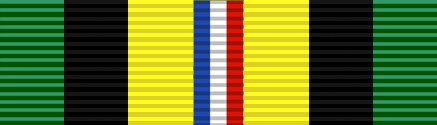
- Indiana OCONUS Service Ribbon
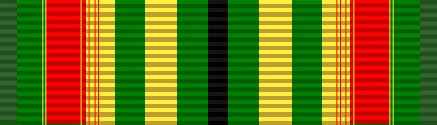
- Indiana Long Service Medal
- Indiana Recruiting Ribbon
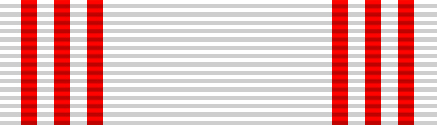
- Indiana Retention Ribbon
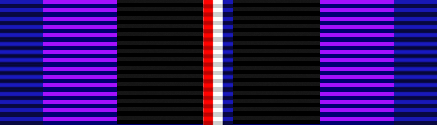
- Indiana Funeral Honors Ribbon
- No Ribbon Indiana First Sergeant Ribbon
- No Ribbon Indiana Military Voluntary Emblem

== Iowa ==
Iowa National Guard State Awards:

- Iowa Medal of Valor
- Iowa Distinguished Service Medal
- Iowa Medal of Merit
- Iowa Meritorious Service Medal
- Iowa Commendation Medal
- Iowa State Service Ribbon
- Iowa Humanitarian Service Ribbon
- Iowa Leadership Ribbon
- Iowa Active Duty Training Ribbon
- Iowa Recruiting Ribbon
- Iowa Selected Reserve Force Ribbon
- Iowa CFP/FSB Ribbon
- Iowa Outstanding Unit Award

== Kansas ==
Kansas National Guard State Awards:

- Kansas Medal of Excellence
- Kansas Distinguished Service Medal
- Kansas Governor's Medal
- Kansas Patriot Medal
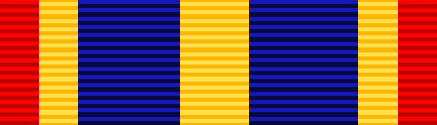
- Kansas Meritorious Service Medal
- Kansas Commendation Ribbon
- Kansas National Guard Achievement Ribbon
- Kansas Outstanding Guardsman Ribbon (ARNG)
- Kansas Outstanding Guardsman Ribbon (ANG)
- Kansas State Emergency Service Ribbon (ARNG)
- Kansas State Emergency Service Ribbon (ANG)
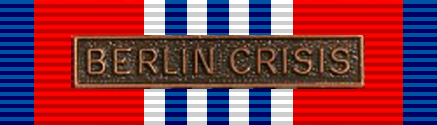
- Kansas Homeland Defense Ribbon (ARNG) (correct order of precedence)
- Kansas Counter-drug Service Ribbon
- Kansas First Sergeant Ribbon
- Kansas Recruiting Ribbon
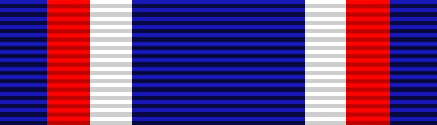
- Kansas Service Medal

== Kentucky ==
Kentucky National Guard Commonwealth Awards:

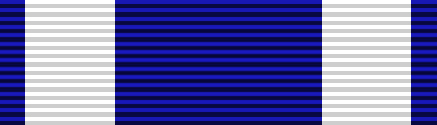
- Kentucky Medal for Valor
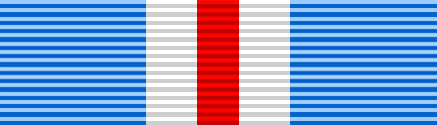
- Kentucky Distinguished Service Medal
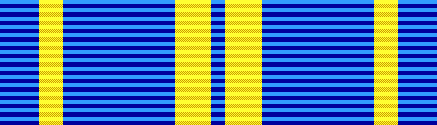
- Kentucky Merit Ribbon
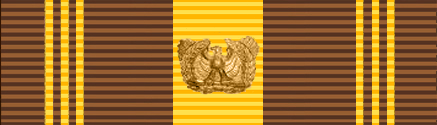
- Kentucky Army National Guard Warrant Officer of the Year
- Kentucky Outstanding Airman/Soldier Ribbon
- Kentucky Commendation Ribbon
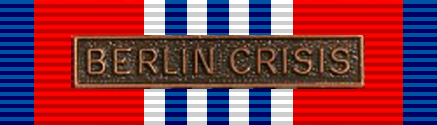
- Kentucky Berlin Crisis Service Ribbon
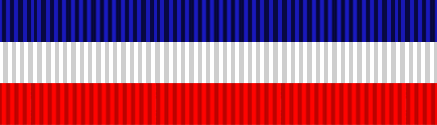
- Kentucky National Guard Recruiting Award
- Kentucky Faithful Service Ribbon (20 years)
- Kentucky State Active Duty Ribbon
- Kentucky National Guard ROTC Achievement Medal
- Kentucky National Guard Thirty Year Ribbon
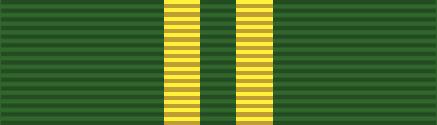
- Kentucky Counterdrug Ribbon

== Louisiana ==
Louisiana National Guard State Awards:

- Louisiana Medal of Honor
- Louisiana Distinguished Service Cross
- Louisiana Distinguished Service Medal
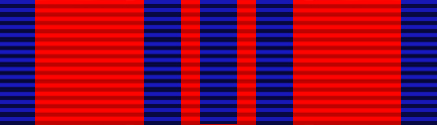
- Louisiana Legion of Merit
- Louisiana Cross of Merit
- Louisiana Commendation Medal
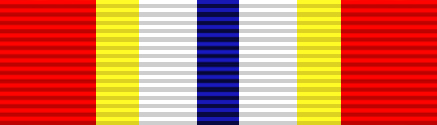
- Louisiana Achievement Ribbon
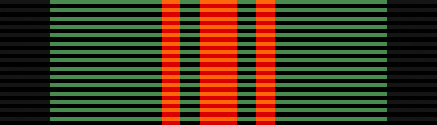
- Louisiana Recruiting Ribbon
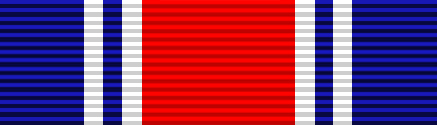
- Louisiana Retention Ribbon
- Louisiana Distinguished Civilian Service Medal
- Louisiana War Cross
- Louisiana Cold War Victory Medal
- Louisiana Emergency Service Medal
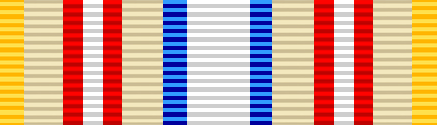
- Louisiana Counterdrug Service Ribbon
- Louisiana General Excellence Medal
- Louisiana Longevity Award
- Louisiana F.E. Herbert Meritorious Unit Commendation (Right Side)

== Maine ==
Maine National Guard State Awards:

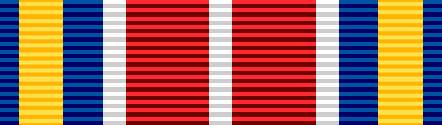
- Maine Distinguished Service Award (Discontinued)
- Maine Meritorious Service Award (Discontinued)
- Maine Commendation Award (Discontinued)
- Maine Adjutant General Award
- Maine Achievement Award
- Maine Commander's Award
- Maine Army National Guard Sergeant Major/NCO/Soldier of the Year Award
- Maine Outstanding Airman of the Year Award
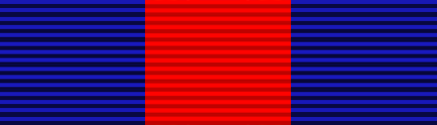
- Maine Recruiting Award
- Maine Physical Fitness Award
- Maine Good Conduct Award (Discontinued)
- Maine Basic Training Award (Discontinued)
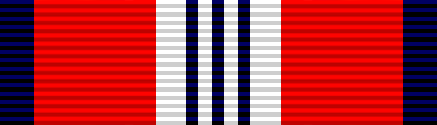
- Maine National Emergency Service Award
- Maine State Emergency Service Award (Discontinued)
- Maine Honorable Service Award
- Maine Ice Guard 98 (no longer awarded)

== Maryland ==
Maryland National Guard State Awards:

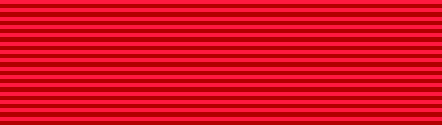
- State of Maryland Distinguished Service Cross
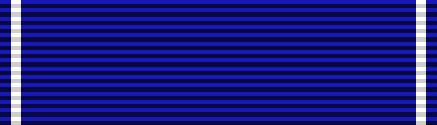
- State of Maryland Meritorious Service Medal
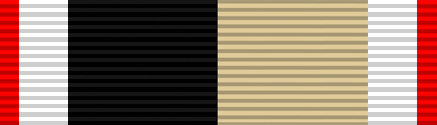
- State of Maryland Commendation Medal
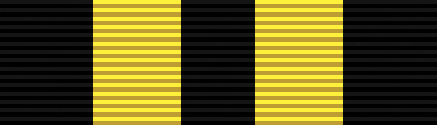
- Maryland Outstanding Unit Ribbon
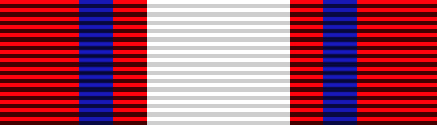
- Maryland National Guard Outstanding Soldier/Airman/First Sergeant of the Year Ribbon
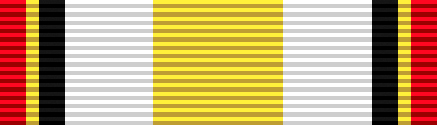
- Maryland National Guard Recruiting Medal
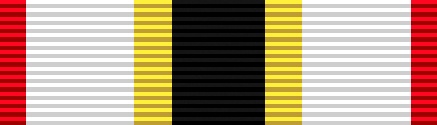
- Maryland National Guard Overseas Service Ribbon
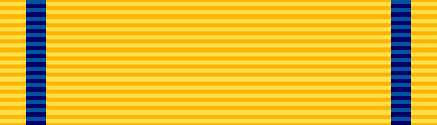
- Maryland National Guard State Service Medal
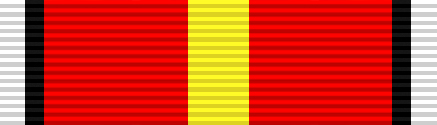
- Maryland National Guard State Active Duty Medal
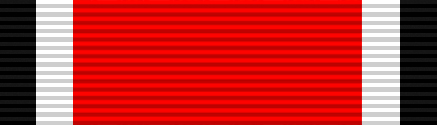
- Maryland National Guard Meritorious Civilian Service Medal
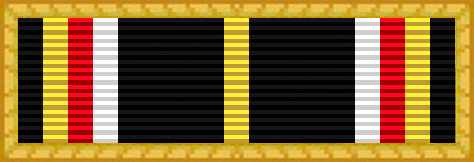
- Adjutant General's Special Recognition Ribbon

Obsolete

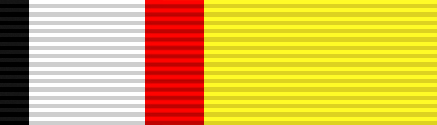
- Maryland Medal for Valor
- Maryland Air National Guard First Sergeant Ribbon
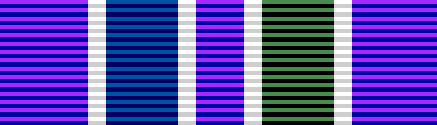
- Maryland National Guard Counterdrug Ribbon
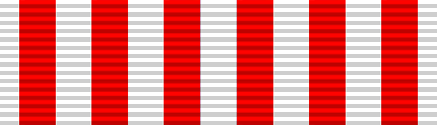
- Maryland World War I Service Medal
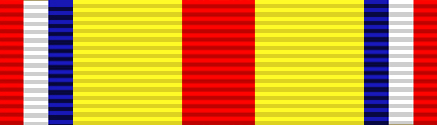
- Maryland Selected Reserve Force Medal

== Massachusetts ==
Massachusetts National Guard Commonwealth Awards:

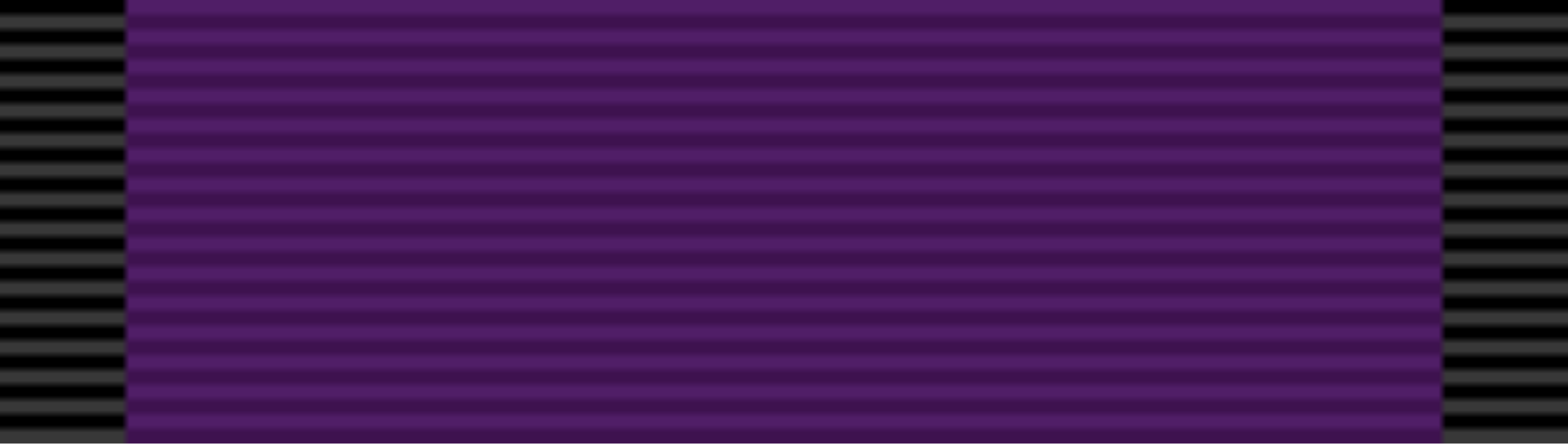
- Massachusetts Medal of Liberty
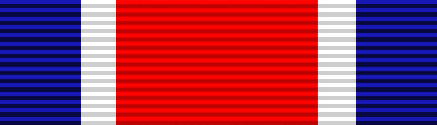
- Massachusetts Medal of Valor
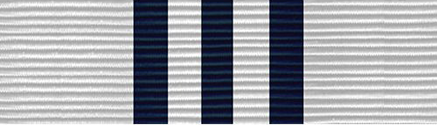
- Massachusetts Military Medal
- Massachusetts Medal of Merit
- Massachusetts Achievement Medal
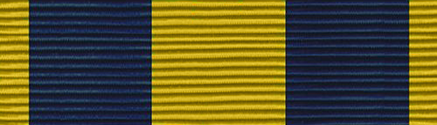
- Massachusetts Humanitarian Service Medal
- Massachusetts ARNG Service Medal
- Massachusetts ANG Service Medal
- Massachusetts Desert Storm Service Ribbon
- Massachusetts Defense Expeditionary Ribbon
- Massachusetts Defense Service Ribbon
- Massachusetts Emergency Service Ribbon
- Massachusetts Meritorious Unit Citation

== Michigan ==
Michigan National Guard State Awards:

- Michigan Medal for Valor
- Michigan Distinguished Service Medal
- Michigan Lifesaving Medal
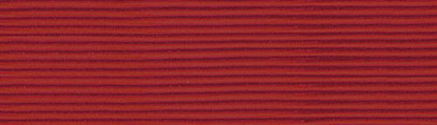
- Michigan Legion of Merit
- Michigan Recruiting Ribbon
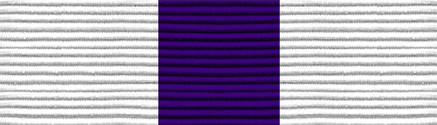
- Michigan Honor Guard Ribbon
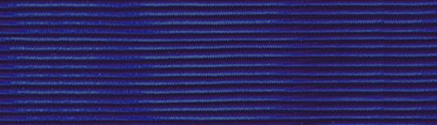
- Michigan Broadsword Service Medal
- Michigan Active State Service Ribbon
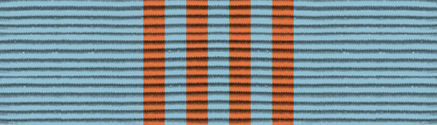
- Michigan State War on Terrorism Ribbon
- Michigan Outside U.S. Service Ribbon
- - Michigan Outside U.S. Training Ribbon
- Michigan State Partnership Ribbon

== Minnesota ==
Minnesota National Guard State Awards:

- Minnesota Distinguished Service Medal - To be awarded to any citizen, or former citizen, of Minnesota who, while serving as a member of the military forces of the State of Minnesota or as member of the Armed Forces of the United States, shall have distinguished himself or herself by exceptionally meritorious service to the State or Nation in a duty of great responsibility.
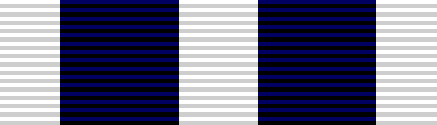
- Minnesota Medal for Valor - The Medal of Valor will be awarded to any person who, while a member of the Minnesota National Guard, distinguishes himself or herself by courageous conduct and gallantry, beyond the call of duty and at risk of his or her life, while in the service of the State of Minnesota or the United States.
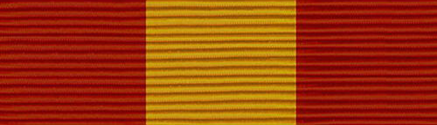
- Minnesota Medal for Merit - The Minnesota Medal for Merit may be awarded to any member of the Minnesota National Guard who, while serving as a member of the military forces of the State of Minnesota or as a member of the Armed Forces of the United States shall have distinguished themselves by exceptionally meritorious service/achievement.
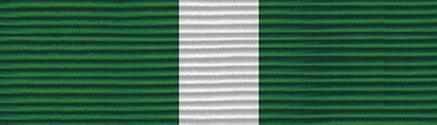
- Minnesota Commendation Medal - To be awarded to any member of the Minnesota National Guard who distinguishes himself or herself by unusually meritorious achievement or service accomplished while in the service of the State or Nation. Approved at the O-6 command level and above. Similar to an Army Commendation Medal (ARCOM).
- Minnesota Achievement Ribbon - The Minnesota Achievement Ribbon is awarded to any member of the Minnesota National Guard who distinguishes himself or herself by unusually meritorious achievement or service accomplished while in the service of the State or Nation. Approved at the O-5 command level and above. Similar to an Army Achievement Medal (AAM).
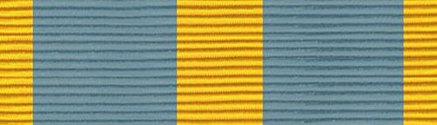
- Minnesota Good Conduct Ribbon - The Minnesota Good Conduct Ribbon will be awarded to enlisted members of the Minnesota National Guard and enlisted AGR (Title 32) members who have completed three years of enlisted service, attend 95 percent of the drills and days of annual training held by the unit of which assigned and whose record and behavior sets such a good example that the morale of the entire organization of which they are members was enhanced. Awarded by unit commanders.
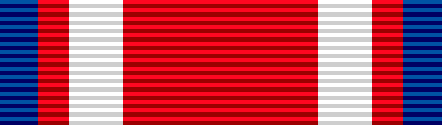
- Minnesota State Active Duty Ribbon - A State Active Duty Ribbon will be administratively awarded to any member of the Minnesota National Guard who is ordered to State Active Duty (SAD) with the State of Minnesota during a natural disaster or civil disorder. Awarded by Joint Force Headquarters - Minnesota.
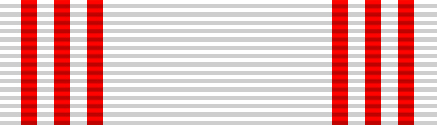
- Minnesota Distinguished Recruiting Ribbon - The Distinguished Recruiting Ribbon will be awarded to members of the Minnesota National Guard who distinguishes themselves in the area of recruiting. The Adjutant General of Minnesota has delegated the approval and award authority of the Distinguished Recruiting Ribbon to commanders in the grade of O6 (COL/Col) and above.
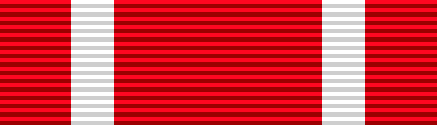
- Minnesota Service Ribbon - The Minnesota Service Ribbon will be administratively awarded to officers and enlisted members of the Minnesota National Guard upon the initial completion of three years commissioned or enlisted service, or a combination thereof. Subsequent awards will be issued with gold roman numeral devices in five-year increments (V, X, XV, XX) to depict the number of years of service to the Minnesota National Guard. Unit commanders are authorized to award the Minnesota Service Ribbon to personnel serving under their command jurisdiction who meet established criteria.

== Mississippi ==
Mississippi National Guard State Awards

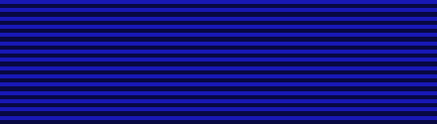
- Mississippi Medal of Honor
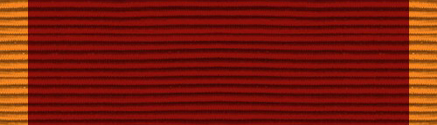
- Mississippi Magnolia Cross - Awarded to any member or former member of the Mississippi National Guard who has distinguished themselves by exceptionally meritorious service in a duty of great responsibility, or by unselfish and untiring activities while in state service or in support of the Mississippi National Guard, has rendered a distinct service in furthering the security and welfare of the state.
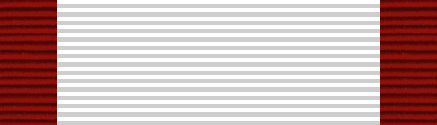
- Mississippi Magnolia Medal - Awarded to any member or former member of the Mississippi National Guard, or any of the armed services of the United States, who distinguishes themselves through outstanding service or extraordinary achievement in behalf of the Mississippi National Guard.
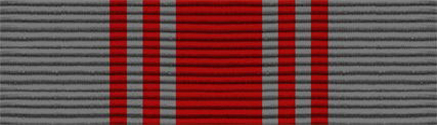
- Mississippi Commendation Medal - May be awarded to any member or former member of the Mississippi National Guard for meritorious service or meritorious achievement on behalf of the state of Mississippi.
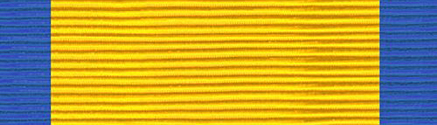
- Mississippi Medal of Efficiency - Awarded to enlisted members of the active Mississippi National Guard who have over five (5) years honorable service in the active Mississippi National Guard and have exhibited exemplary behavior, efficiency and loyalty to their unit and the Mississippi National Guard.
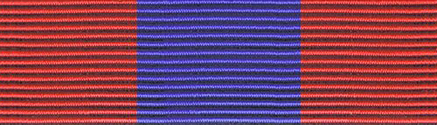
- Mississippi War Medal -Awarded to any member of the Mississippi National Guard for honorable service in the Armed Forces of the U.S. during National Emergency declared by the Congress.
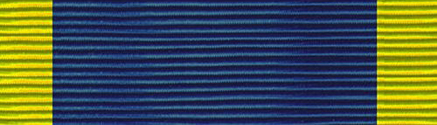
- Mississippi Emergency Service Medal - Awarded to any member of the Mississippi National Guard for honoraqble service to the State of Mississippi for duty performed during a major tour of state emergency duty declared by the Adjutant General.
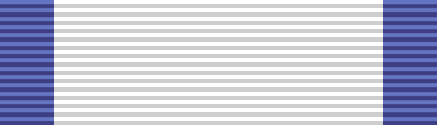
- Mississippi Service School Medal - Awarded to any member of the Mississippi National Guard upon successful completion of any Service School conducted by the active military services while a member of the active Mississippi National Guard not serving in active federal service.
- Mississippi Longevity Medal - Awarded to any member of the Mississippi National Guard for each of a combination of four (4) years of honorable service in the active National Guard of Mississippi.
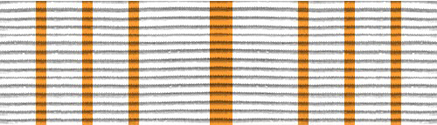
- Mississippi Recruiting Medal - Awarded to any member of the Mississippi National Guard who obtains three new members for any unit of the organized militia.
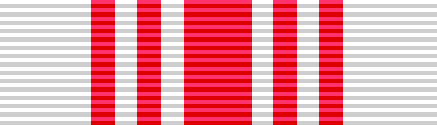
- Mississippi Soldier of the Year Ribbon - First issued in 2012, unknown in order of precedence.

== Missouri ==
Missouri National Guard State Awards:

- Missouri Meritorious Service Medal
- Missouri Conspicuous Service Medal
- Missouri Commendation Ribbon
- Missouri Desert Storm Ribbon
- Missouri 20 Year Long Service Ribbon
- Missouri 15 Year Long Service Ribbon
- Missouri 10 Year Long Service Ribbon
- Missouri 5 Year Long Service Ribbon
- Missouri First Sergeant Ribbon
- Missouri Expeditionary Ribbon
- Missouri State Emergency Duty Ribbon
- Missouri Panamanian Service Ribbon
- Missouri Afghanistan Campaign Ribbon
- Missouri Kosovo Campaign Ribbon
- Missouri Recruiting and Retention Ribbon
- Missouri Adjutant General's Twenty Ribbon
- Missouri Governor's Twelve Ribbon
- Missouri Basic Training Ribbon
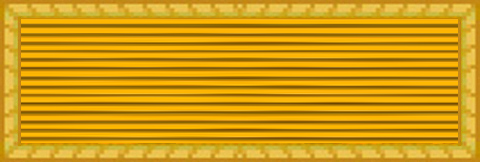
- Governor's Unit Citation
- Ourstanding SGT Hood Award

== Montana ==
Montana National Guard State Awards:

- Montana Distinguished Service Medal
- Montana Commendation Medal
- Montana Air Medal
- Montana Distinguished Patriot Medal
- Montana Recruiting Ribbon
- Montana Campaign Ribbon
- Montana Noble Eagle Ribbon
- Montana Overseas Training Ribbon
- Montana Volunteer Campaign Ribbon
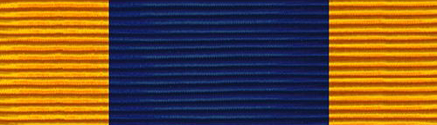
- Montana Service Ribbon
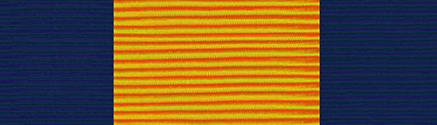
- Montana Attendance Ribbon
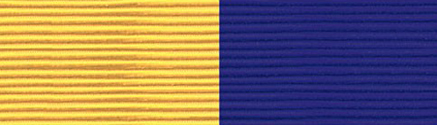
- Montana Physical Fitness Ribbon
- Montana Outstanding Unit

== Nebraska ==
Nebraska National Guard State Awards

- Nebraska Legion of Merit
- Nebraska Meritorious Service Medal
- Nebraska Commendation Medal
- Nebraska Outstanding Soldier Medal
- Nebraska Individual Achievement Medal
- Nebraska Recruiting Achievement Medal
- Nebraska Desert Shield/Storm Service Ribbon
- Nebraska Homeland Defense Service Ribbon
- Nebraska Emergency Service Medal
- Nebraska Service Medal
- Nebraska Military Funeral Honors Ribbon

== Nevada ==
Nevada National Guard State Awards:

- Nevada Medal of Valor
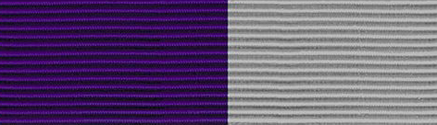
- Maj. Gen. Drennan A. Clark Order of Nevada
- Nevada Distinguished Service Medal
- Nevada Medal of Merit
- Nevada Commendation Medal
- Nevada Command Ribbon
- Nevada Outstanding Airman Ribbon
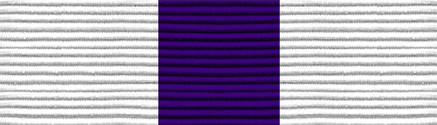
- Nevada Honor Guard Ribbon
- Nevada Resource Protection Team Ribbon
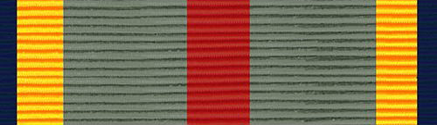
- Nevada Emergency/Humanitarian Service Ribbon
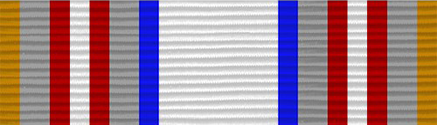
- Nevada Overseas Service Ribbon
- Nevada Meritorious Service Ribbon
- Nevada Service Medal
- Nevada First Sergeant's Ribbon
- Nevada Adjutant General's Outstanding Graduate Award
- Nevada State Safety Ribbon
- Nevada Recruiting Ribbon
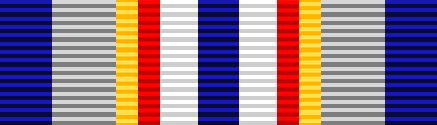
- Nevada War on Terrorism Medal
- Nevada Governor's Outstanding Unit Award

== New Hampshire ==
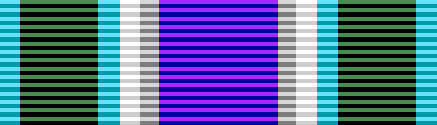
- New Hampshire National Guard Medal of Honor
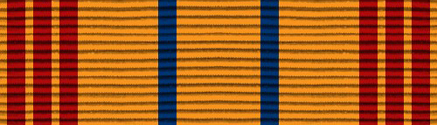
- New Hampshire National Guard Commendation Ribbon
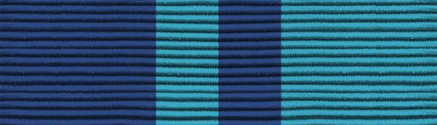
- New Hampshire National Guard Distinguished Service Medal
- New Hampshire National Guard Soldier of the Year Ribbon (ARNG)
- New Hampshire National Guard Airman of the Year Ribbon (ANG)
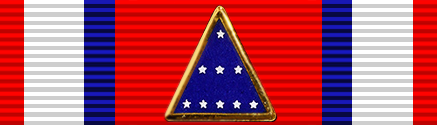
- New Hampshire National Guard Honor Guard Ribbon
- New Hampshire National Guard State Active Service Ribbon
- New Hampshire National Guard Honorary Recruiting Ribbon
- New Hampshire National Guard Counterdrug Task Force Ribbon
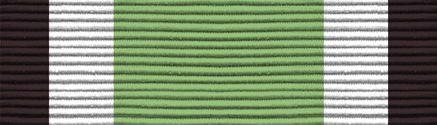
- New Hampshire National Guard Service Bar

== New Jersey ==
New Jersey National Guard State Awards:

- New Jersey Distinguished Service Medal
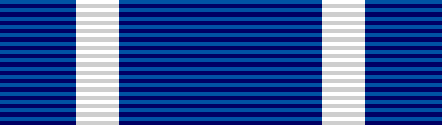
- New Jersey Meritorious Service Medal
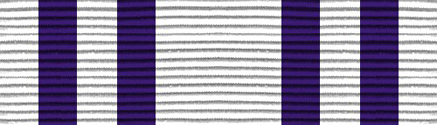
- New Jersey Valor Ribbon
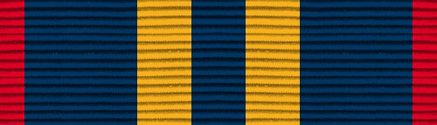
- New Jersey Commendation Medal
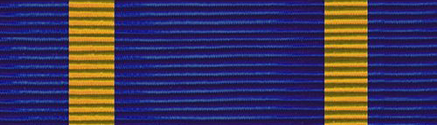
- New Jersey Medal of Honor
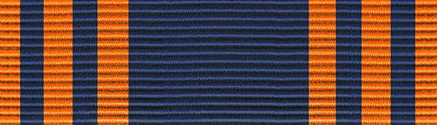
- New Jersey Good Conduct Ribbon
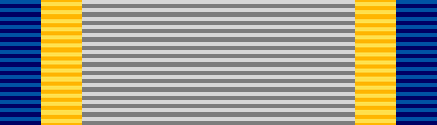
- New Jersey Merit Award
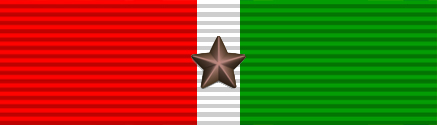
- New Jersey Desert Storm Service Medal
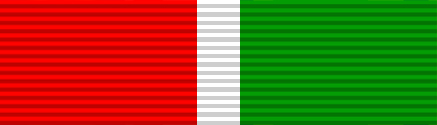
- New Jersey Desert Storm Ribbon
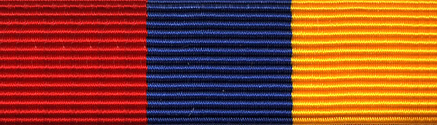
- New Jersey State Service Award
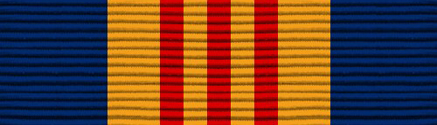
- New Jersey Recruiting Award
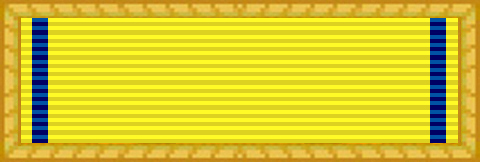
- New Jersey Governor's Unit Award
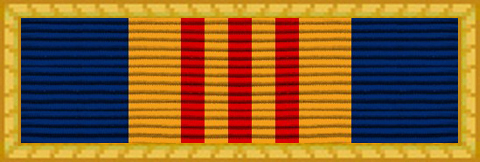
- New Jersey Unit Strength Award

== New Mexico ==
New Mexico National Guard State Awards (in order of precedence from NM Statute 20-10):

- New Mexico Medal of Valor with palm
- New Mexico Medal of Valor
- Special MacArthur Service Medal
- New Mexico Distinguished Service Medal
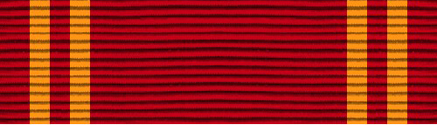
- New Mexico Medal of Merit
- New Mexico Cold War Medal (New Mexico State Defense Force only)
- Outstanding Enlisted Leader of the Year Ribbon
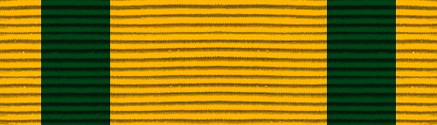
- New Mexico Outstanding Service Medal
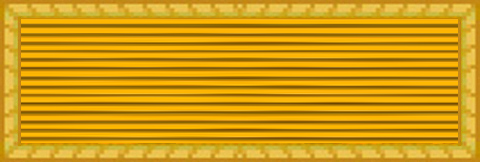
- New Mexico Outstanding Unit Citation
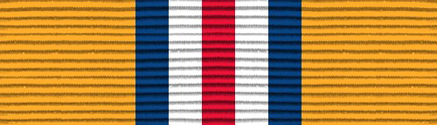
- New Mexico Emergency Service Military Ribbon
- Counter-drug service ribbon
- Community Service Ribbon
- Physical Fitness Ribbon
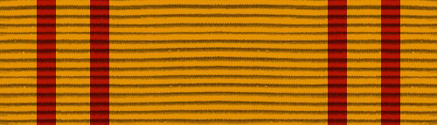
- New Mexico Long Service Medal and Service Ribbon
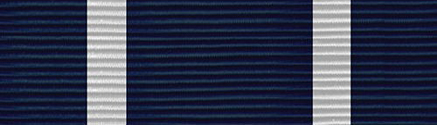
- New Mexico Good Conduct Medal
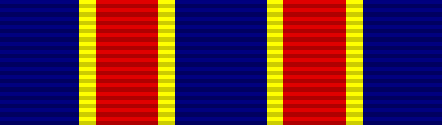
- New Mexico Perfect Attendance Ribbon
- New Mexico Academy Service Ribbon

== New York ==
New York state military awards:

- New York Medal of Valor
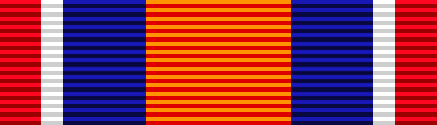
- New York Conspicuous Service Medal
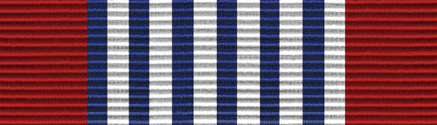
- New York Meritorious Service Medal
- New York Military Commendation Medal
- New York Long and Faithful Service Medal
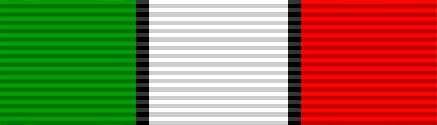
- New York Desert Storm Service Medal
- New York Defense of Liberty Medal
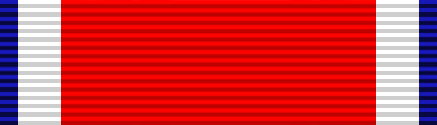
- New York Conspicuous Service Cross
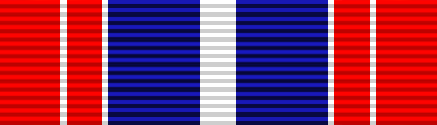
- New York Medal for Merit
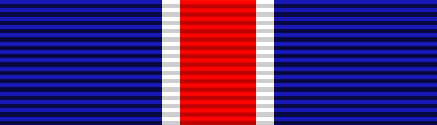
- New York Conspicuous Service Star
- New York Outstanding Airman/Soldier of the Year Ribbon
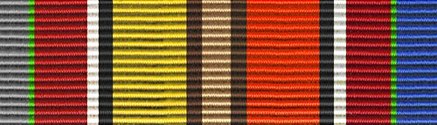
- New York Recruiting Medal
- New York Aid to Civil Authority Medal
- New York Counterdrug Service Ribbon
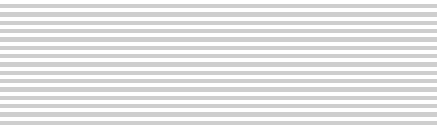
- New York Exercise Support Ribbon
- New York Humane Service to NYS Medal
- New York First Sergeant Ribbon (Army)
- New York First Sergeant Ribbon (Air)
- New York Military Support Medal, 1980 Winter Olympics
- New York Physical Fitness Ribbon

New York National Guard State Awards:

== North Carolina ==
North Carolina National Guard State Awards:

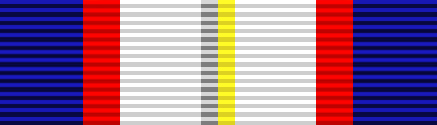
- North Carolina Distinguished Service Medal
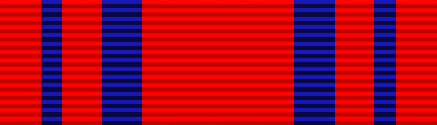
- North Carolina Meritorious Service Medal
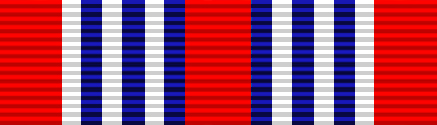
- North Carolina Commendation Medal
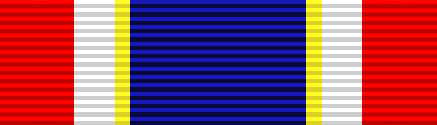
- North Carolina Achievement Medal
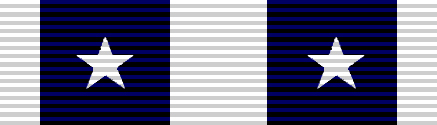
- North Carolina Adjutant General's Meritorious Achievement Service Ribbon
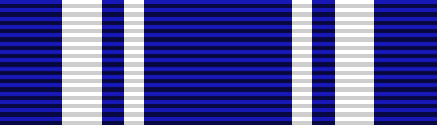
- North Carolina State Active Duty Ribbon
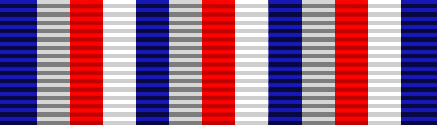
- North Carolina Service Ribbon
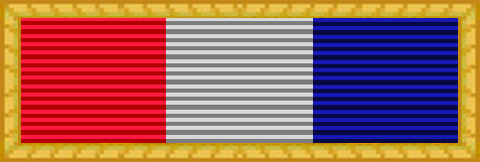
- North Carolina Governor's Unit Citation
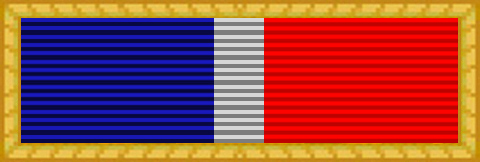
- North Carolina Meritorious Unit Citation
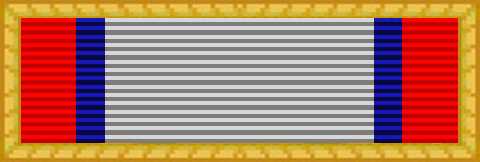
- North Carolina Outstanding Unit Award

== North Dakota ==
North Dakota National Guard State Awards:

Air National Guard Awards:

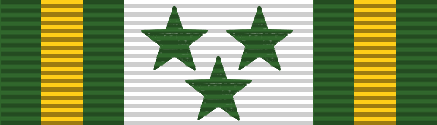
- North Dakota Distinguished Service Medal
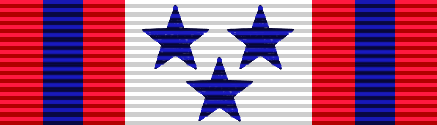
- North Dakota Legion of Merit
- North Dakota State Meritorious Service Ribbon
- North Dakota State Commendation Ribbon
- North Dakota State Achievement Ribbon
- North Dakota Emergency Service Ribbon
- North Dakota State Outstanding Unit Ribbon
- North Dakota OCONUS Ribbon
- North Dakota Recruiting Ribbon
- North Dakota 1st Sergeant Ribbon
- North Dakota Service Ribbon
- North Dakota Basic Training Ribbon

Army National Guard Awards:

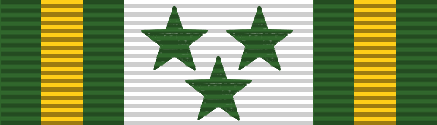
- North Dakota Distinguished Service Medal
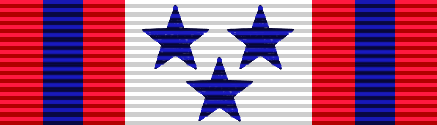
- North Dakota Legion of Merit
- North Dakota State Meritorious Service Ribbon
- North Dakota State Commendation Ribbon
- North Dakota State Achievement Ribbon
- North Dakota Emergency Service Ribbon
- North Dakota Military Funeral Honors Ribbon
- North Dakota Strength Management Ribbon
- North Dakota Service Ribbon
- North Dakota Basic Training Ribbon

Worn on right side, after federal awards:

- North Dakota State Outstanding Unit Citation (Army)

Obsolete or no longer awarded:

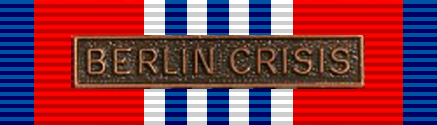
- North Dakota National Emergency Service Ribbon (Berlin Crisis)
- North Dakota Selected Reserve Force Ribbon

== Ohio ==
Ohio National Guard State Awards:

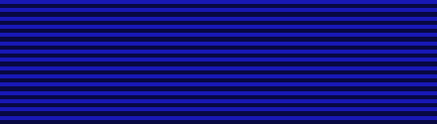
- Ohio Cross Medal
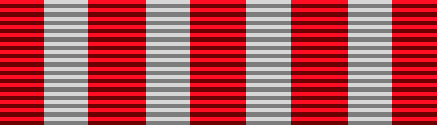
- Ohio Distinguished Service Medal
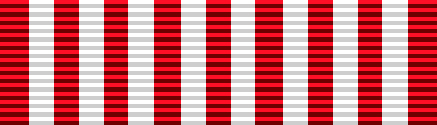
- Ohio Commendation Medal
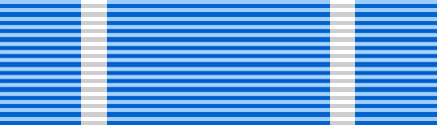
- Ohio Faithful Service Ribbon
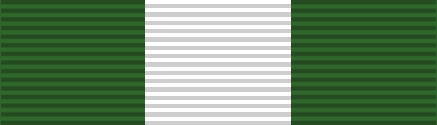
- Ohio Special Service Ribbon
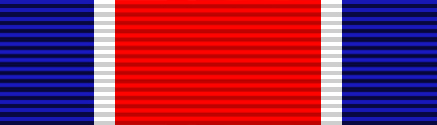
- Ohio Award of Merit Ribbon
- Ohio Basic Training Ribbon
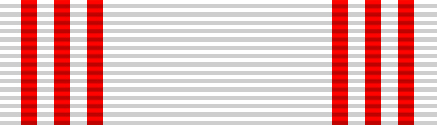
- Ohio Recruiters Achievement Ribbon

== Oklahoma ==
Oklahoma National Guard State Awards:

- Oklahoma Distinguished Service Cross
- Oklahoma Star of Valor
- Oklahoma Distinguished Service Medal
- Oklahoma Meritorious Service Medal
- Oklahoma Commendation Medal
- Oklahoma Exceptional Service Medal
- Oklahoma Guardsman Medal
- Oklahoma Senior Enlisted Leadership Ribbon
- Oklahoma Desert Storm Service Medal
- Oklahoma Selective Reserve Medal
- Oklahoma Alfred P. Murrah Service Medal (Oklahoma Bombing)
- Oklahoma Recruiting Ribbon
- Oklahoma Active Duty Service Medal
- Oklahoma Long Service Ribbon 5 years
- Oklahoma Long Service Ribbon 10 years
- Oklahoma Long Service Ribbon 15 years
- Oklahoma Long Service Ribbon 20 years
- Oklahoma Long Service Ribbon 25 years
- Oklahoma Long Service Ribbon 30 years
- Oklahoma Long Service Ribbon 35 years
- Oklahoma Good Conduct Ribbon
- Oklahoma Governor's Distinguished Unit Award
- Oklahoma Commander's Trophy Award Ribbon

== Oregon ==
Oregon National Guard State Awards:

- Oregon Distinguished Service Medal
- Oregon Exceptional Service Medal
- Oregon Meritorious Service Medal
- Oregon Commendation Medal
- Oregon 30 Year Faithful Service Medal
- Oregon Emergency Service Ribbon
- Oregon Superior Soldier Ribbon
- Oregon Faithful Service Medal
- Oregon Recruiting Ribbon
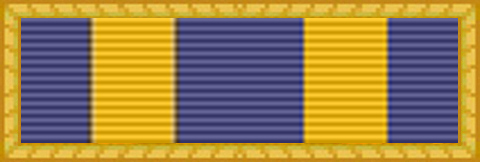
- Oregon Superior Unit Ribbon

== Pennsylvania ==
Pennsylvania National Guard Commonwealth Awards:

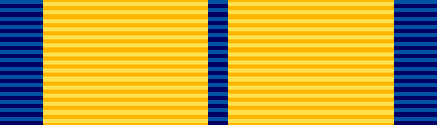
- Pennsylvania Cross for Valor
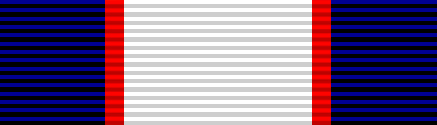
- Pennsylvania Distinguished Service Medal
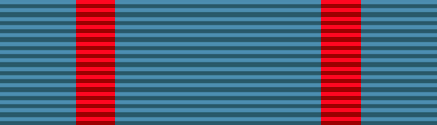
- Pennsylvania Guardsman Medal
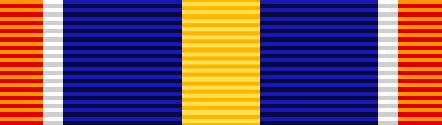
- Pennsylvania Meritorious Service Medal
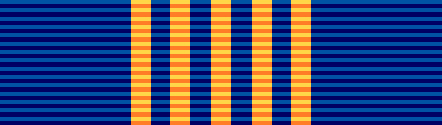
- Pennsylvania Commendation Medal
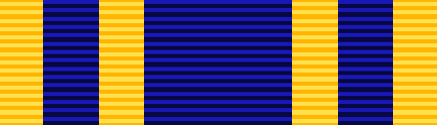
- Pennsylvania Service Ribbon
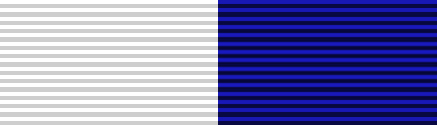
- Pennsylvania GEN William Moffat-Reilly Medal
- Pennsylvania Keystone Freedom Medal
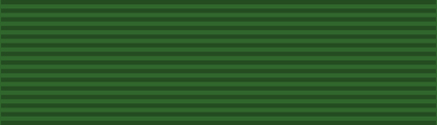
- Pennsylvania 20 Year Medal
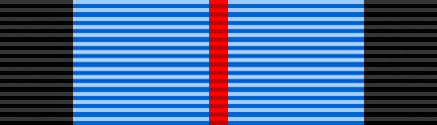
- Pennsylvania MG Thomas. R. White Medal
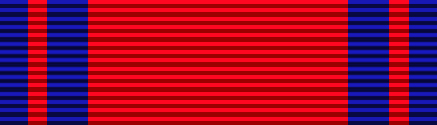
- Pennsylvania Recruiting and Retention Medal
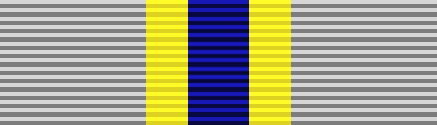
- Pennsylvania GEN Thomas. J. Stewart Medal
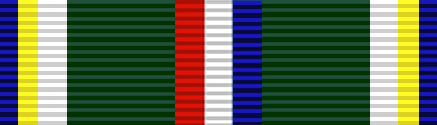
- Pennsylvania Military Honors Program Service
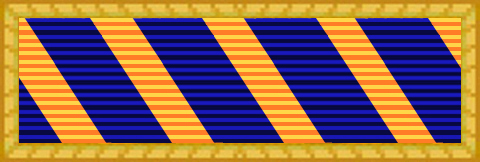
- Pennsylvania Governor's Unit Citation Air Force Service
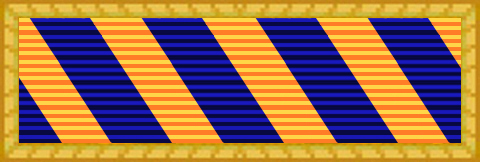
- Pennsylvania Governor's Unit Citation Army Service

== Puerto Rico ==
Puerto Rico National Guard Commonwealth Awards:

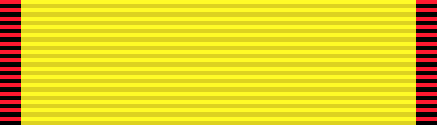
- Military Medal of Honor of the Legislative Assembly of Puerto Rico
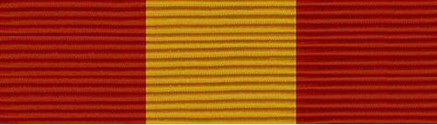
- Puerto Rico Medal for Distinguished Service
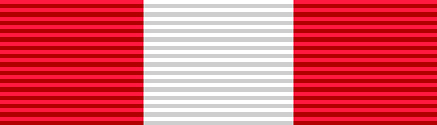
- Puerto Rico Medal of Valor
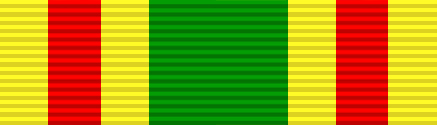
- Puerto Rico Merit Cross
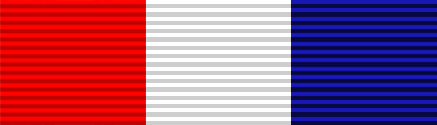
- Puerto Rico Wounded in Action Medal
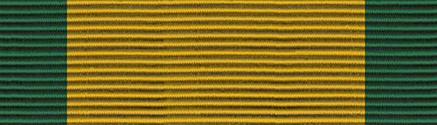
- Order of the Governor of Puerto Rico Common Defense Service Medal
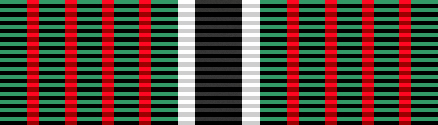
- Puerto Rico Combat Service Medal
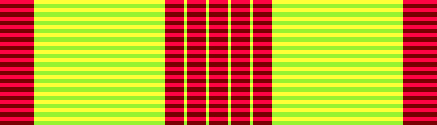
- Puerto Rico Commendation Medal
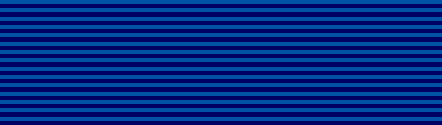
- Puerto Rico Outstanding Soldier/NCO of the Year Ribbon
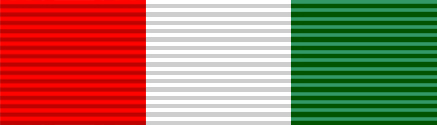
- Puerto Rico Service Medal
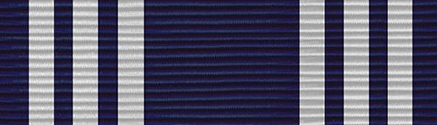
- Puerto Rico Exemplary Conduct Ribbon
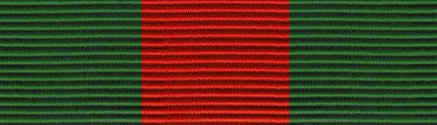
- Puerto Rico War Service Ribbon
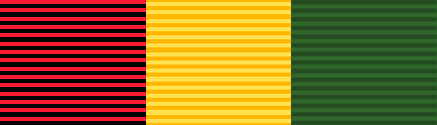
- Puerto Rico SG Merit Achievement Award
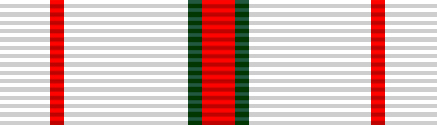
- Puerto Rico Disaster Relief Ribbon
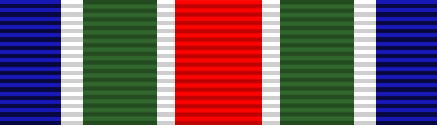
- Puerto Rico Hurricane Georges Ribbon
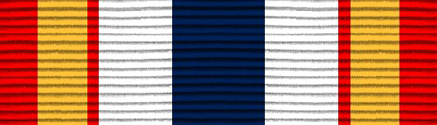
- Puerto Rico Active Duty for Training Ribbon
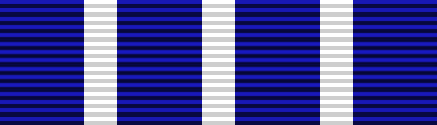
- Puerto Rico Caribbean Emergency Ribbon
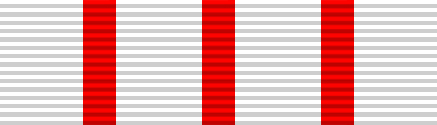
- Puerto Rico Civil Disturbance Ribbon
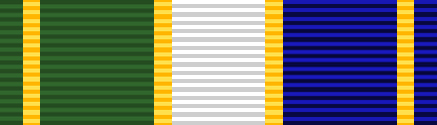
- Puerto Rico Law Enforcement Ribbon
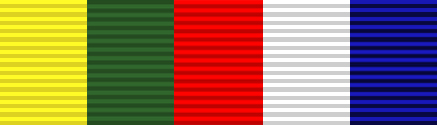
- Puerto Rico VIII Pan-American Games Support Ribbon
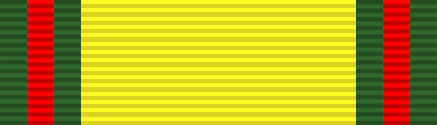
- Puerto Rico English Language Proficiecy Ribbon
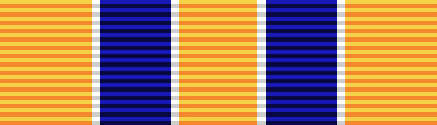
- Puerto Rico Counterdrug Service Ribbon
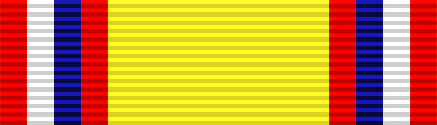
- Puerto Rico 1992 Regatta Ribbon
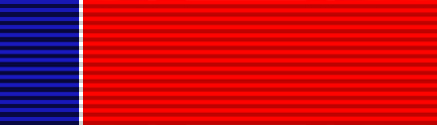
- Puerto Rico Community Service Ribbon

== Rhode Island ==
Rhode Island medals are prescribed in Title 30 of the Rhode Island Code.

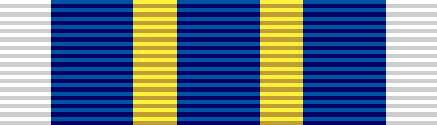
- Rhode Island Cross
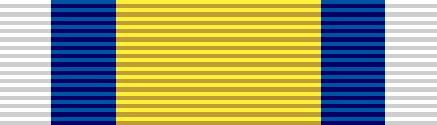
- Rhode Island Star
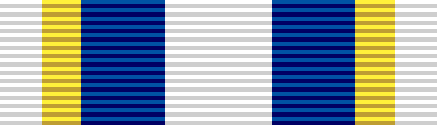
- Rhode Island Commendation Medal
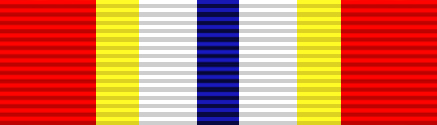
- Rhode Island National Guard Defense Service Medal
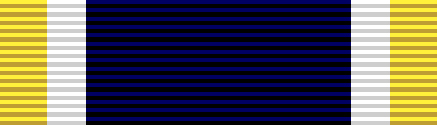
- Rhode Island National Guard Service Medal
- Rhode Island National Guard Emergency State Ribbon
- Rhode Island Army National Guard Recruiting Ribbon
- Rhode Island Air National Guard Recruiting Ribbon
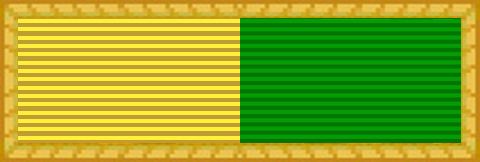
- Rhode Island Gubernatorial Unit Award

== South Carolina ==
South Carolina National Guard State Awards:

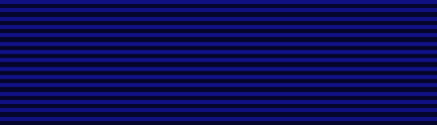
- South Carolina Palmetto Cross
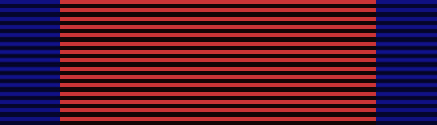
- South Carolina Medal of Valor
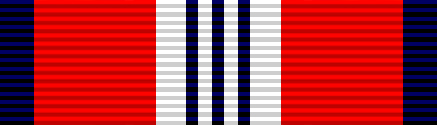
- South Carolina Exceptional Service Medal
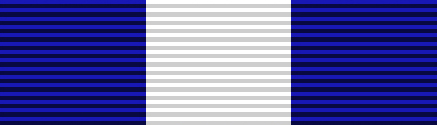
- South Carolina Extraordinary Achievement Medal
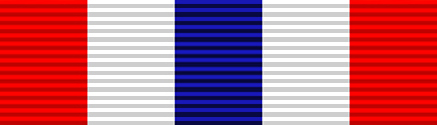
- South Carolina Meritorious Service Medal
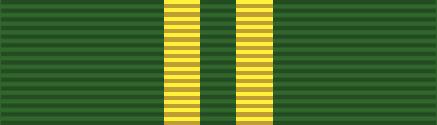
- South Carolina Achievement Ribbon
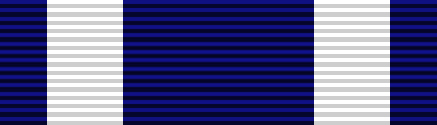
- South Carolina State Service Ribbon
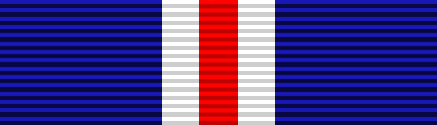
- South Carolina Retirement Medal
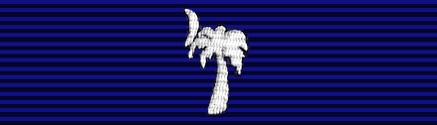
- South Carolina Palmetto Service Ribbon
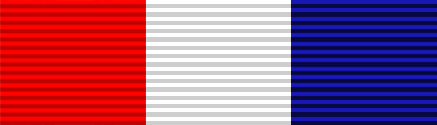
- South Carolina National Guard Mobilization Support Award Ribbon
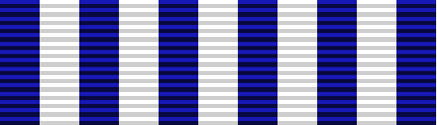
- South Carolina Cadet Medal of Merit Service Ribbon
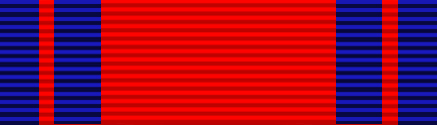
- South Carolina Recruiting and Retention Achievement Medal
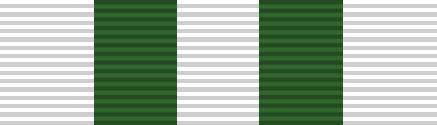
- South Carolina Safety Service Ribbon
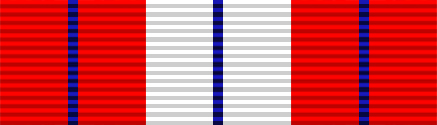
- South Carolina Counter-Drug Ribbon
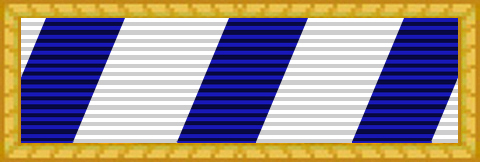
- South Carolina Governor's Unit Citation

== South Dakota ==
South Dakota National Guard State Awards:

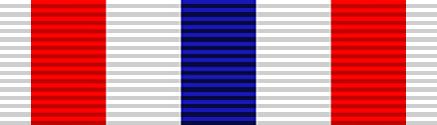
- South Dakota Medal of Valor
- South Dakota Achievement Ribbon
- South Dakota Distinguished Service Award
- South Dakota Emergency Operations Ribbon
- South Dakota Recruiting Medal
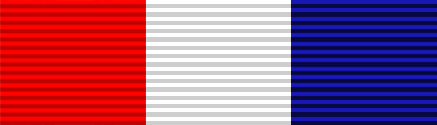
- South Dakota Service Medal
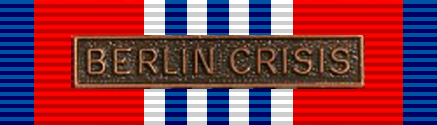
- South Dakota Berlin Crisis Medal
- South Dakota Desert Storm Ribbon
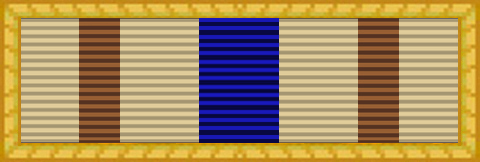
- South Dakota Desert Storm Unit Citation
- South Dakota Unit Citation
- South Dakota Distinguished Unit Award

== Tennessee ==
Tennessee National Guard Awards:

- Tennessee Distinguished Service Medal
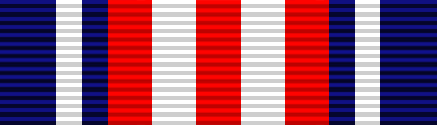
- Tennessee Ribbon for Valor
- Tennessee Distinguished Patriot Medal
- Tennessee Commendation Ribbon
- Tennessee Individual Achievement Ribbon
- Tennessee Recruiting Merit Ribbon
- Tennessee National Emergency Service Medal
- Tennessee War Service Ribbon
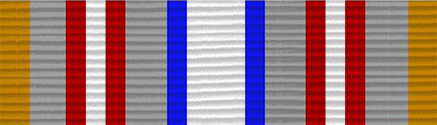
- Tennessee Counterdrug Service Ribbon
- Tennessee Service Ribbon
- Tennessee Volunteer Ribbon
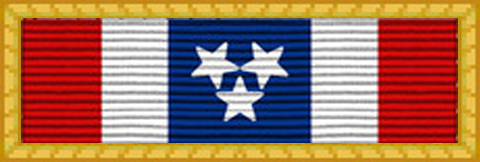
- Tennessee Meritorious Unit Citation
- Tennessee Distinguished Unit Citation
- Tennessee Outstanding Unit Performance Commendation
- Tennessee Volunteer Recruiting and Retention Unit Citation

== Texas ==
Texas National Guard State Awards:

- Texas Legislative Medal of Honor
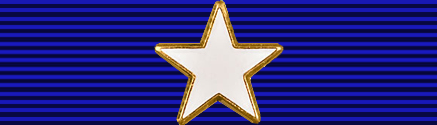
- Texas Medal of Valor
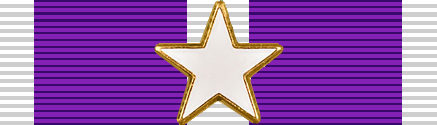
- Texas Purple Heart Medal
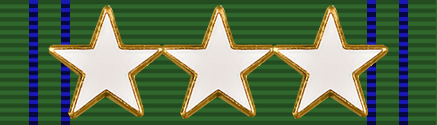
- Texas Superior Service Medal
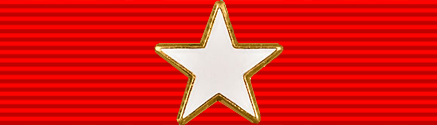
- Texas Lone Star Distinguished Service Medal
- Texas Outstanding Service Medal
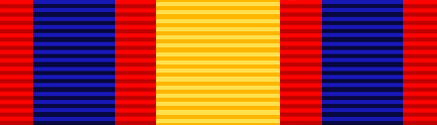
- Texas Medal of Merit (also awarded with "V" for valor)
- Texas Cold War Medal
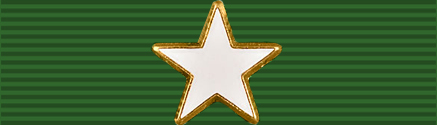
- Texas Adjutant General's Individual Award
- Texas Federal Service Medal
- Texas Desert Shield-Desert Storm Campaign Medal
- Texas Humanitarian Service Ribbon
- Texas Homeland Defense Service Medal
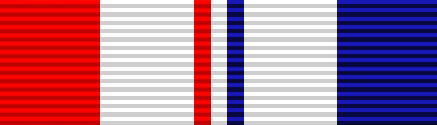
- Texas Combat Service Ribbon
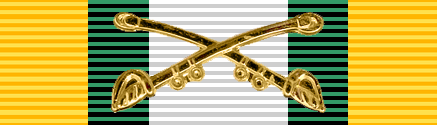
- Texas Cavalry Service Medal
- Texas Faithful Service Medal
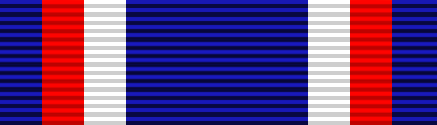
- Texas State Guard Association Service Ribbon
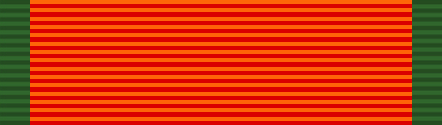
- Texas State Commanding General's Individual Award Ribbon
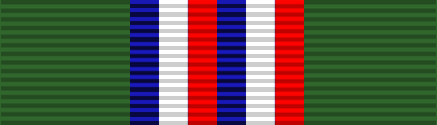
- Texas State Guard Enlisted Personnel Basic Training Ribbon
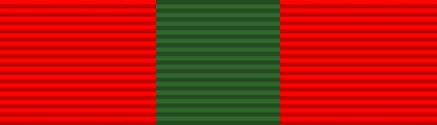
- Texas State Guard NCO Professional Development Service Ribbon
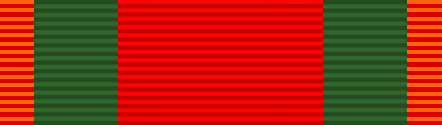
- Texas State Guard Officer Professional Development Service Ribbon
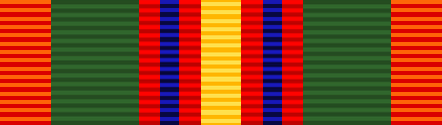
- Texas State Guard Meritorious Service Ribbon
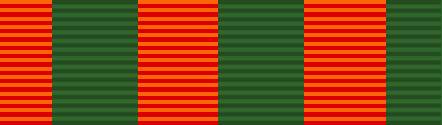
- Texas State Guard Recruiting Service Ribbon
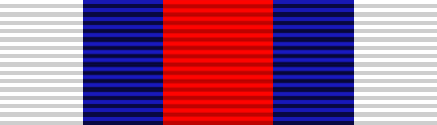
- Texas State Guard Physical Fitness Service Ribbon
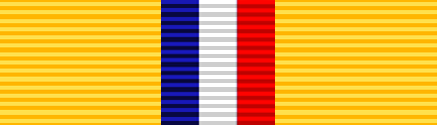
- Texas State Guard Service Medal Ribbon
- Texas Governor's Unit Citation
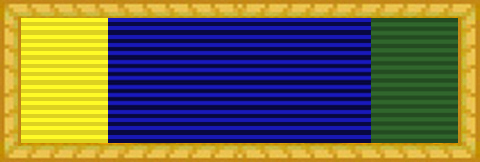
- Texas Organizational Excellence Unit Award
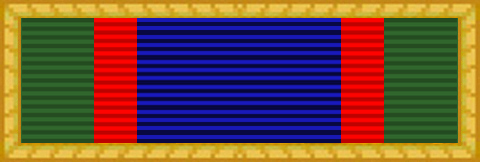
- Texas State Guard Meritorious Unit Award

== Utah ==
Utah National Guard State Awards:

Reference Pictures available at Utah National Guard.

- Utah Medal of Valor
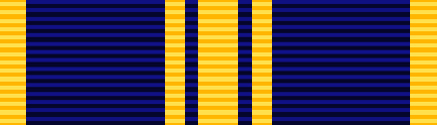
- Utah Cross
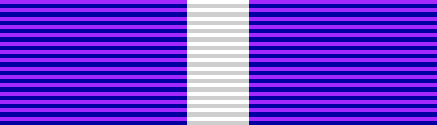
- Utah Medal of Merit
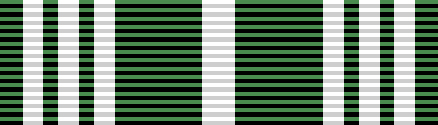
- Utah Commendation Medal
- Utah Deteur Digniory
- Utah 2002 Olympic Winter Games Service Ribbon
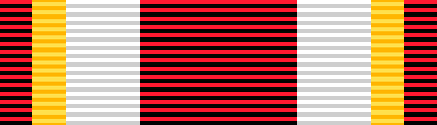
- Utah Emergency Service Ribbon
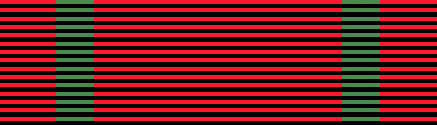
- Utah State Partnership Program Ribbon
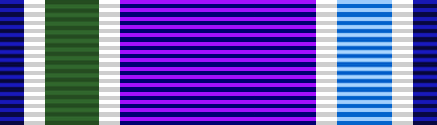
- Utah Joint Staff Service Ribbon
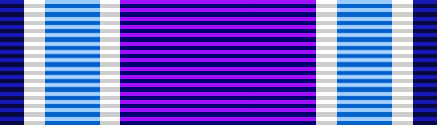
- Utah Joint Commendation Service Ribbon
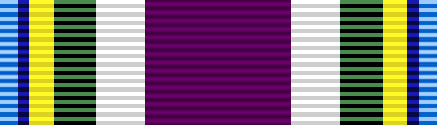
- Utah National Guard Patriot Service Ribbon
- Utah Recruiting Ribbon
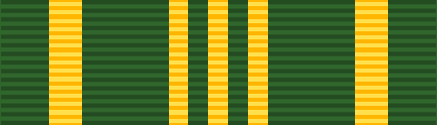
- Utah Achievement Ribbon
- Utah Service Ribbon
- Utah Basic Training Ribbon
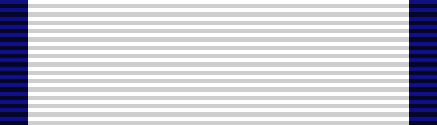
- Utah Military Funeral Service Ribbon

== Vermont ==
Vermont National Guard State Awards:

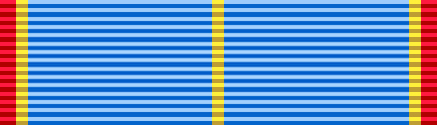
- Vermont Distinguished Service Medal (National Guard award)
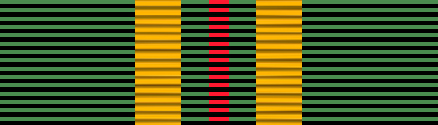
- Vermont Medal of Merit
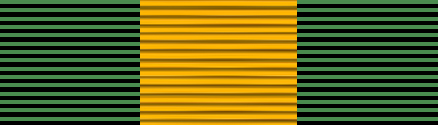
- Vermont Commendation Medal
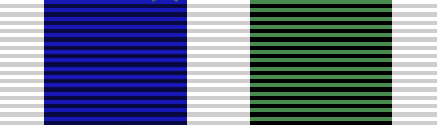
- Vermont Meritorious Service Ribbon
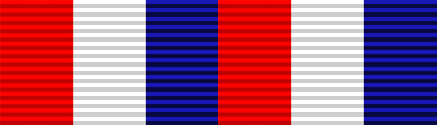
- Vermont Outstanding Unit Award
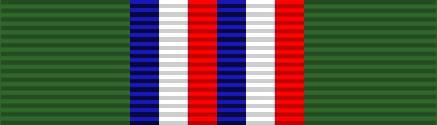
- Vermont Organizational Excellence Award
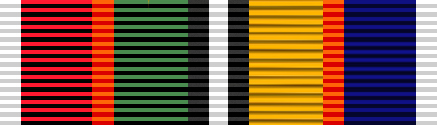
- Vermont World War II Medal
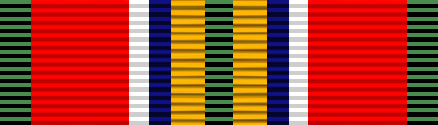
- Vermont National Defense Medal
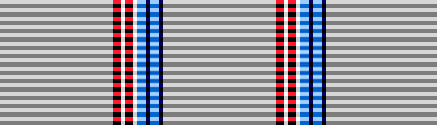
- Vermont Good Conduct Ribbon
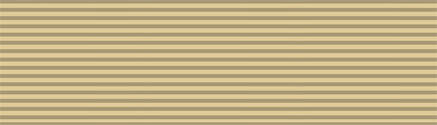
- Vermont Desert Storm Ribbon
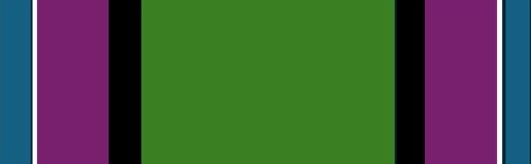
- Vermont Military Humanitarian Service Medal
- Vermont Active Duty for Training Ribbon
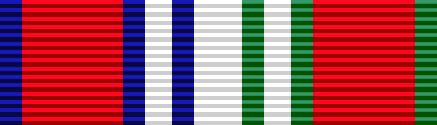
- Vermont Professional Development Ribbon
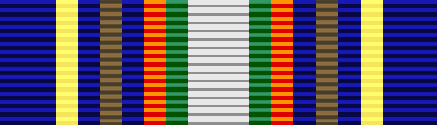
- Vermont Career Service Award
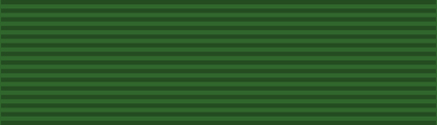
- Vermont Service Ribbon
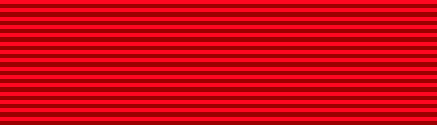
- Vermont Duty Ribbon
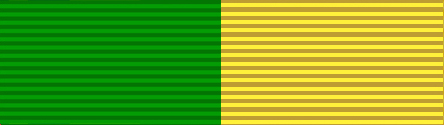
- Vermont State Special Duty Ribbon

Related:

- Vermont Patriots Medal
- Vermont Distinguished Service Medal (Veterans award)
- Vermont Veterans Medal

== Virgin Islands ==
Virgin Islands National Guard Territory Awards

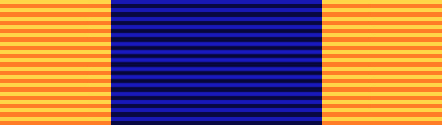
- Virgin Islands Distinguished Service Medal
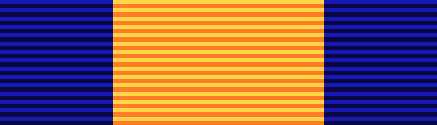
- Virgin Islands Meritorious Service Medal
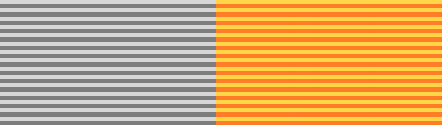
- Virgin Islands Commendation Medal
- Virgin Islands Long and Faithful Service Medal
- Virgin Islands Emergency Service Ribbon

== Virginia ==
Listed in order of precedence when worn or displayed:

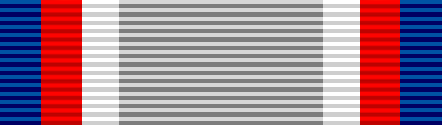
- Virginia Distinguished Service Medal
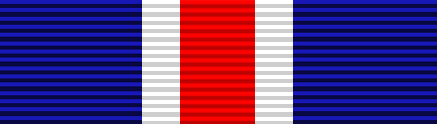
- Virginia National Guard Legion of Merit
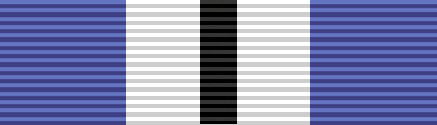
- Virginia National Guard Bronze Star Medal
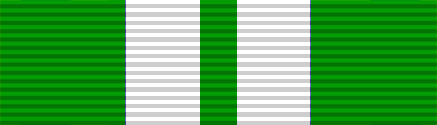
- Virginia National Guard Commendation Medal
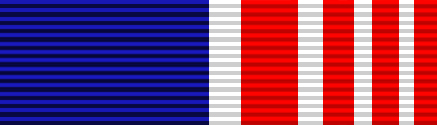
- Virginia Governor's National Service Medal
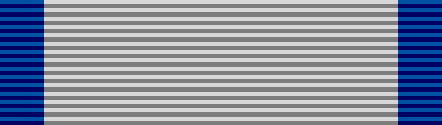
- Virginia National Guard 3-year Service Ribbon
- Virginia National Guard Homeland Defense Ribbon
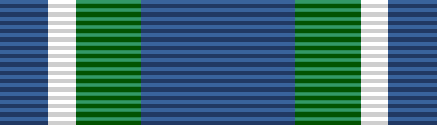
- Virginia National Guard Emergency Service Ribbon
- Virginia National Guard Perfect Attendance Ribbon
- Virginia National Guard Strength Maintenance Ribbon
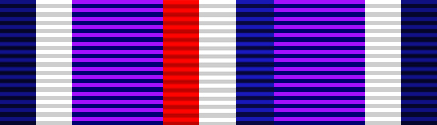
- Virginia National Guard Military Funeral Honors Ribbon

== Washington ==
Washington National Guard State Awards:

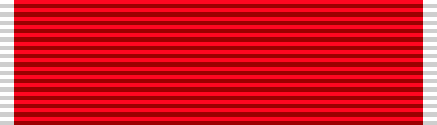
- Washington Cross of Valor - This decoration may be awarded to a member who distinguished himself/herself by extraordinary heroism or extraordinary lifesaving action involving voluntary risk of life in connection with military duties. The act must clearly demonstrate actions so extraordinary as to set the individual apart from his/her peers. This award was originally discontinued on 30 September 1998 but later reinstituted on 02 January 2018.
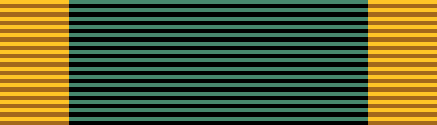
- Washington Distinguished Service Medal (WSDSM) - This decoration shall be awarded to any person who distinguishes himself/herself by exceptionally meritorious service as a member or in affiliation to the State of Washington in duty of great responsibility. The performance must be such as to merit recognition for service that is clearly exceptional and of a conspicuously higher degree than appropriate for award of the WSLM.
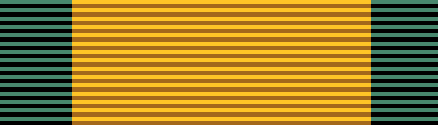
- Washington Legion of Merit Medal (WSLM) - This decoration shall be awarded to any person who has distinguished himself/herself in the performance of exceptionally meritorious service and/or outstanding achievements as member or in affiliation to the State of Washington. The performance must be such as to merit recognition for service that is clearly exceptional over an extended period of time or achievements conspicuously greater than those appropriate for lesser decorations.
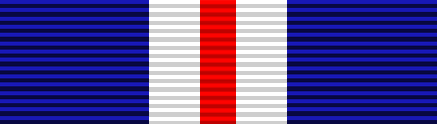
- Washington Aviation Cross Medal (Discontinued as of 30 September 1998)
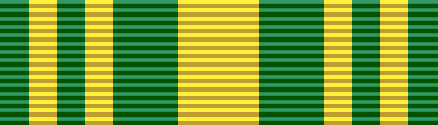
- Washington Guardsman Medal (WSGM) - This decoration shall be awarded to any person who demonstrates extreme courage in the performance of a heroic act involving personal hazard or danger. This decoration may not be awarded solely on the basis of having saved a life.
- Washington Meritorious Service Medal (WSMSM) - This decoration shall be awarded to any person who has distinguished himself/herself by performing meritorious service and/or achievements, as a member or in affiliation with the Military Department, State of Washington. This decoration is awarded for service over an extended period of time or achievements conspicuously greater than those appropriate for award of the WSCM. This decoration is not appropriate for presentation as an impact award.
- Washington Commendation Medal (WSCM) - This decoration shall be awarded to any person who distinguishes himself/herself by heroism, and/or extraordinary duty performance, as a member or in affiliation with the Military Department, State of Washington. This decoration is awarded for accomplishments of a lesser degree and shorter service duration than required for award of the WSMSM. This decoration is appropriate for presentation as an impact award.
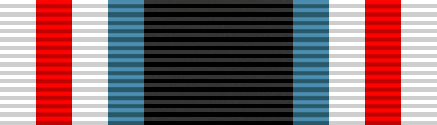
- Washington Achievement Medal (WSAM) - This decoration shall be awarded to any person who distinguishes himself/herself by specific acts and/or achievements resulting in enhanced or increased unit readiness, operations, morale, or mission accomplishment, as a member or in affiliation with the Military Department, State of Washington. This decoration is awarded for accomplishments of a lesser degree and shorter service duration than required for the WSCM. The WSAM is appropriate for presentation as an impact award.
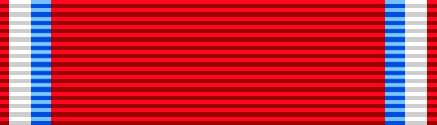
- Washington Strength Management Ribbon (WSSMR) - Previously known as the Washington State Distinguished Recruiting Ribbon it was renamed 31 January 1999. This ribbon shall be awarded to anyone who recruits an individual or causes a Soldier to reenlist/extend (retention attributed to a specific Soldier) during a one-year period. Only one award will be given in any one-year period. Full-time recruiting force personnel and Soldiers on orders as recruiter aides are ineligible for this award.
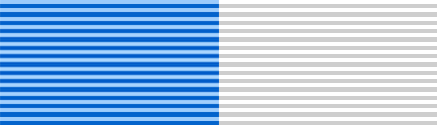
- Washington State Defense Service Ribbon (WSDSR) (Discontinued - 31 December 1994; Reestablished 18 June 2002) - This ribbon shall be awarded to any Soldier of the Washington Army National Guard inducted into Active Federal Service (Title 32 or 10) upon declaration of an emergency by the President of the United States or for special operations at any time between 7 December 1943 to 31 December 1994 and after 11 September 2001.
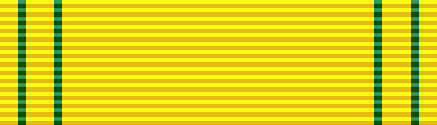
- Washington Emergency Service Ribbon (WSESR) - Previously known as the Washington State Disaster Relief Ribbon from 3 May 1963 to 31 December 1994. This ribbon shall be awarded to any person ordered by the governor into state active duty or to any individual(s) providing support services during a declared state of emergency. An individual must work one day (minimum of eight hours) in order to be eligible to receive this award.
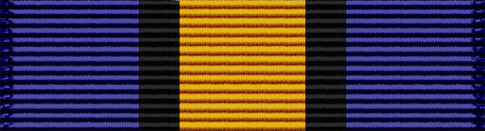
- Washington Counterdrug Service Ribbon (WSCSR) - This ribbon is awarded to any Soldier or Airman for service while assigned to the Counterdrug Task Force, or while on orders to perform counterdrug duty for more than 90 days. Service Members who are suspended from favorable personnel actions, or are undergoing disciplinary action are not eligible to receive this award. Service Members may only earn one WSCSR.
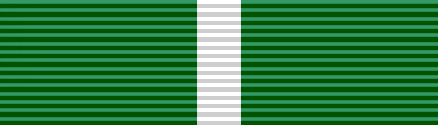
- Washington National Guard Service Ribbon (WANGSR) - This ribbon is awarded to any Soldier of the Washington Army National Guard upon completion of five years of satisfactory service in any of the Armed Forces of the United States, or components thereof. The Soldier must be a member of the WAARNG when the ribbon is presented. Regardless of the number of years of service beyond five, the recipient will receive only one initial ribbon upon assignment to the WAARNG or WSG. Thereafter, the Soldier will receive subsequent awards at five year increments so long as they are otherwise entitled. The individual's pay entry base date (PEBD) will be used to determine year of service for this award.
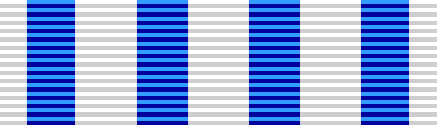
- Washington Good Conduct Medal (Discontinued as of 31 December 1994)
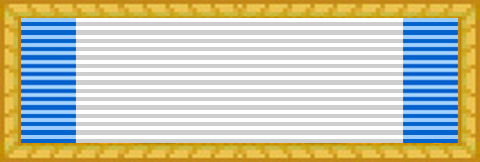
- Washington Unit Citation Ribbon (WSUCR) (Right Side) - This ribbon shall be awarded to each member of a Washington Army National Guard unit or Washington State Guard which is cited by TAG or a higher military headquarters for notable achievement, such as winning the Eisenhower Trophy, the Draper Armor Award, or the Superior Unit Award. Only one unit citation will be awarded to a unit during a single calendar year regardless of the number of notable achievements. Only those who were members of the unit during the period for which the citation was earned will wear the award. Soldiers who received the ribbon may continue to wear it when transferred. Individuals transferring into a cited unit who are not otherwise entitled, will not be authorized the ribbon. The Washington State Unit Citation will not be awarded in conjunction with the Army Superior Unit Award.

Washington Air National Guard Awards:

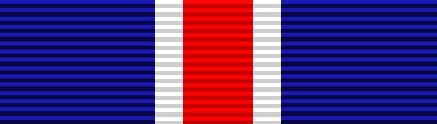
- Washington Air National Guard Aviation Cross - (Discontinued as of 1 April 2018)
- Washington Air National Guard Aerial Achievement Medal - (Discontinued as of 1 April 2018)
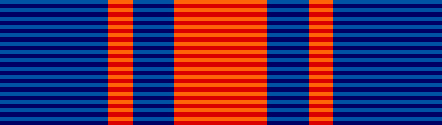
- Washington Air National Guard Distinguished Recruiting Award - (Discontinued as of 1 April 2018)

== West Virginia ==
West Virginia National Guard State Awards:

- West Virginia Distinguished Service Medal (WVDSM)- Honors West Virginia National Guard members who carry out feats of heroism or provide sustained exceptional service.
- West Virginia Legion of Merit (WVLOM)- Honors West Virginia National Guard members who carry out exceptional service or execute a noteworthy feat of valor.
- West Virginia Meritorious Service Medal (WVMSM)- Honors West Virginia National Guard members who carry out outstanding service or feats of heroism of a lesser degree than would warrant the West Virginia National Guard Legion of Merit.
- West Virginia Commendation Medal (WVCM)- Honors West Virginia National Guard members who carry out meritorious service of a degree greater than that required for the West Virginia National Guard Achievement Medal but of a lesser degree than would warrant the West Virginia National Guard Distinguished Service Medal.
- West Virginia Achievement Medal (WVAM)- Honors West Virginia National Guard members who carry out meritorious service of a lesser degree than would warrant the West Virginia National Guard Commendation Medal.
- West Virginia Emergency Service Ribbon (WVESR)- Honors West Virginia National Guard members who carry out service honorably in the event of an emergency or other crisis as determined by the Governor.
- West Virginia State Service Ribbon (WVSSR)- Honors West Virginia National Guard members who satisfactorily carry out active duty service.
- West Virginia Service Ribbon (WVSR)- Honors West Virginia National Guard members who carry out five years of service honorably. Additional awards are authorized for every additional five years.
- West Virginia Minuteman Ribbon (WVMR)- Honors West Virginia National Guard members who is solely responsible for the enlistment of at least five individuals over a 180-day period. At least three of these individuals must be non-prior service.
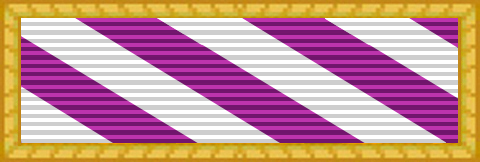
- West Virginia Distinguished Unit Award- The West Virginia Distinguished Unit Award is awarded to units or organizations, not larger than squadron or battalion, which have distinguished themselves by outstanding achievement or meritorious service in support of military operations, or in support of the state or nation, not involving combat operations against an enemy.

== Wisconsin ==
Wisconsin National Guard State Awards:

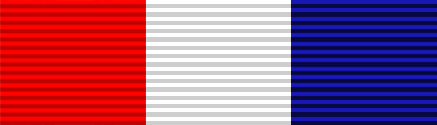
- Wisconsin Meritorious Service Medal
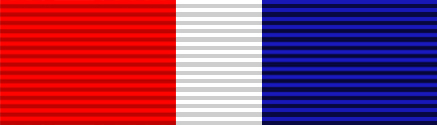
- Wisconsin Meritorious Service Ribbon
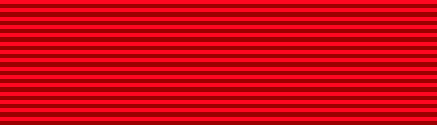
- Wisconsin Department of Military Affairs Commendation Medal
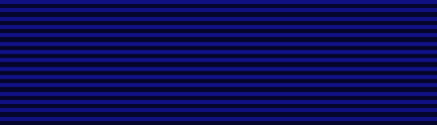
- Wisconsin Distinguished Service Medal
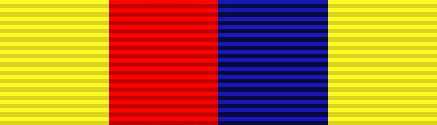
- Wisconsin National Guard Recruiting Bar
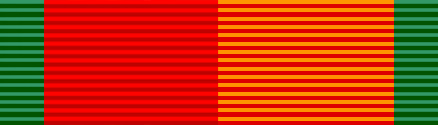
- Wisconsin National Guard Service Ribbon
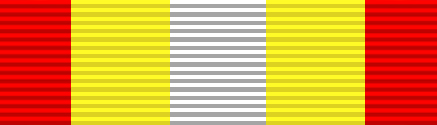
- Wisconsin National Guard Emergency Service Ribbon
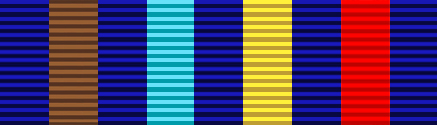
- Wisconsin National Guard Write Medal
- Wisconsin National Guard Southwest Asia Service Ribbon
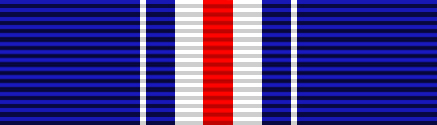
- Eisenhower Trophy Unit Citation
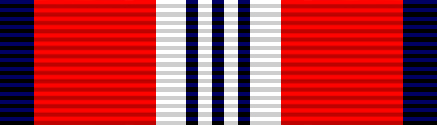
- Berlin Crisis Ribbon
- Wisconsin Wortham Achievement Service Ribbon
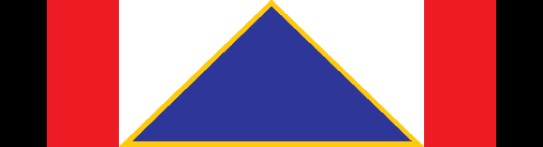
- Wisconsin Army National Guard Military Funeral Honors Service Ribbon

== Wyoming ==
Wyoming National Guard State Awards

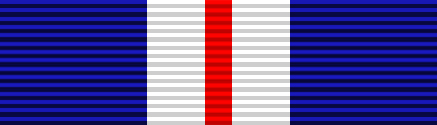
- Wyoming National Guard Association Medal for Excellence
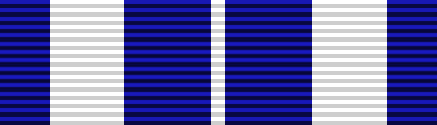
- Distinguished Service Medal
- Meritorious Achievement Medal
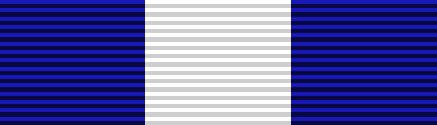
- Outstanding Service Ribbon
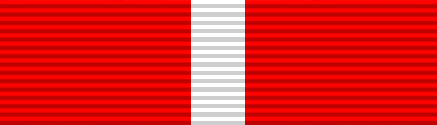
- Exceptional Achievement Ribbon
- Achievement Ribbon
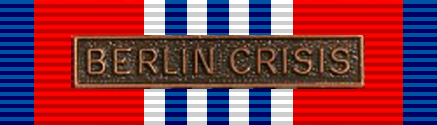
- Berlin Crisis Ribbon
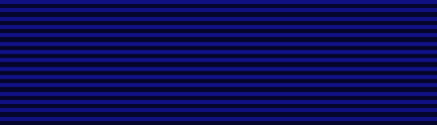
- Selected Reserve Force Ribbon
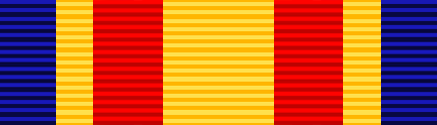
- Wyoming National Guard Service Ribbon
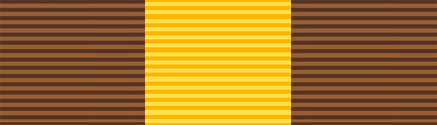
- State Active Duty Ribbon
- Wyoming National Guard Recruiting Ribbon
- Wyoming Active Duty Basic Training Ribbon

No longer authorized for wear

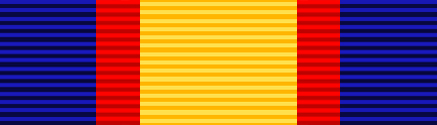
- Wyoming Air National Guard 5-year Service Medal
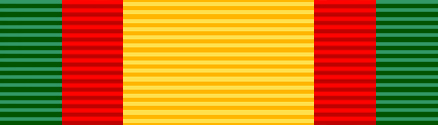
- Wyoming Air National Guard 10-year Service Medal
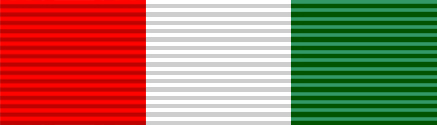
- Wyoming Philippine Campaign Medal

== See also ==
- Awards and decorations of the state defense forces
