= Maryland National Guard Overseas Service Ribbon =

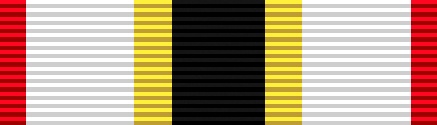

The Maryland National Guard Overseas Service Ribbon is an award in the state of Maryland bestowed upon members of the Maryland National Guard who serve outside the United States on foreign soil for at least 30 consecutive or 45 cumulative days, either for training or contingency operations.
