= Maryland National Guard Counterdrug Ribbon =

United States National Guard award

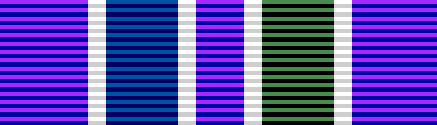

The Maryland National Guard Counterdrug Ribbon was an award given to honor individuals who serve for at least 365 cumulative days in the Maryland National Guard counterdrug program. In 2010, it was replaced by the Maryland Military Department Special Services Ribbon.
