= Maryland World War I Service Medal =

Decoration of the State of Maryland

World War I Service Medal
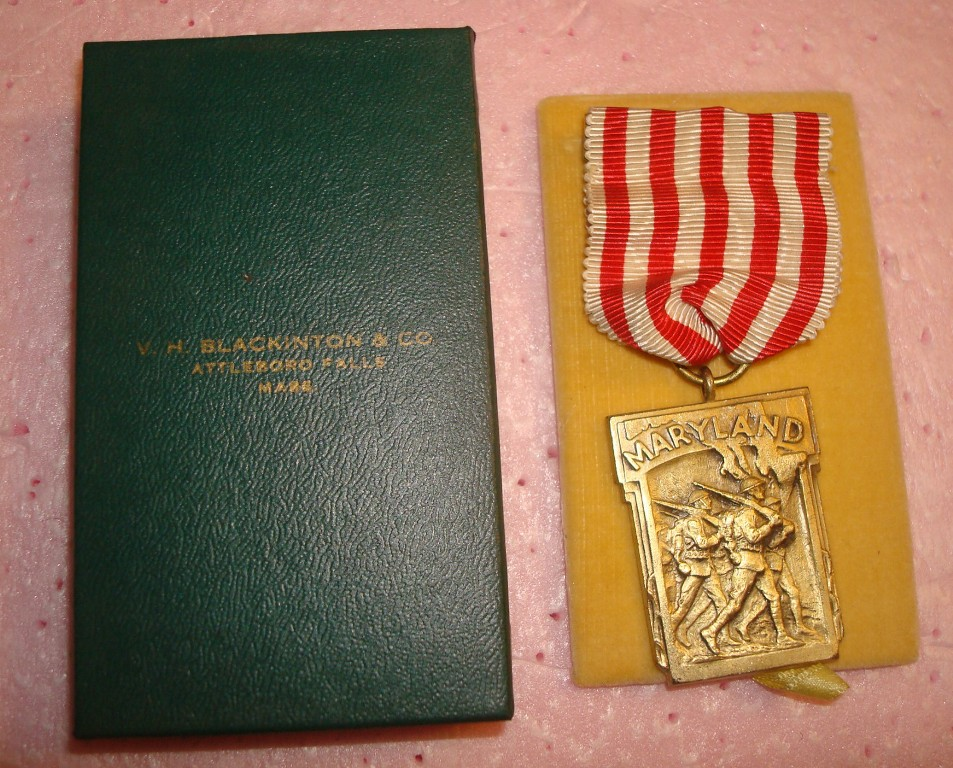
- Type: Medal
- Description: Obverse: Shows a group of soldiers with shouldered rifles under an arched roof with the inscription "Maryland". Reverse: Inscribed with the text "For Service to State & Nation in the World War" with the dates 1917-1919 below. Ribbon: The ribbon consists of red and white stripes.
- Presented by: State of Maryland
- Eligibility: Military personnel only
- Status: Obsolete
- Established: April 13, 1922; 103 years ago
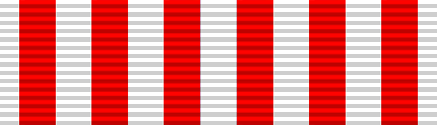
- Service ribbon

The World War I Service Medal was authorized for issue to citizens of Maryland who volunteered for and served in either the Army or Navy of the United States during World War I. The state legislature authorized such service medals on April 13, 1922.

== Design ==
Made by V.H. Blackinton Co. Bronze gilt. Marching soldiers with rifles at shoulder arms, framed in a portal with a slightly arched roof containing an outline of the state of Maryland, over which appears the word "Maryland." Reverse "For Service to State & Nation in the World War 1917-1919." Ribbon six white and five red alternating stripes.
