= Maryland Medal for Valor =

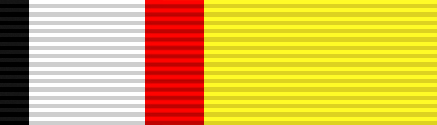

The Maryland Medal for Valor (MMV) was an award bestowed on active members of the Maryland National Guard who demonstrated remarkable, voluntary acts of heroism which placed the member in personal danger and which went above and beyond the call of duty. The act may or may not have been performed during duty hours. In 2010, the Medal was replaced with the Maryland Distinguished Service Cross with an added device to indicate valor. Former recipients are entitled to continue to display the original medal or to request conversion.
