= Awards and decorations of the Illinois National Guard =

Awards and decorations of the Illinois National Guard are provided to honor the service and dedication of the men and women who serve in the Illinois Army National Guard and the Illinois Air National Guard.

The current order of precedence for Illinois National Guard awards is found in NGIL 600-8-22 (3 Sept 2010). The following list represents the appropriate order of precedence for Illinois awards. This applies to service members of both the Army and Air National Guard.

1. Illinois Military Medal for Valor

2. Illinois Military Distinguished Service Medal

3. Illinois Military Medal for Merit

4. Illinois Cross Medal (pending)

5. Abraham Lincoln Medal of Freedom

6. Illinois Long and Honorable Military Service Medal

7. Illinois Recruiting Ribbon

8. Illinois Military Attendance Ribbon

9. Illinois State Active Duty Ribbon

10. Illinois Outstanding Service Award

11. Illinois Distinguished Service Award

== Illinois Military Medal of Valor ==
The Illinois Military Medal of Valor was established by the Adjutant General of Illinois on 1 May 1978. The Illinois Military Medal of Valor is awarded to those members of the Illinois National Guard who distinguish themselves by a conspicuous act of courage and valor. The act may have been performed either in a military or non-military status.

The deed or act performed must be one that displays personal bravery or self-sacrifice above and beyond the call of duty so conspicuous as to clearly distinguish the individual for gallantry above the individual's comrades, and must involve personal risk of life or performance of more than ordinarily hazardous service. Incontestable proof of the act or deed is required. Each recommendation for the award of this decoration will be considered on the standard of extraordinary effort.

The decoration consists of a medal set that is silver. The front has the State of Illinois, polished smoothly and with a “V” centered thereon, placed upon a muted field that is encircled by a rope-like border. The reverse side is plain. An appropriate ribbon is authorized for issue to each individual receiving the award of a medal for wear on the military uniform. The ribbon is white (3/16”), red (5/16”), blue (3/8”), red (5/16”), and white (3/16”). Second and subsequent awards are denoted by oak leaf clusters.

== Illinois Military Distinguished Service Medal ==
The Illinois Military Distinguished Service Medal was established by the Adjutant General of Illinois on 21 April 1937. The Illinois Military Distinguished Service Medal is awarded to personnel who, while serving in any capacity, distinguish themselves by exceptionally meritorious service to the State of Illinois in the performance of duty of great responsibility, or who distinguish themselves by acts of heroism beyond the call of duty as described above to a lesser degree than required for the Illinois Medal of Valor.

In order to justify award of this medal, the individual must perform, while on duty, a deed involving self-sacrifice above and beyond the call of duty, or exercise exceptional judgment so conspicuous as to clearly distinguish that individual from the individual's comrades in the performance of more than ordinary service; the omission of which would not justly subject the individual to censure for failure.

The decoration consists of a medal set that is bronze gilt. The award depicts the head of Abraham Lincoln in profile and facing left, encircled by a border formed of two concentric circles, the innermost being studded with 13 equally-spaced stars. Within this border is the inscription “Distinguished Service” (above) and “State of Illinois” (below). On the reverse side is a completely closed laurel wreath near the edge, within which are the words “Awarded to:” (above) with space for the individual's name to be imprinted below. An appropriate ribbon is authorized for issue to each individual receiving the award of a medal for wear on the military uniform. The ribbon is golden yellow (3/8”), navy blue (5/8”), and golden yellow (3/8”). Second and subsequent awards are denoted by oak leaf clusters.

== Illinois Military Medal of Merit ==
The Illinois Military Medal of Merit was established by the Adjutant General of Illinois on 1 May 1978. The Illinois Military Medal of Merit may be awarded to persons who distinguish themselves by exceptionally meritorious service to the State of Illinois.

Superior performance of duty alone will not justify the award of this decoration. The service performed must be clearly outstanding and unmistakably exceptional when compared to the achievement of individuals of like rank and responsibilities.

The decoration consists of a medal set that is bronze. On the front is the State of Illinois, polished smoothly and with a “M” centered thereon, placed upon a muted field that is encircled by a rope-like border. The reverse side is smooth. An appropriate ribbon is authorized for issue to each individual receiving the award of a medal for wear on the military uniform. The ribbon is red (1/8”), white (1/4”), olive green (5/8”), white (1/4”), and red (1/8”). Second and subsequent awards are denoted by oak leaf clusters.

== Illinois Military Long and Honorable Service Medal ==
The Illinois Military Long and Honorable Service Medal is awarded by the State of Illinois to the Army and Air National Guard members assigned to the Illinois Military Department for 5 consecutive years of honorable service. Subsequent awards are denoted by bronze Oak Leaf Clusters.

== Illinois Military Attendance Ribbon ==
The Illinois Military Attendance Ribbon is awarded by the State of Illinois to the Army and Air National Guard members assigned to the Illinois Military Department for 2 years of attendance for Drill, Annual Training and other duties as determined by the Adjutant General. Member must have attended at least 75% of scheduled UTA training as well as Annual Training for the timeframe awarded.

The ribbon denotes the first award and numerals starting with the numeral 2 denote the number of additional awards.

The Illinois Military Attendance Ribbon is white (1/16”), red (1/16”), white (1/16”), red (1/16”), white (1/16”), red (1/16”), white (5/8”), red (1/16”), white (1/16”), red (1/16”), and white (1/16”).

== Illinois State Active Duty Service Ribbon ==
The Illinois State Active Duty Service Ribbon is awarded by the State of Illinois to the Army and Air National Guard members assigned to the Illinois Military Department for state activation and mobilization.

The Illinois State Active Duty Ribbon was authorized by executive order of the Governor of Illinois on 2 July 1923, General Order 17. It is awarded for service in a State Active Duty status, other than for training, trauma, or ceremony support. Service in any declared state emergency will only be credited once even though the service member may have been on duty multiple times during the same declared emergency. Under certain circumstances, this ribbon may be awarded to members performing service under Title 32 USC 502(f)(2)(a), Full-time National Guard Duty, subject to Adjutant General approval.

A State Active Duty Service Roll is established at the State headquarters level and contains the names of all personnel who participated in the service under the executive order of the Governor, Commander-in-Chief of State Active Duty operations within the state of Illinois. The Adjutant General is the final approval authority for the award of the Illinois State Active Duty Ribbon.

An Arabic numeral will be issued for the second and succeeding awards. The ribbon denotes the first award and numerals starting with the numeral 2 denote the number of additional awards.

The Illinois State Active Duty Ribbon consists of a ribbon bar that is blue (1/4”), bronze (7/8”), and blue (1/4”).
