= Mississippi Medal of Efficiency =

- Type: Medal
- Awarded for: exemplary behavior, efficiency, and loyalty to his unit and the Mississippi National Guard.
- Country: United States of America
- Presented by: the Mississippi National Guard
- Eligibility: Members of the Mississippi National Guard who have served for five years
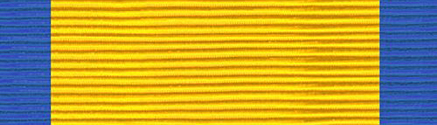
- Mississippi Medal of Efficiency ribbon

Precedence
- Next (lower): Mississippi War Medal

The Mississippi Medal of Efficiency is an award of the state of Mississippi given to member of the Mississippi National Guard.

Will be awarded to such enlisted men of the federally recognized units of the active Mississippi National Guard who have over five (5) years honorable service in the active Mississippi National Guard and have exhibited exemplary behavior, efficiency and loyalty to his unit and the Mississippi National Guard.
