= James A. Adkins =

United States Army general

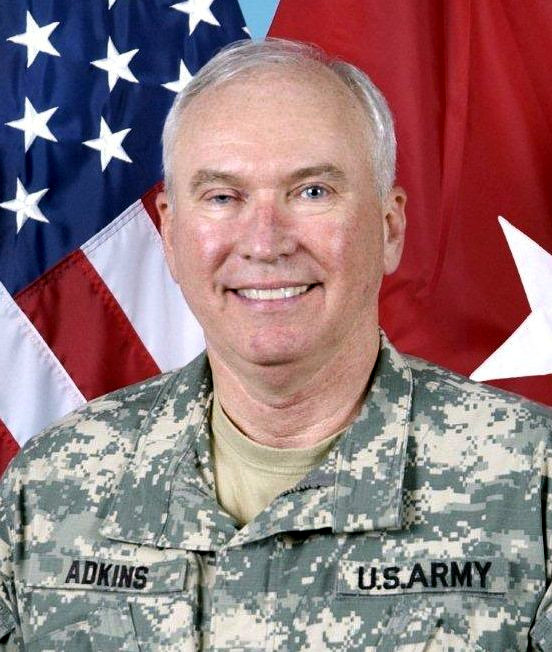
- Born: 1954 (age 71–72); Cambridge, Maryland, U.S.
- Education: University at Albany, SUNY (BA); Washington College (MA); United States Army Command and General Staff College; United States Army War College
- Military career
- Allegiance: Maryland
- Branch: United States Army
- Service years: 1979–present
- Rank: Major General

James A. Adkins (born 1954) is an American retired senior military officer and former cabinet-level official who served the adjutant general of Maryland and secretary of the Maryland Department of Veterans Affairs.

== Early life and education ==
Adkins was born in 1954 in Cambridge, Maryland, and grew up on the Eastern Shore of Maryland. He earned a Bachelor of Arts degree in sociology from the University at Albany, SUNY and a Master of Arts degree history from Washington College. His senior military education included the United States Army Command and General Staff College, United States Army War College.

== Career ==
Prior to entering the United States Army, he served two years with the Dorchester County Sheriff's Office.

His military career spanned nearly 40 years of service in both the enlisted and officer ranks. He served at nearly every level of command and in various staff assignments. Adkins graduated from the Defense Language Institute's Russian Language Program in Monterey, California, and served in intelligence, infantry, and cavalry assignments in the United States and abroad. After the collapse of the Soviet Union, he assisted the Republic of Estonia in its integration into NATO. His military career took him to Japan, Germany, Estonia, Bosnia and Herzegovina, Kosovo, Kuwait, Qatar, Iraq, Egypt and Afghanistan.

Adkins' military decorations include the Distinguished Service Medal, the Legion of Merit, the Maryland Distinguished Service Cross, the Republic of Estonia's Order of the Cross of the Eagle 2nd Class and the Order of the White Cross.

Adkins was awarded an honorary doctorate by the American University in Bosnia and Herzegovina in recognition of his service to that country.

In 2016, he was selected for induction into the Defense Language Institute's Hall of Fame in Monterey, California. Adkins was inducted into the Maryland State Firemen's Association Hall of Fame in 2014. The Daughters of the American Revolution in 2020 presented General Adkins with their highest award for native-born Americans, the DAR Medal of Honor.

He is a member of numerous organizations including the American Legion, Veterans of Foreign Wars, Disabled American Veterans, American Veterans (AMVETS), Vietnam Veterans of America, Military Officers Association of America, U.S. Army War College Foundation and Alumni Affairs, U.S. Naval Institute, U.S. Naval Academy Alumni Association and Foundation, 2nd Armored Division Association, 29th Infantry Division Association, Jamestowne Society, National Society Sons of the American Revolution, Society of the War of 1812, Rotary Club of Cambridge, and the Maryland Chiefs of Police Association. Adkins served as the President, Maryland Society of the Sons of the American Revolution from 2018 to 2019.

== Personal ==
In the 2024 United States presidential election, Adkins endorsed Kamala Harris.

== Major awards and decorations ==
- Distinguished Service Medal
- Legion of Merit
- Meritorious Service Medal (with 1 bronze oak leaf cluster)
- Army Commendation Medal (with 2 bronze oak leaf clusters)
- Army Achievement Medal
- Army Good Conduct Medal
- Army Reserve Component Achievement Medal (with 4 bronze oak leaf clusters)
- National Defense Service Medal (with one bronze service star)
- Armed Forces Reserve Medal (with bronze hourglass device)
- Army Service Ribbon
- State of Maryland Distinguished Service Cross (with 1 bronze oak leaf cluster)
- State of Maryland Meritorious Service Medal
- State of Maryland Commendation Medal
- Maryland National Guard Recruiting Medal
- Maryland National Guard State Service Medal (with two bronze botonees)
- Virginia National Guard Bronze Star Medal
- State of North Carolina Distinguished Service Medal
- SAR Military Service Medal
- SAR Silver Good Citizenship Award
- SAR Patriot Medal
- SAR State Medal of Distinguished Service
- SAR State Meritorious Service Medal
- SAR State Roger Sherman Commendation Medal
- Maryland SAR Maryland 400 Distinguished Service Medal
- Certificate of Congressional Recognition

== Other achievements ==
- Order of the Cross of the Eagle 2nd Class from the President of the Republic of Estonia
- White Cross Order of the Home Guard-Republic of Estonia
- Presentation Pistol from the Presidency of Bosnia and Herzegovina
- Honorary Doctorate from the American University in Bosnia and Herzegovina
- The Ambassador's Award for International Cooperation presented by US Ambassador to Estonia
- Hall of Fame Award, Maryland State Firemen's Association
- Jeffries Carey National Achievement Award, African American Patriots Consortium
- American Flag Foundation's Patriotism Award
- PNC A. Leo Anderson Memorial Free State Award of Excellence by AMVETS, Maryland
- Superintendent's Salute, Maryland State Police
- Hall of Fame, Defense Language Institute
- Outstanding Military Service Award, Advisory Council for Bosnia and Herzegovina
- Seven Seals Award, Department of Defense Employer Support of the Guard and Reserve
- President, Maryland Society of the Sons of the American Revolution - 2018
- Awarded a certificate of completion for the General and Flag Officer Homeland Security Executive Seminar Program, April 2012, John F. Kennedy School of Government at Harvard University, Executive Education.

== See also ==
A History of the Adjutants General of Maryland

Military offices
Preceded by Maj. Gen. Bruce F. Tuxill	Adjutant General of Maryland; 2008 – 2015	Succeeded by Maj. Gen. Linda L. Singh
