= Linda L. Singh =

Adjutant General of the Maryland National Guard

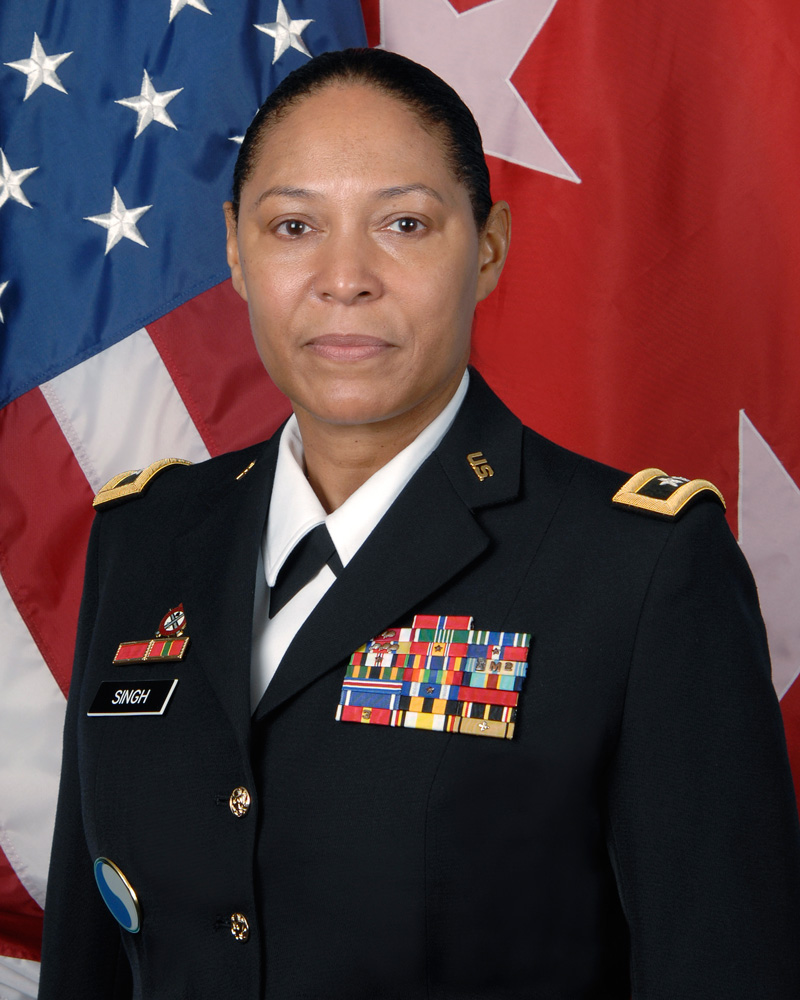
- Born: United States
- Military career
- Allegiance: State of Maryland
- Branch: United States Army
- Service years: 1981–2019
- Rank: Major general

Linda L. Singh is an American retired major general of the Maryland Army National Guard.

She was appointed as the 29th adjutant general of Maryland effective January 21, 2015, responsible for the daily operations of the Maryland Military Department, which includes the Maryland Army National Guard, Maryland Air National Guard, Maryland Emergency Management Agency, and Maryland Defense Force. She was a senior advisor to the Governor of Maryland, and was responsible for the readiness, administration, and training of more than 6,700 members of the Military Department. As the adjutant general, she served as the official channel of communication between the governor and the National Guard Bureau and served as a member of the governor's cabinet. She retired on September 15, 2019.

== Military ==
Singh received her commission in 1991 through the Maryland Military Academy's Officer Candidate School in Reisterstown, Maryland. Her military career spans more than 30 years of service in both the enlisted and officer ranks. She has served at many levels of command and in various staff assignments, two of which were overseas deployments to Kosovo and a combat tour to Afghanistan supporting Operation Enduring Freedom. Her previous military assignments include Commander of the Maryland Army National Guard and Director of the Joint Staff.

As Commander of the Maryland National Guard, Singh was a leader in responding to and controlling the 2015 Baltimore riots.

=== Assignments ===
- From 1981 – October 1991 – Enlisted member of the Maryland Army National Guard
- December 1991 – October 1992 – Maintenance Control Officer, Headquarters & Maintenance Support Battalion, 729th Forward Support Battalion, Hagerstown, Maryland
- November 1992 – November 1995 – Maintenance Officer/Executive Officer, B Co., 229th Main Support Battalion, Reisterstown, Maryland
- November 1995 – November 1997 – Commander, B Co., 229th Main Support Battalion, Reisterstown, Maryland
- November 1997 – September 1999 – S-4, Headquarters & A Co., 229th Main Support Battalion Reisterstown, Maryland
- October 1999 – August 2001 – Material Management Officer, Headquarters & Headquarters Company, 29th Division Support
- August 2001 – October 2002 – Support Operations Officer, Headquarters & A Co., 229th Main Support Battalion, Reisterstown, Maryland
- November 2002 – April 2004 – Battalion Commander, 581st Readiness Battalion, Glen Arm, MD
- May 2004 – January 2006 – Battalion Commander, 229th Main Support Battalion, Reisterstown, Maryland
- January 2006 – September 2009 – Assistant Chief of Staff, G-4, Detachment 1, Headquarters & Headquarters Company, 29th Infantry Division, Towson, Maryland
- October 2009 – June 2011 – Regimental Commander, Headquarters 70th Regiment (LDR), Reisterstown, Maryland
- June 2011 – July 2012 – Chief Current Operations, Afghanistan National Security Forces, 29th Infantry Division Headquarters, FWD 3, Towson, Maryland
- August 2012 – July 2013 – Director of the Joint Staff, Maryland National Guard, Reisterstown, Maryland
- August 2013 – January 2015 – Commander of the Maryland Army National Guard, Baltimore, Maryland
- January 2015 – September, 2019 – The Adjutant General, Joint Force Headquarters, Maryland National Guard, Baltimore, Maryland

=== Awards and decorations ===
- Legion of Merit
- Bronze Star Medal
- Meritorious Service Medal (with 2 bronze oak leaf clusters)
- Army Commendation Medal
- Army Achievement Medal
- Army Reserve Component Achievement Medal (with 1 silver and 2 bronze oak leaf clusters)
- National Defense Service Medal (with one bronze service star)
- Kosovo Campaign Medal
- Afghanistan Campaign Medal
- Global War on Terrorism Service Medal
- Armed Forces Reserve Medal (with Silver Hourglass Device and M Device)
- Army Superior Unit Award
- NCO Professional Development Ribbon
- Army Service Ribbon
- Overseas Service Ribbon
- Army Reserve Components Overseas Training Ribbon (with Numeral 2)
- State of Maryland Distinguished Service Cross
- State of Maryland Meritorious Service Medal
- Maryland National Guard State Service Medal (with Silver Botonee Cross)
- Maryland National Guard Recruiting Medal
- Virginia National Guard Bronze Star Medal

== Personal life ==
Singh grew up in Frederick County, Md., and is a long time Maryland resident of Prince George's County where she currently resides with her husband and two daughters. She retired as managing director in Accenture's Health and Public Service North America operating unit in May 2016. Her responsibilities included managing all operational activities including the financials, strategic business plans, quality programs, program delivery programs, human resource management, business approvals, internal controls and sales activities for a budget that exceeded $3 billion. She managed a global team in order to leverage capabilities from Accenture's global public service business as well as external partnering relationships. She previously served as the Commercial Director for the Public Safety Portfolio, the account lead for the Veterans Affairs and the account lead for the Army.

== See also ==
- A History of the Adjutants General of Maryland

Military offices
Preceded by Maj. Gen. James A. Adkins	Adjutant General of Maryland; 2015 – present	Succeeded by Maj. Gen. Timothy E. Gowen
