= Charles Whittington =

American general

Charles W. Whittington, Jr.
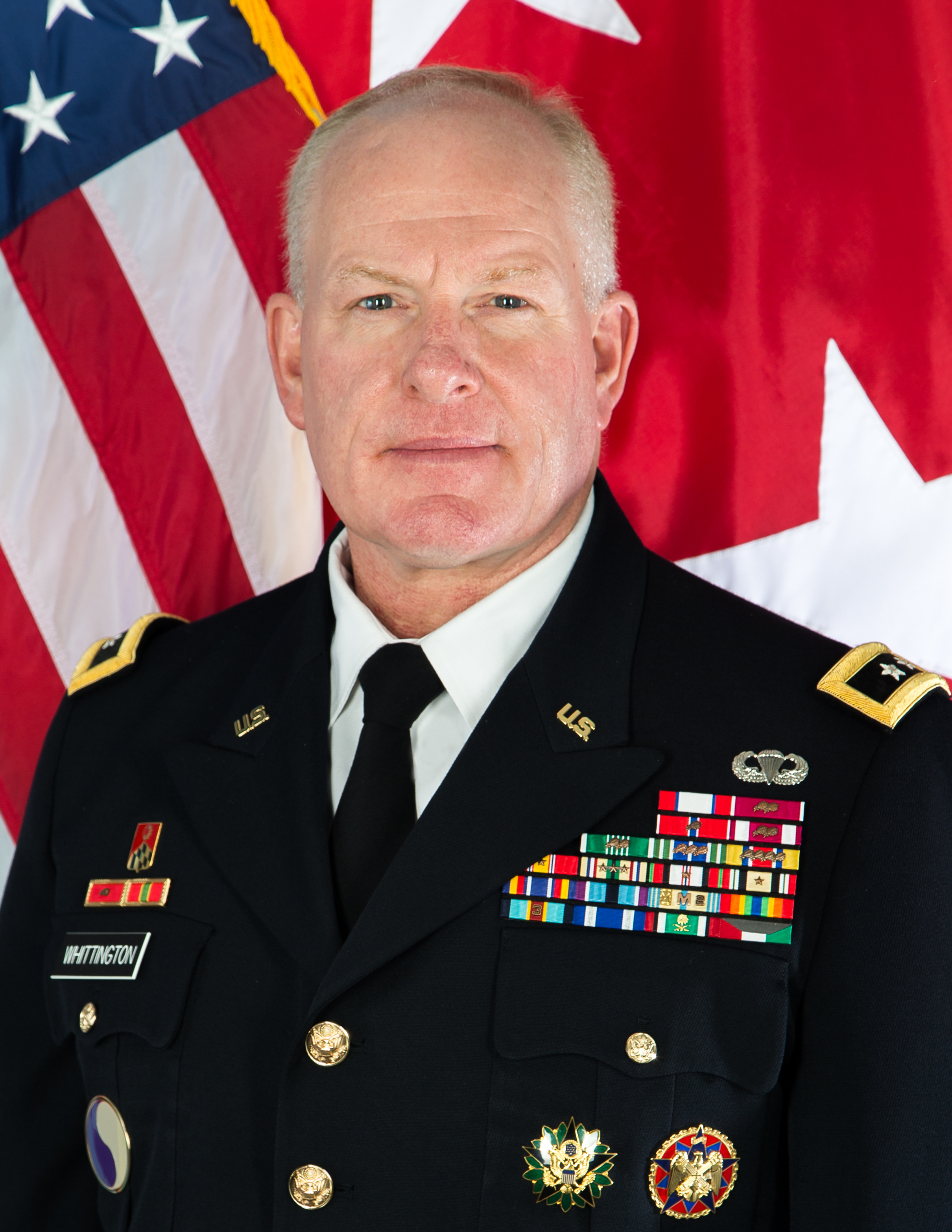
- Charles W. Whittington, Jr.
- Military career
- Allegiance: United States of America
- Branch: United States Army
- Service years: 1986–2019
- Rank: Major general
- Unit: 29th Infantry Division
- Commands: 29th Infantry Division; 58th Infantry Brigade Combat Team; 2nd Battalion, 110th Field Artillery Regiment
- Awards: Army Distinguished Service Medal; Legion of Merit (3); Bronze Star Medal (2)

Charles W. Whittington, Jr. was a major general in the United States Army. As of July 2018, he was serving as deputy director of the United States Army National Guard. Whittington previously served as the First Army deputy commanding general-operations.

== Early life and education ==
Whittington is a native of Birmingham, Alabama. He graduated from the University of Southern Mississippi in 1986 with a BS degree in political science. He joined Tau Kappa Epsilon during his time at Southern Mississippi. Whittington was commissioned via ROTC in December 1986 as a field artillery officer. Whittington later received a master of strategic studies degree from the United States Army War College.

== Military career ==
General Whittington began his military service when he was commissioned in December 1986 as an artillery officer in the Regular Army, through the University of Southern Mississippi, Reserve Officer Training Corps.

After commissioning, he served in Germany and as a field artillery instructor at Fort Sill, Oklahoma. During Operation Desert Storm, he served in Kuwait and Iraq as a battery executive officer. Since joining the Maryland National Guard in 1993, he has commanded and held staff assignments at the battery, battalion and brigade levels.

In March 2007, Whittington deployed to Camp Victory, Iraq as deputy commander, 58th Infantry Brigade Combat Team. In June 2008, he assumed command of the 58th Infantry Brigade Combat Team and oversaw the Brigade's transformation into the 58th Battlefield Surveillance Brigade. General Whittington served as deputy commander, 29th Infantry Division in June 2010. He served in Kabul, Afghanistan as director, Afghan National Security Forces Development/ International Security Assistance Force from September 2011 to July 2012. He led a joint multicultural team tasked with developing and implementing key initiatives to facilitate the growth and development of the Afghan National Security Forces.

Whittington was named First Army deputy commanding general for operations on Aug. 26, 2015. He assumed the post of deputy director of the U.S. Army National Guard on July 1, 2018.

== Civilian career ==
He is currently Senior Vice President, Integration for Pactiv Corporation in Lake Forest, Illinois.

== Assignments ==
1. October 1987 – March 1988, student, Field Artillery School, Fort Sill, Oklahoma
2. March 1988 – December 1988, company fire support officer, 4–67 Armor, Ray Barracks, Friedburg, Germany
3. December 1988 – December 1989, executive officer, Service Battery, 2-82d Field Artillery A (155SP), Ray Barracks, Friedburg, Germany
4. December 1989 – September 1990, adjutant, 2-82d Field Artillery Battalion, Ray Barracks, Friedburg, Germany
5. September 1990 – July 1991, executive officer, Battery A, 2-82d Field Artillery, Basara, Iraq
6. July 1991 – September 1992, instructor, Field Artillery School, Fort Sill, Oklahoma
7. September 1992 – October 1993, United States Army Reserve Control Group
8. October 1993 – January 1995, brigade targeting officer, 2–110 Field Artillery Battalion, Pikesville, Maryland
9. January 1995 – November 1997, commander, Battery B / 2-110 Field Artillery Battalion, Pikesville, Maryland
10. November 1997 – July 1998, plans officer, 2–110 Field Artillery Battalion, Pikesville
11. July 1998 – January 2002, operations officer, 2–110 Field Artillery Battalion, Pikesville, Maryland
12. January 2002 – August 2003, executive officer, 2–110 Field Artillery Battalion, Pikesville, Maryland
13. August 2003 – April 2006, commander, 2–110 Field Artillery Battalion, Pikesville, Maryland
14. April 2006 to March 2007, commander, 291 Army Liaison Team, Laurel, Maryland
15. March 2007 – May 2008, deputy commander, 58th Infantry Brigade Combat Team, Camp Victory, Iraq
16. June 2008 – June 2010, commander, 58th Infantry Brigade Combat Team, Towson, Maryland
17. June 2010 – September 2012, deputy commander, 29th Infantry Division, Towson, Maryland
18. October 2012 – August 2015, commander, 29th Infantry Division, Fort Belvoir, Virginia
19. August 2015 – July 2018, deputy commanding general (RC), First United States Army, Rock Island, Illinois
20. July 2018 – February 2019, deputy director, Army National Guard, Arlington, Virginia
21. March 2019 – June 2019, acting director, Army National Guard
22. June 2019 – July 2019, deputy director, Army National Guard, Arlington, Virginia

== Awards and decorations ==
Whittington's awards and decorations include:

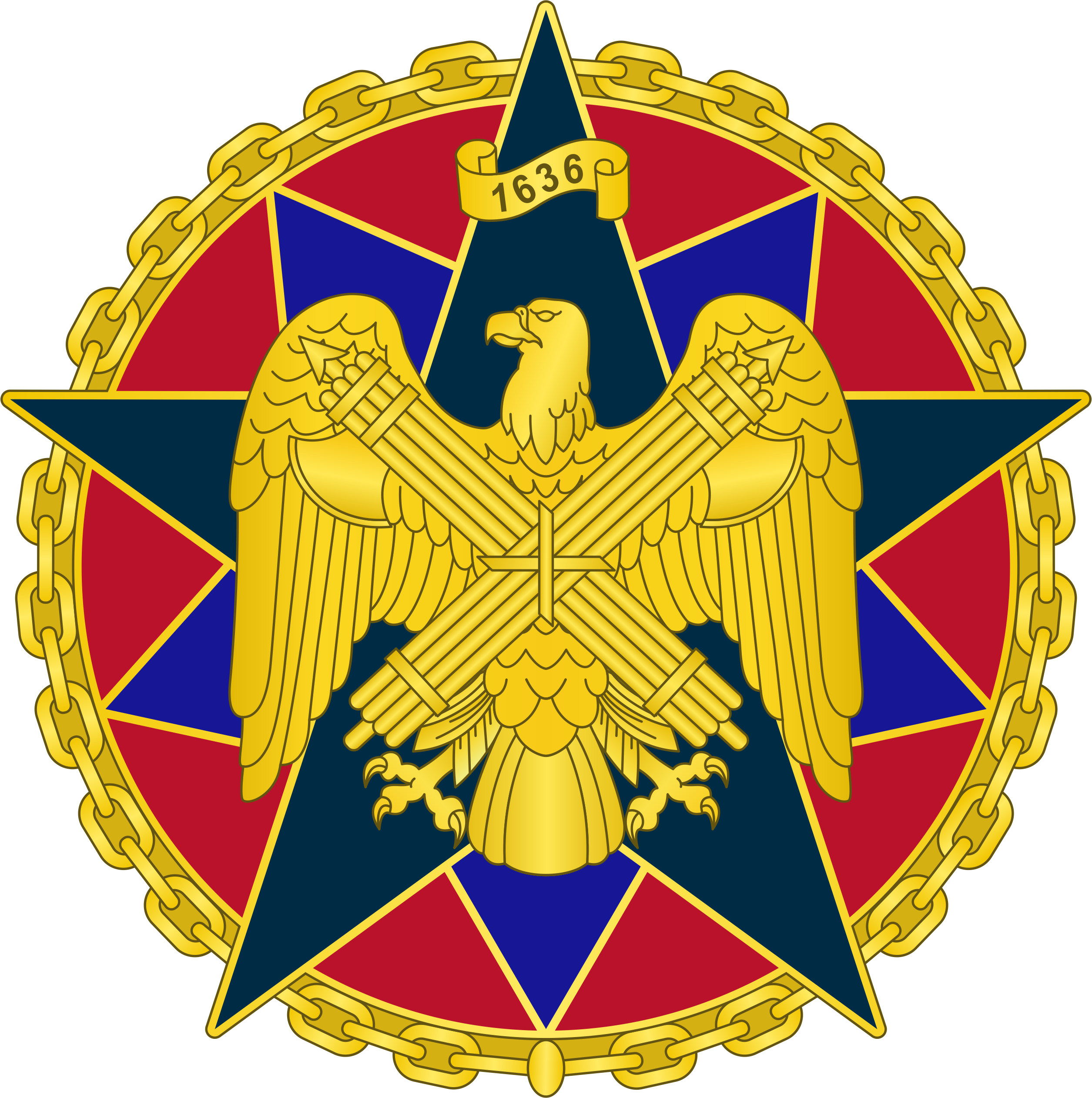
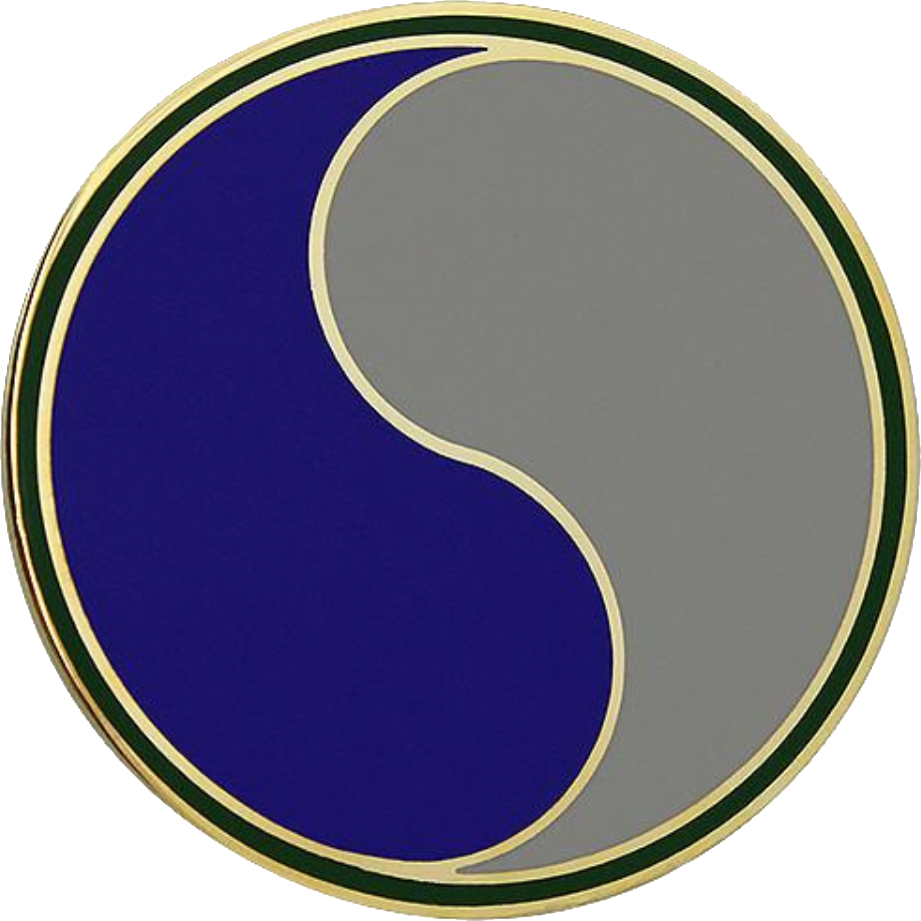
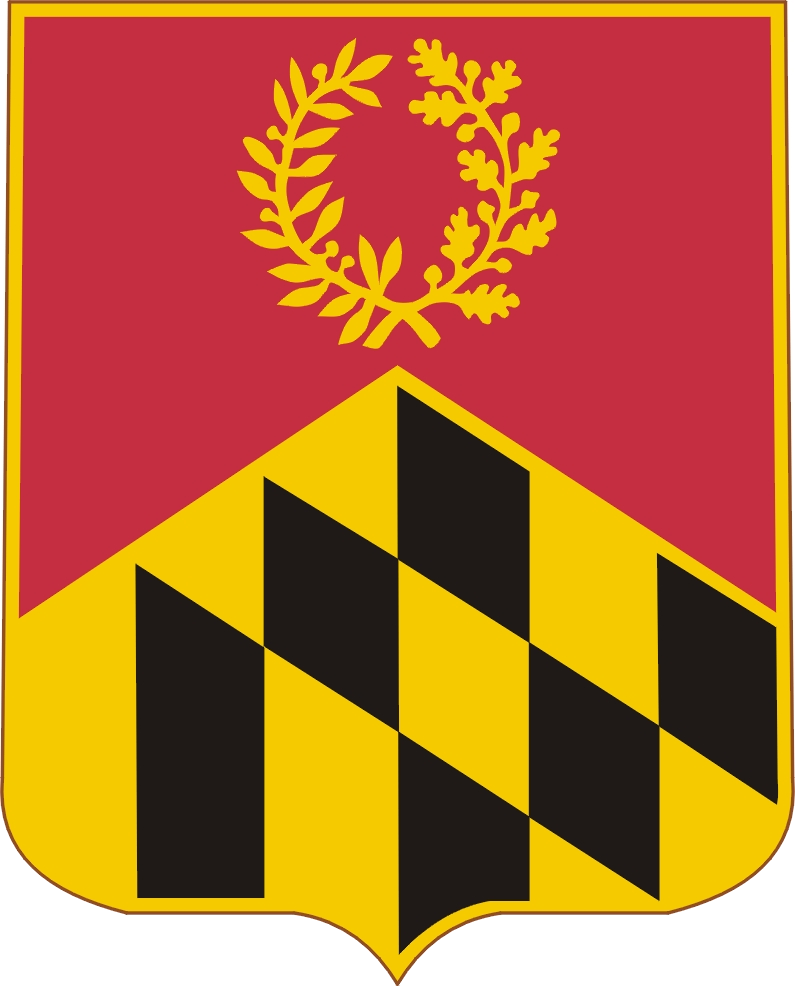
| Basic Parachutist Badge |
| National Guard Bureau Organizational Badge |
| Army Staff Identification Badge |
| 29th Infantry Regiment Combat Service Identification Badge |
| 110th Field Artillery Regiment Distinctive Unit Insignia |
| 4 Overseas Service Bars |

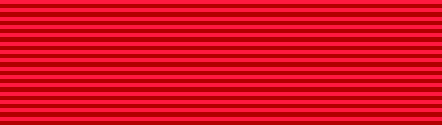
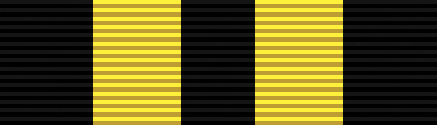
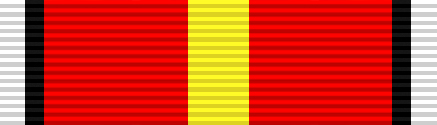
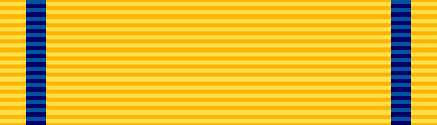
| Army Distinguished Service Medal |
| Legion of Merit with three bronze oak leaf clusters |
| Bronze Star Medal with oak leaf cluster |
| Meritorious Service Medal with two oak leaf clusters |
| Army Commendation Medal with two oak leaf clusters |
| Army Achievement Medal with three oak leaf clusters |
| Army Meritorious Unit Commendation with oak leaf cluster |
| Superior Unit Award |
| Army Reserve Component Achievement Medal with four oak leaf clusters |
| National Defense Service Medal with one bronze service star |
| Southwest Asia Service Medal with three service stars |
| Afghanistan Campaign Medal with service star |
| Iraq Campaign Medal with service star |
| Global War on Terrorism Service Medal |
| Humanitarian Service Medal |
| Armed Forces Reserve Medal with gold Hourglass device, "M" device and bronze award numeral 2 |
| Army Service Ribbon |
| Army Overseas Service Ribbon with bronze award numeral 3 |
| NATO Medal for service with ISAF |
| Kuwait Liberation Medal (Saudi Arabia) |
| Kuwait Liberation Medal (Kuwait) |
| State of Maryland Distinguished Service Cross |
| Maryland Outstanding Unit Ribbon |
| Unidentified ribbon |
| Maryland Military Department Emergency Service Medal |
| State of Maryland State Service Medal with two bottony devices |

== Effective dates of promotion ==
- Second lieutenant 19 December 1986
- First lieutenant 19 December 1988
- Captain 1 May 1992
- Major 26 October 1993
- Lieutenant colonel 5 November 2003
- Colonel 29 March 2007
- Brigadier general 1 October 2010
- Major general 7 October 2012
