= Milton Reckord =

United States Army general

Milton Atchison Reckord
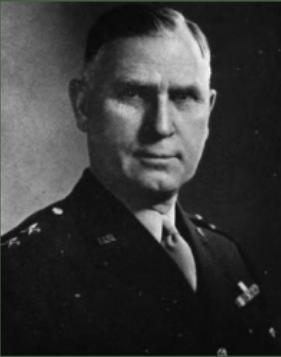
- Reckord as a Major General
- Born: December 28, 1879; Harford County, Maryland
- Died: September 8, 1975 (aged 95); Fort Howard, Maryland
- Military career
- Allegiance: United States of America
- Branch: United States Army
- Service years: 1901–1920, 1941–1945 (US Army); 1920–1941, 1945–1966 (National Guard)
- Rank: Major General (Army); Lieutenant General (National Guard)
- Commands: Maryland National Guard; 29th Infantry Division; 58th Infantry Brigade
- Conflicts: Pancho Villa Expedition; World War I World War II
- Awards: Army Distinguished Service Medal (4); Bronze Star Medal; Legion of Honor (Officer) (France); Croix de Guerre with palm (France) (World War I); Croix de Guerre with palm (France) (World War II); Order of the Bath (United Kingdom) (honorary Knight Commander)

Milton Atchison Reckord (December 28, 1879 – September 8, 1975) was an officer in the Maryland Army National Guard and United States Army. The longtime Adjutant General of Maryland, he was a veteran of the Pancho Villa Expedition, World War I, and World War II. Reckord attained the rank of major general, and was a recipient of the Army Distinguished Service Medal (four awards) and the Bronze Star Medal. In addition, Reckord received the French Legion of Honor, the French Croix de Guerre with palm for his World War I service, the French Croix de Guerre with palm for his World War II service, the French Legion of Honor (Officer), and the British Order of the Bath (honorary Knight Commander). In 1961, Governor J. Millard Tawes conferred on Reckord a state promotion to lieutenant general, and continued serving as adjutant general until retiring in 1966.

== Early life ==
Reckord was born to John and Lydia (Zimmerman) Reckord at their home in Harford County, Maryland. He commenced work at his father's milling plant in 1896 upon his graduation from Bel Air High School.

== Military career ==
Reckord expressed desire to serve in the military, but, at the request of his mother, delayed entry into service until he turned 21. He enlisted in Company D, 1st Maryland Infantry, Maryland National Guard on February 15, 1901, and would eventually rise to command the same company when he was commissioned as a captain in December 1904. As a major, in 1916, Reckord was given command of the 2nd Battalion, 1st Maryland Infantry, which deployed to the Mexican border and served in the Mexican Expedition commanded by Gen. John J. Pershing. When the 29th Infantry Division was created on the eve of World War I in 1917, Reckord was given command of one of its regiments, the 115th Infantry, which saw combat during the Meuse-Argonne Offensive. In 1920, he was appointed Adjutant General of the Maryland National Guard and, in 1934, while still serving as Maryland's Adjutant General, he assumed command of the 29th Infantry Division.

During the years between the First and Second World War, Reckord was a leading advocate for increasing the role of the National Guard in the United States' national defensive strategy. From 1923 to 1925, he served as president of the National Guard Association of the United States. In 1933, he authored legislation that permanently gave National Guard personnel status as both state and federal troops.

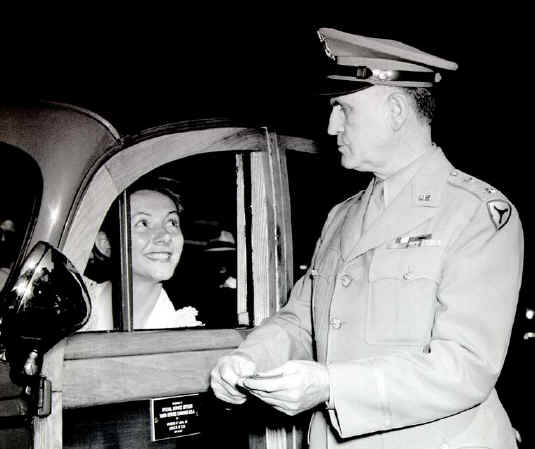
General Reckord speaks to a special services volunteer

Reckord was mobilized for World War II with the 29th Infantry Division in February 1941 and took a leave of absence from his post as Maryland's Adjutant General. Deemed by the Army to be too old to command a division in combat, he was relieved of command and assigned as the commander of the Third Corps Area. He later deployed overseas and was named Theater Provost Marshal, European Theater of Operations.

After World War II, Reckord returned to his post as the Adjutant General of Maryland. He received a state promotion to Lieutenant General from Governor J. Millard Tawes in 1961, and continued to serve as Adjutant General until his retirement in 1966.

== Death and burial ==
Record died at Fort Howard Veterans Hospital in Fort Howard, Maryland, on September 8, 1975. He was buried at Mountain Christian Church Cemetery in Joppa, Maryland.

== Family ==
In 1910, Reckord married Bessie Payne Roe. They were the parents of a daughter, Gladys Atchison Reckord. Mrs. Reckord died on January 17, 1943, and Reckord never remarried. After retiring, he resided in Ruxton, Maryland, with his daughter and her husband, H. Frederick Jones Jr.

== Memberships ==
In his military life, Reckord was a leader of the National Guard Association of the United States (NGAUS), and served as its president from 1923 to 1925. In the years after World War II, Reckord was chairman of the NGAUS Committee on Legislation, and was the first individual to be appointed a life member of the NGAUS Executive Council. He was also a member of the Adjutants General Association of the United States (AGAUS), the 29th Infantry Division Association, the Veterans of Foreign Wars, the Military Order of Foreign Wars, and the Army and Navy Club.

In his civilian life, Reckord was a member of the National Rifle Association of America (NRA) beginning in 1920, and served on the organization's Executive Council and as its executive vice president. He served as president of both the Maryland Jockey Club, which owned Pimlico Race Course, and the Hartford Agricultural and Breeders Association, which owned Havre de Grace Racetrack. In addition, he belonged to the Freemasons, Maryland Club, Baltimore Country Club, Advertising Club of Baltimore, and Racquet Club of Washington, D.C.

== Legacy ==
The Reckord Trophy is a prize awarded annually to the Army National Guard battalion(s) that achieves the highest standards of training and readiness. The Reckord Trophy is one of the highest peacetime awards given to National Guard units. The Reckord Armory at the University of Maryland is named after General Reckord.

== Honors ==
Reckord was the recipient of several honorary degrees, including: Franklin & Marshall College (LL.D., 1943); Western Maryland College (Doctor of Military Science and Tactics, 1943); the University of Maryland (LL.D., 1944); and Pennsylvania Military College (LL.D., 1944).

Reckord Armory, a recreation and athletics building on the campus of the University of Maryland, College Park, was named for Reckord in 1961.

There is also a National Guard facility in the town of Bel Air, Maryland known as Reckord Armory. No longer used for military activities, it is now a facility for public events including weddings, trade shows, and business meetings.

In 1950, Reckord was the first recipient of the National Guard Association of the United States Distinguished Service Medal. Also in 1950, Reckord received the American Legion's Distinguished Service Medal.

== Awards and medals ==
Reckford's decorations include the following:

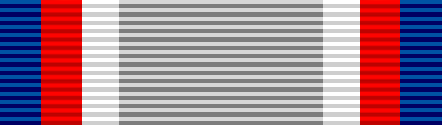

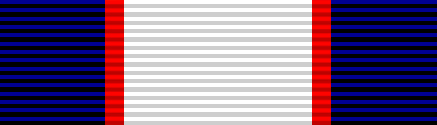

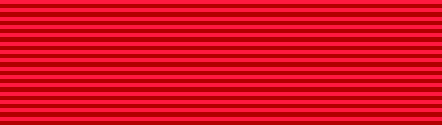

1st Row	Army Distinguished Service Medal w/ 3 Oak Leaf Clusters		Bronze Star Medal	
2nd Row	Mexican Border Service Medal	World War I Victory Medal w/ two battle clasps	American Defense Service Medal	American Campaign Medal
3rd Row	European-African-Middle Eastern Campaign Medal w/ 3 service stars	World War II Victory Medal	Army of Occupation Medal	National Defense Service Medal
4th Row	Alabama Distinguished Service Medal	Virginia Distinguished Service Medal	Pennsylvania Distinguished Service Medal	State of Maryland Distinguished Service Cross
5th Row	Knight Commander of the Order of the Bath	Officer of the Legion of Honour	French Croix de guerre 1914–1918 w/ palm	French Croix de guerre 1939–1945 w/ palm

== See also ==
- A History of the Adjutants General of Maryland

Preceded by Henry M. Warfield	Adjutant General of the state of Maryland; 1920–1966	Succeeded by George M. Gelston
