= Henry Kyd Douglas =

Adjutant General of Maryland (1838–1903)

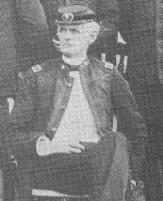
- Douglas in uniform, c. 1892

15th Adjutant General of Maryland
- In office March 3, 1892 – February 19, 1896
- Preceded by: James Howard
- Succeeded by: L. Allison Wilmer

Personal details
- Born: September 29, 1838 Shepherdstown, Virginia, U.S.
- Died: December 18, 1903 (aged 65) Hagerstown, Maryland, U.S.
- Resting place: Elmwood Cemetery, Shepherdstown
- Party: Gold Democrat
- Education: Franklin and Marshall College (AB)
- Occupation: Lawyer; Army officer; National Guard officer; memoirist

Military service
- Allegiance: Confederate States; United States
- Branch: Confederate States Army; Maryland National Guard
- Years of service: 1861–1865; 1876-1896
- Rank: Major (C.S.); Major General (Md.)
- Unit: Company B, 2d Virginia Infantry (1861–63)
- Commands: Maryland National Guard
- Battles: American Civil War; First Battle of Bull Run; First Battle of Kernstown; Battle of McDowell; Battle of Front Royal; First Battle of Winchester; Battle of Cross Keys; Battle of Port Republic; Battle of Gaines's Mill; Battle of White Oak Swamp; Battle of Malvern Hill; Battle of Cedar Mountain; Second Battle of Bull Run; Battle of Harpers Ferry; Battle of Antietam; Battle of Chancellorsville; Second Battle of Winchester; Battle of Gettysburg (WIA) (POW); Battle of the Wilderness; Battle of Spotsylvania Court House; Battle of Cold Harbor; Battle of Lynchburg; Battle of Monocacy; Battle of Fort Stevens; Second Battle of Kernstown; Third Battle of Winchester; Battle of Fisher's Hill; Battle of Cedar Creek; Battle of Hatcher's Run; Battle of Fort Stedman; Battle of Sailor's Creek; Battle of Appomattox Court House

Henry Kyd Douglas (September 29, 1838 – December 18, 1903) was an American lawyer and memoirist who was the 15th adjutant general of Maryland from 1892 to 1896. He also served as a senior officer of the Adjutant General's Corps in the Confederate States Army in the Eastern Theater of the American Civil War. Douglas is best known for his wartime memoir I Rode with Stonewall: Being Chiefly the War Experiences of the Youngest Member of Jackson's Staff from the John Brown Raid to the Hanging of Mrs. Surratt, published posthumously in 1940.

Douglas participated in most of the battles of the Second Corps, Army of Northern Virginia; serving on the staffs of Stonewall Jackson and his successors. Severely wounded on the third day of the Battle of Gettysburg, he became a prisoner of war for almost ten months. At the end of the war, he commanded a brigade at the last battle of the war. After the war he returned to his civilian occupation as a lawyer, got involved in state politics, later as a Gold Democrat, and became an officer in the Maryland National Guard, eventually holding the office of the Adjutant General of Maryland.

== Early life and education ==
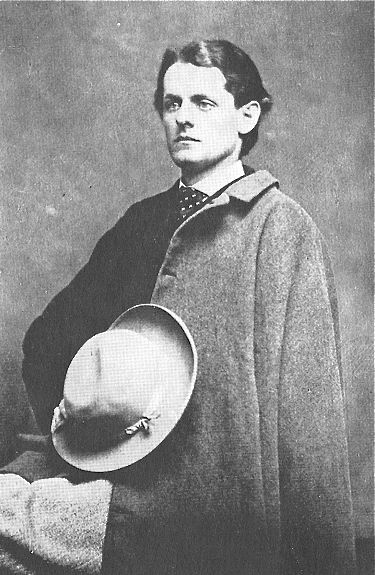
Douglas, c. 1859

Douglas was the son of the Scottish born minister, Robert Douglas and his wife Mary, born Robertson. The Reverend Douglas was a nephew of the Attorney General of Pennsylvania Samuel Douglas, and studied theology at the Theological Seminary at York, Pennsylvania, before being admitted to the ministry in the German Reformed Church. Henry Kyd Douglas grew up on Ferry Hill Place, on the opposite site of the Potomac River from Shepherdstown, Virginia, not far from Sharpsburg, Maryland. His home not being more than two miles from Harpers Ferry, he watched the storming of the engine house by the Marines that ended John Brown's raid, and later witnessed the treason trial that followed. Douglas graduated from Franklin and Marshall College in Pennsylvania 1858, studied law in Lexington, Virginia, and was admitted to the bar at Charleston, Virginia, 1860. Having moved to St. Louis, he returned to Virginia at the outbreak of the civil war.

== American Civil War ==
In April 1861, Douglas enlisted at Harpers Ferry as a private in Company B, 2d Virginia Infantry which formed part of what was later to become the "Stonewall" Brigade. The reality of war struck home when the Virginia forces retreated and he was among the men detailed to burn the bridge over the Potomac at Shepherdstown, in which his father owned stock. Douglas rose through the ranks, fighting at Bull Run as a first sergeant, and commanding his company as a lieutenant at Kernstown. In the spring of 1862 he was, through the intervention of his friend Sandie Pendleton, detailed on special duty at Stonewall Jackson's headquarters. Soon after having joined Jackson's HQ, Douglas made an extraordinary ride of 103 miles, from Mount Jackson to Brandy Station, crossing the Blue Ridge Mountains in a heavy rainstorm, with orders from Stonewall to General Ewell. As a reward for his efficient fulfillment of duty, he was, the day after his return to HQ, made assistant inspector general on Jackson's staff.

Douglas' task as inspector general was to see to the proper execution of orders and commands given. When Stonewall's men were destroying a section of the B&O railroad, it was his job to check its thorough completion; being in the saddle all day and inspecting the whole stretch to be demolished. In battle, he rode with orders and reports. At Antietam, he wore out two horses and fainted of exhaustion already at noon. A delicate task that once fell upon Douglas was when ordered to relieve General A. P. Hill from his command, due to his division's tardiness. Hill's vehement protests eventually led to his arrest by order of Stonewall. Another time, Douglas was approached by Belle Boyd, whom he knew since before the war, in the afternoon just before the battle of Front Royal, who urged him to inform General Jackson that the enemy force was very small and easy to defeat through a rapid advance.

Late in the fall of 1862, when the army was about to go into winter camp, a delegation from his old company approached Douglas and wanted him to take command of the company. After consulting with Stonewall, he accepted a commission as captain of Co. B, 2nd Virginia Vols. Soon thereafter, he also became assistant inspector general of the Stonewall Brigade, while keeping his company command. When Stonewall Jackson fell wounded at Chancellorsville, Douglas visited him and spent an hour talking about the recent battle. After Stonewall's death, Douglas accompanied Mrs. Jackson and the staff with the general's body on the train to Richmond. In the funeral procession, he sat with the other staff officers in the carriage behind Mrs. Jackson and President Jefferson Davis, and saw Stonewall's earthly remains put on lit de parade in the Confederate Capitol. When Douglas returned from Richmond, he accepted an offer from General Edward Johnson, the new commanding officer of the Stonewall Division, to be assistant adjutant general, with the rank of major, on his staff.

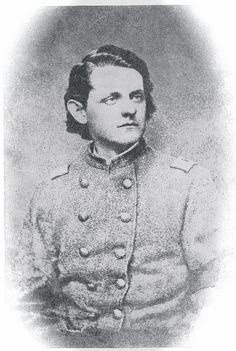
Douglas in uniform, c. 1862

On the third day of the battle of Gettysburg, Douglas was severely wounded in his left shoulder, for a time paralyzed in his left arm, while guiding Extra-Billy Smith's brigade into position during an early morning attack on Culp's Hill. He was taken several miles towards Hunterstown, and left in the house of the Henry Picking farm, that served as a Confederate field hospital, while quite a number of wounded soldiers had been left in the barn. His mother and sister, who at the news of his wounding had travelled through the lines, soon came to visit him. After a few days, a major of the 4th Pennsylvania Cavalry paroled Douglas and the soldiers in the barn. Tendered with care by the Picking family he soon could receive visits from friends he had known in college. After a fortnight, Douglas was moved to the Gettysburg Theological Seminary. His doctor there was an old college chum, Henry Leaman, and Douglas complimented the care with which he was treated. He could now walk about and visited the town in female company. In Gettysburg, Douglas remained for a month before he was taken to Baltimore hospital. As he was held as a prisoner of war, Douglas began a lengthy correspondence with the United States Army in order to convince it to honor his parole. That was denied, however, on the grounds of it being issued by an officer who had exceeded his powers. After a couple of months in Baltimore, Douglas had recovered enough to be transferred to the prison camp for Confederate officers at Johnson's Island. He found the camp cold, very cold, the food sufficient, the treatment, although not as friendly as in Baltimore, kind enough. In February 1864, Douglas was transferred to the Point Lookout prison camp in southern Maryland. Ill from the cold at Johnson's Island, he was hospitalized in the new camp.

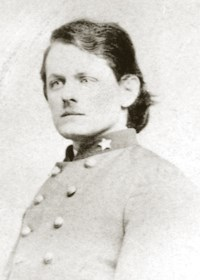
Douglas in uniform, c. 1864

At the end of March 1864, Douglas, through the intervention of General Benjamin Butler, was sent home, although not formally exchanged. On the southbound steamer were not only a number of properly exchanged officers and soldiers, but also one of President Lincoln's sisters-in-law, who returned to Alabama with a special pass from the president. On parole, Douglas could go back to the army before being formally exchanged. It was not until the first day of the battle of the Wilderness that Douglas returned to the service, as assistant adjutant general (AAG) of General Edward Johnson's division, fighting at the Wilderness and at Spotsylvania, where he managed to escape when the general and 3,000 of his men were captured. During the rest of the battle, Douglas served on General Gordon's staff, later being transferred to General Early's division as AAG. Early took command of the Second Corps, Army of Northern Virginia at Cold Harbor, taking his staff officers with him to the new command, Douglas becoming the AAG of that corps.

As the Union Army drove the Confederates up the Shenandoah Valley, General Lee, June 12, 1864, ordered Early and his corps to strike at the Union forces, proceed down the Valley and threaten Washington, with the hope of Grant diverting his forces in order to protect the capital. Outside Washington, Douglas rode by Silver Spring, Francis P. Blair's home, saw the house full of Confederate stragglers, and chased them away. It then became headquarters for Early, at least for a night. Having failed to make any permanent impression on the defenses of Washington, Early's corps returned to the Shenandoah, in order to fight Sheridan's advancing army. General John B. Gordon took command of the Second Corps, November 11, with Douglas remaining as AAG. The corps was now transferred to the trenches of Petersburg, making a failed but bloody attack on Fort Stedman, March 25. Douglas now became commander of the much depleted Walker's Brigade, which he led at Sailor's Creek and at the last battle of the civil war in Virginia, at Appomattox Court House, and at the final surrender.

== Later life ==
Immediately after he had returned from the American Civil War, Douglas ran into trouble with the United States military authorities. He was arrested and sentenced to three months in prison, because he was photographed in his confederate uniform. The negative was confiscated by Captain Seidenstricker of the Union Army and was not returned until long after the war. Douglas did not serve the full term of the sentence, but was dragged into the investigation after the assassination of President Lincoln, taken to Washington as a witness before the military commission that tried the assassins. After his release in Washington he was arrested, and discharged several times, before taken to Fort Delaware where he after some time in confinement was set free by military orders. Douglas practiced law, at first in Winchester, but after two years, he moved his law office to Hagerstown, where he remained for the rest of his life. Douglas was a successful lawyer and an effective speaker. He ran for Congress in 1886, and was leader of the Gold Democrats in Maryland 1896. He was appointed associate justice of the Maryland Court of Appeals by Governor Jackson, but was not confirmed in the judicial elections in November the same year. Douglas kept his military interest alive; in 1876 appointed colonel on the staff of Governor Carrol. During the railway strike of 1877, Douglas commanded the Maryland forces in the Western Department of the state. His commission expiring with the outgoing governor, Douglas in 1880 became captain of a Hagerstown militia company (Hagerstown Light Infantry), and the following year lieutenant colonel of the 1st Infantry Battalion, Maryland National Guard, and colonel of the 1st Infantry Regiment, Maryland National Guard 1886 until 1891. Douglas was appointed adjutant general of Maryland 1892, and served under Governor Brown's term, until 1896. During the Spanish–American War, he was offered a commission as brigadier general of volunteers, but had to decline due to ill health. Douglas died in Hagerstown of tuberculosis in 1903.

Douglas maintained an interest in the history and memory of the civil war all his life. He was a member of the Society of the Army and Navy of the Confederate States in the state of Maryland, and had a special interest in the Washington Confederate Cemetery and the Oak Grove Cemetery. During the war, Douglas kept a diary, which he used after the war as a source for a large manuscript memoir finished about 1867. The manuscript was later used in writing his two contributions to Battles and Leaders of the Civil War: "Stonewall Jackson's Intentions at Harper's Ferry" and "Stonewall Jackson in Maryland". In 1899, Douglas reworked the manuscript. At his death, his nephew inherited the manuscript, and it was not published until 1940, as I Rode with Stonewall, by the University of North Carolina Press.

== Selected works ==
- I Rode with Stonewall: Being Chiefly the War Experiences of the Youngest Member of Jackson's Staff from the John Brown Raid to the Hanging of Mrs. Surratt (1940)
