= State of Maryland Commendation Medal =

- Country: United States of America
- Presented by: Maryland

Precedence
- Next (higher): State of Maryland Meritorious Service Medal

The State of Maryland Commendation Medal is an award in the state of Maryland to honor exceptional service to the state by members of the Maryland National Guard or military, active or former.
