= Maryland Military Department Emergency Service Medal =

Military medal

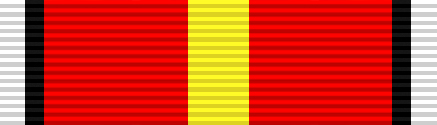

The Maryland Military Department Emergency Service Medal (formerly known as the Maryland National Guard State Active Duty Medal) is bestowed to recognize uniformed members of the Maryland Military Department who are deployed to assist in domestic crises under Title 32 of the United States Code, but not under Title 10, as recognized by the adjutant general of Maryland.
