= Annotated Code of Maryland =

Law of the state

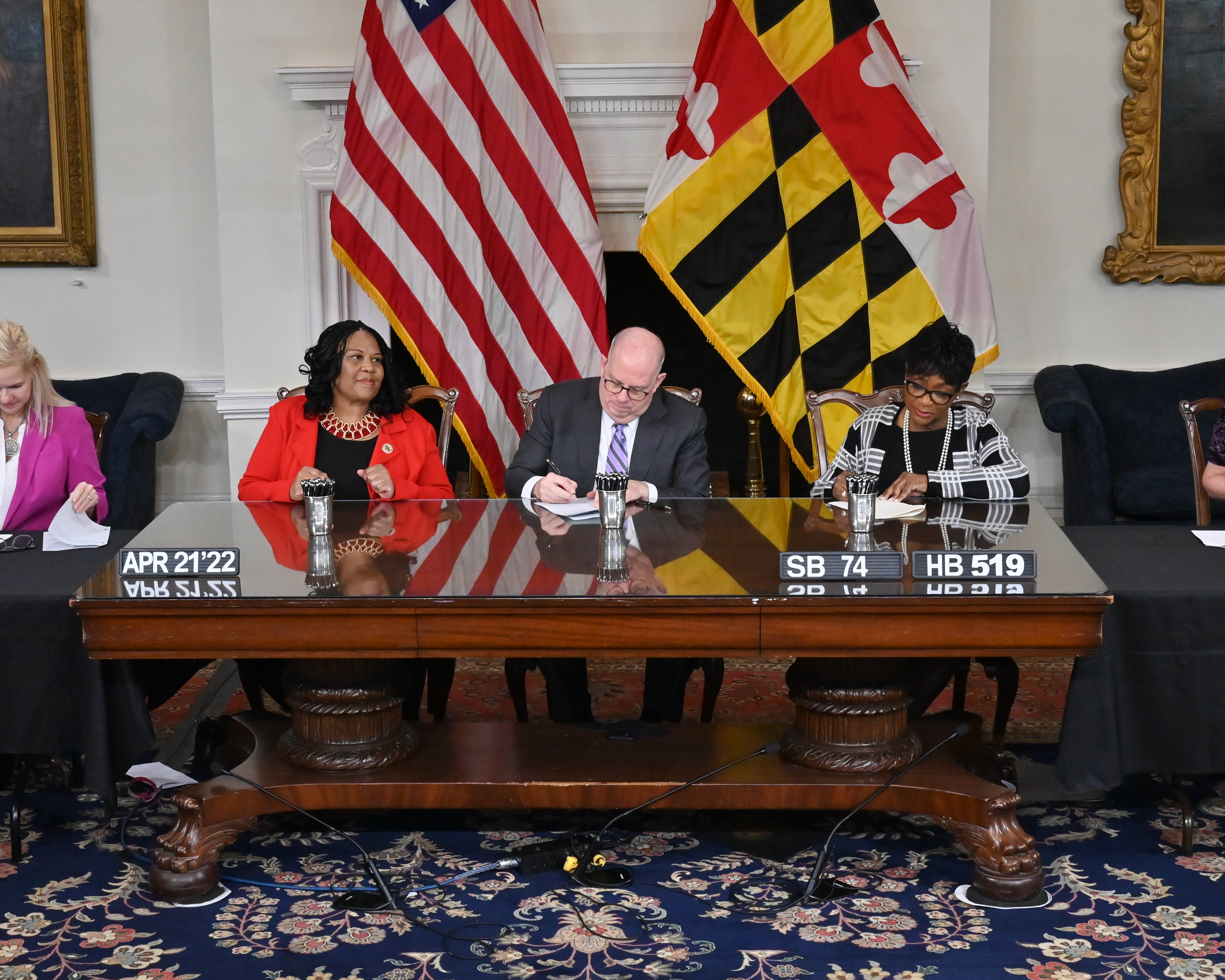
Melony G. Griffith, Larry Hogan and Adrienne A. Jones enacting Maryland law in April 2022

The Annotated Code of Maryland, published by The Michie Company, is the official codification of the statutory laws of Maryland. It is organized into 36 named articles. The previous code, organized into numbered articles, has been repealed.

== Amendment of the Code ==
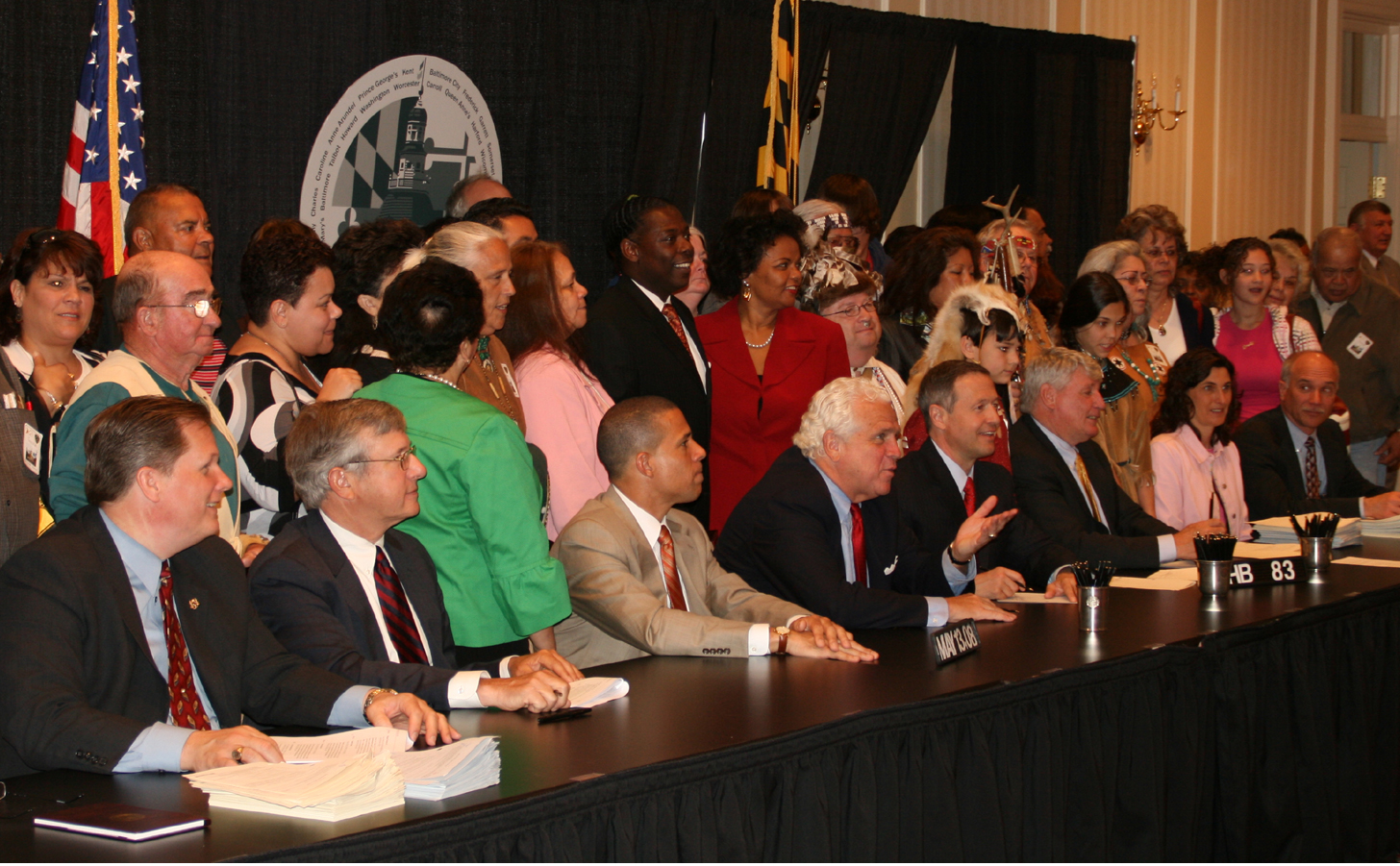
Legislators pose with Governor O'Malley at a bill signing ceremony in Annapolis, Maryland, on May 13, 2008.

The Annotated Code of Maryland is amended through the legislative process involving both houses of the Maryland General Assembly, the House of Delegates and the Senate. A bill is a proposal to change, repeal, or add to existing state law. A House Bill (HB) is one introduced in the House of Delegates (for example: HB 6); a Senate Bill (SB), in the Senate.

Bills are designated by number, in the order of introduction in each house. For example, HB 16 refers to the sixteenth bill introduced in the House of Delegates. The numbering starts afresh each legislative session. The names of the legislator who introduced the bill and of any sponsors becomes part of the bill title. Bills listed as "The Speaker (By Request of Administration)", "The President (By Request of Administration)", "Minority Leader (By Request of Administration)", or "Committee Chair (By Request of Department)" are bills proposed by the Governor and state agencies and are not proposals of the Speaker of the House, the President of the Senate, the Minority Leader, or the respective Committee Chair. They are listed with the official title of a legislator rather than the Governor due to requirements in the Maryland Constitution.

The legislative procedure, is divided into distinct stages:

- Drafting. The procedure begins when a Senator or Delegate decides to author a bill. A legislator sends the idea for the bill to the Department of Legislative Reference's bill drafting division, where it is drafted into bill form. The draft of the bill is returned to the legislator for introduction.
- Introduction or First Reading. A bill is introduced or read the first time when the bill number, the name of the sponsor, and the descriptive title of the bill are read on the floor of the house.
- Committee hearing. After introduction, a bill is assigned to the appropriate policy committee, appropriate to the subject matter, for its first hearing. Notice of the hearing is published in the Maryland Register to allow for public comment. During the committee hearing the sponsor presents the bill to the committee, and testimony may be heard in support or opposition to the bill from any member of the public. The committee then votes on whether to pass the bill out of committee, or that it be passed as amended. Bills may be amended several times. It takes a majority vote of the committee membership for a bill to be passed and sent to the next committee or to the floor.
- Second reading. A bill recommended for passage by committee is read a second time on the floor of the house. Legislators, not on the committee where the bill received its public hearing, may only offer amendments to the bill at this stage. House bills in the Senate may be amended by senators on second or third reading and Senate bills in the House may also be amended on second or third reading. After all amendments are considered, the presiding officer orders the bill to be printed for third reading. This printing would include any committee or floor amendments.
- Third reading. A roll call vote is taken. An ordinary bill needs a majority vote to pass . An emergency bill requires a two-thirds vote, a bill requiring the Maryland Constitution to be amended requires a three-fifths vote.
- Second house. If the bill receives a constitutional majority from the first house, the bill repeats the same steps in the other house. If the second house passes the bill without changing it, it is sent to the governor's desk.
- Resolution of Differences (concurrence or conference). If a measure is amended in the second house and passed, it is returned to the house of origin for consideration of amendments. The house of origin may concur with the amendments and send the bill to the governor or reject the amendments and submit it to a two-house conference committee. Appointed by the Senate President and the House Speaker, a conference committee consists of three members of each house. The committee sends a report of its recommendations to each chamber which then can adopt or reject it. If the report is adopted, the bill is voted upon for final passage in each house. If the report is rejected by either house, the bill fails.
- Governor's action. All passed bills, except the budget bill and constitutional amendments, must be presented to the Governor within twenty days following adjournment of a session. The Governor may veto such bills within thirty days after presentation. If a passed bill is not vetoed, it becomes law. The budget bill, however, becomes law upon its final passage and cannot be vetoed. Constitutional amendments also cannot be vetoed; they become law only upon their ratification by the voters at the next general election.
- Overrides. A vetoed bill is returned to the house of origin, where a vote may be taken to override the governor's veto; a three-fifths vote of both houses is required to override a veto.
- Effective date. Each bill that is passed by the Legislature and approved by the Governor is assigned a chapter number by the Secretary of State. These chaptered bills are statutes, and ordinarily become part of Maryland law. Ordinarily a law passed during a regular session takes effect October 1 of the same year. Emergency bills go into effect as soon as the governor signs them; these include acts calling for special elections and emergency measures necessary for the immediate preservation of the public peace, health, or safety.

== Recodification of articles ==
The Maryland General Assembly gradually recodified the state laws by repealing the versions organized into numbered articles in the black volumes and re-enacting new versions, which were organized into named articles and published in the red volumes. For example, Chapter 26 of the 2002 Laws of Maryland recodified most of Article 27 into the Criminal Law Article. According to the Maryland State Department of Legislative Services, the state legislature committed to the recodification process in 1970. The revised articles were enacted in stages between 1973 and 2016; the 36th and last revised article to be enacted was the Alcoholic Beverages Article in 2016. The purpose of this process was to reorganize the laws, rather than to change their content or meaning. Until the process was completed, the laws of the state of Maryland comprised both sets of volumes.

== List of articles of the Code ==
=== Named articles ===
The following is a list of the 36 named articles of the code, with the year of enactment of each. Multiple entries mean that an article was enacted in stages.

- Agriculture (1973)
- Alcoholic Beverages (2016)
- Business Occupations and Professions (1989)
- Business Regulation (1992)
- Commercial Law (1975)
- Corporations and Associations (1975)
- Correctional Services (1999, 2008)
- Courts and Judicial Proceedings (1973)
- Criminal Law (2002)
- Criminal Procedure (2001, 2008)
- Economic Development (2008)
- Education (1978)
- Election Law (2002)
- Environment (1982, 1987)
- Estates and Trusts (1974)
- Family Law (1984)
- Financial Institutions (1980)
- General Provisions (2014)
- Health - General (1982)
- Health Occupations (1981)
- Housing and Community Development (Division I) (2005)
- Housing and Community Development (Division II) (2006)
- Human Services (2007)
- Insurance (1995, 1996, 1997)
- Labor and Employment (1991)
- Land Use (2012)
- Local Government (2013)
- Natural Resources (1973)
- Public Safety (2003)
- Public Utilities (1998, 2008, 2010)
- Real Property (1974)
- State Finance and Procurement (1985, 1988)
- State Government (1984, 1985)
  - Human Relations Commission (2009)
- State Personnel and Pensions (1993, 1994)
- Tax - General (1988)
- Tax - Property (1985)
- Transportation (1977)

=== Numbered articles ===
The last numbered article was 2B Alcoholic Beverages, which was replaced with the corresponding named article in 2016.

The following is a list of some of the numbered articles, which were parts of the code before being reenacted and recodified into the named articles:

- 1 Rules of Interpretation
- 2B Alcoholic Beverages
- 19 Comptroller
- 20 Tri-County Council for Southern Maryland
- 20A Tri-County Council for Western Maryland
- 20B Tri-County Council for the Lower Eastern Shore of Maryland
- 20C Mid-Shore Regional Council
- 20D Upper Shore Regional Council
- 23 Miscellaneous Companies
- 23A Corporations - Municipal
- 23B Municipal Corporation Charter
- 24 Political Subdivisions - Miscellaneous Provisions
- 25 County Commissioners
- 25A Charted Counties of Maryland
- 25B Home Rule for Code Counties
- 26 Miscellaneous Governmental Entities
- 27 Crimes and Punishments
- 27A Public Defender
- 28 Maryland-National Capital Park and Planning Commission
- 29 Washington Suburban Sanitary District
- 31 Debt - Public
- 34 Estrays - Vessals Adrift - Drift Log
- 36 Fees of Officers
- 38A Fires and Investigations
- 41 Governor - Executive and Administrative Departments
- 43C Maryland Health and Higher Education Facilities Authority
- 45A Industrial Development
- 48 Inspections
- 49B Human Relations Commission
- 49D Children, Youth and Family Services
- 65 Militia
- 66B Land Use
- 75 Pleadings, Practice and Process at Law
- 78A Public Works
- 79 Releases and Receipts
- 82 Riots
- 83A Department of Business and Economic Development
- 88A Department of State Police
- 95 Treasurer
- 96 1/2 Veterans
