= Adjutant General of Maryland =

Head military official of military or paramilitary maintained by the state

The Adjutant General of Maryland is the administrative head of the Maryland National Guard, the Maryland Defense Force, and any other military or paramilitary units that may be maintained by the State of Maryland. The adjutant general is responsible for the military department's budget and maintains all State-owned armories in Maryland.

== History ==
Maryland Governor Thomas Sim Lee provided for the office of an adjutant general of the State Militia in "an Act to regulate and discipline the militia of this State," in compliance with the Act of Congress of 1792, entitled, "An Act more effectually to provide for the national defence, by establishing a uniform militia throughout the United States."

In October 1794, an adjutant general of Maryland was appointed for the first time and a resolution was passed at the November session of the Maryland General Assembly, as follows: "Resolved, That the treasurer of the Western Shore / be and he is hereby authorized and required to pay to The Adjutant-General of this State for the time being, the sum of two hundred pounds current money, in quarterly payments, provided the said Adjutant-General reside or keep an office at the seat of government."

In 1797, the annual salary of the office was "five hundred and thirty-three dollars and one-third of a dollar," six hundred dollars in 1799, and was later "fixed and established" by law, (chapter 168, Laws of Maryland. 1S07), at five hundred dollars annually, to be paid in quarter yearly payments. By subsequent enactments, the amount was increased at various times until the present salary was attained and established.

The Adjutant General of Maryland was given the relative military rank of "Colonel of Artillery in the line" by Chapter 251, Laws of Maryland, 1834; the relative rank of "Brigadier-General" by Chapter 284, Laws of Maryland, 1864; and finally, the present rank of "Major-General" by Chapter 337, Laws of Maryland, 1867.

== List of Maryland Adjutant Generals ==
The following sketches have been adapted and borrowed from a variety of sources, including the Maryland State Archives and the Report of the Adjutant General of Maryland 1906–1907.

=== Henry Carbery (1794–1807) ===
Henry Carbery, first adjutant general of Maryland, was born at St. Clement's Bay, St. Mary's County, Maryland, in 1757. At the commencement of the Revolutionary War in 1776, he was a "gentleman cadet" in Captain John Allen Thomas' "Independent" Company, of St. Mary's county and is mentioned in a letter from Captain Thomas to the Council of Safety, dated 8 March 1776, as "deserving notice." Carbery was appointed second lieutenant in Colonel Hartley's regiment of Continental Troops, 24 January 1777. He was promoted to first lieutenant on or about 19 September 1777, and captain on 30 November 1778. (The regiment was designated as the 11th Pennsylvania on 13 January 1779). He was wounded on 13 August 1779, and retired 17 January 1781. He was a captain in Major Henry Gaither's battalion of the "Levies of 1791," and he served under General St. Clair against the Miami Indians in November 1791. Carbery became captain of infantry, U.S. Army, on 16 March 1792, and was assigned to the 4th sub-legion 4 September 1792. He resigned 10 February 1794.

Henry Carbery was appointed adjutant general of the Maryland State Militia 6 October 1794, and served under Governors Stone, Henry, Ogle, Mercer, Robert Bowie (1803) and Wright. He was made colonel of the 36th U.S. Infantry, 22 March 1813, and resigned 4 March 1815. He died at his residence, near Georgetown, D.C. on 26 May 1822, at 66 years old.

The following tribute to Maryland's first adjutant general, both as a soldier and as a man, was written by Hon. James Brice, of Annapolis, (president of the Governor's Council and acting governor upon the death of Governor Plater in 1792), in a communication to His Excellency, George Washington and is a copy of the original document:

Maryland Annapolis February 18th, 1792. In Council. Sir: Presuming that the defence of the frontiers will require an augmented force, and that Military promotions will of course take place, we beg leave to address you in favor of Mr. Henry Carbery, who served in the late expedition against the Indians as Senior Captain in the Battalion of levies from this State, and has returned with the reputation of having exhibited an exemplary conduct as well in the unfortunate action as during the Campaign in general. These testimonies joined to the knowledge we have of his respectable deportment in private life, have impressed us with the desire of procuring him the further notice of your Excellency. We believe him to be among those men who by a prediction for the Military life are led to a closer study of the duties of that profession than officers of his rank in general impose on themselves. We beg leave Sir, to add, that during the former war he occasionally commanded a party of Cavalry against the Indians, and seems confident of acquitting himself well if he should be honored with a Command of that kind in the proposed arrangements. With the highest respect we have the honor to be your excellency's Most Obedt. Hble. Servt. (Signed) James Brice His Excellency, the President of the United States.

=== Samuel Turbutt Wright (1807–1810) ===
Samuel T. Wright, second adjutant general of Maryland, was born in Queen Anne's county, Maryland, in the year 1749. He was chosen by the Convention of Maryland, 2 January 1776, second lieutenant of Captain Edward Veazey's Seventh "Independent" Company of Maryland Militia, enrolled from Queen Anne and Kent counties; taken prisoner at the battle of Long Island, 27 August 1776; later exchanged; commissioned captain, Second Maryland Regiment, 1 January 1777, (commanding Eighth Company of the Second Battalion); resigned 1 July 1779. Was appointed lieutenant-colonel, commandant, of the Thirty-eighth Regiment, (Queen Anne's county), Maryland Militia, 18 June 1794.

At the conclusion of the Revolutionary War, Wright was admitted as an original member of The Society of the Cincinnati of Maryland when it was established in 1783.

Samuel T. Wright was appointed adjutant general of the Maryland State Militia 18 July 1807, and was authorized by Governor Robert Wright, in July 1807, to detach 5,863 men from the militia, as Maryland's quota of 100,000 men ordered by the president to be ready to take the field at a moment's notice, on account of the critical status of foreign relations at that time. He served under Governors Wright and Edward Lloyd. He was a member of the Governor's Council during the years 1781, 1782, 1785 and 1786; also, for some time held the office of Clerk of Queen Anne's county, Maryland. He died near Centreville, Maryland, 30 June 1810.

=== John Kilty (1810–1811) ===
John Kilty, third adjutant general of Maryland, was born in England in the year 1756 and was educated at St. Omer's College, in France. He was appointed by the Convention of Maryland, July 1776, an ensign in Captain Edward Tillard's company of Anne Arundel county militia, in the 3rd Maryland battalion of the Flying Camp, vice John Gassaway, resigned; commissioned a second lieutenant in the 4th Maryland Regiment, 10 December 1776; promoted to first lieutenant 6 November 1777; served in Baylor's 3rd Regiment of Light Dragoons, Continental troops, as lieutenant to 1 February 1782, and as captain from that date to 10 November 1782, when the command was consolidated with the First Continental Dragoons; retained as captain, until 31 December 1782; was "deranged," 1 January 1783. Was appointed captain of an Annapolis cavalry troop attached to the 8th Brigade, Anne Arundel County Light Dragoons, Maryland Militia, 18 June 1794; commissioned brigadier general, 8th brigade, 13 June 1810.

At the conclusion of the Revolutionary War, Kilty was admitted as an original member of The Society of the Cincinnati of Maryland.

John Kilty was appointed adjutant general of Maryland, 7 July 1810, and served under Governor Edward Lloyd. He was a member of the Governor's Council from 1786 to 1793 and president thereof in 1790, was appointed by President Washington supervisor of the revenue of the United States in Maryland in June 1795 and served as "register of the Land Office" in 1806. He died at his country seat near Annapolis, Maryland on 27 May 1811.

=== John Gassaway (1811–1817) ===
John Gassaway, fourth adjutant general of Maryland, was born in Anne Arundel county, Maryland, 18 June 1754. Was appointed by the convention of Maryland, 2 January 1776, a sergeant in Captain Nathaniel Ramsey's company, Colonel Smallwood's Maryland battalion; commissioned ensign in Captain Edward Tillard's company of Anne Arundel County militia in the 3rd Maryland battalion of the Flying Camp, July 1776; second lieutenant in Smallwood's battalion, 10 December 1776; first lieutenant, 2nd Maryland regiment, 17 April 1777; promoted to be captain-lieutenant, 1 July 1779; captain in 2nd Maryland regiment, 2 April 1780; taken prisoner at Camden, 16 August 1780 and was prisoner on parole to the close of the Revolutionary War.

After the war, Gassaway was admitted as an original member of The Society of the Cincinnati in the state of Maryland and continued to serve, holding a captaincy in the "Volunteer Company of the city of Annapolis." He was then appointed a major in the 22nd Regiment, (Anne Arundel County), Maryland militia, 18 June 1794; commissioned lieutenant-colonel, commandant, 22nd regiment, 15 September 1795; also for a time, served as brigade inspector, 8th Brigade, Anne Arundel County militia; commissioned a captain in 22nd regiment, 22 March 1808; resigned.

John Gassaway was appointed adjutant general of Maryland, 6 June 1811, and served under Governors Edward Lloyd, Robert Bowie (1811), Levin Winder and Charles Ridgely of Hampton. He was register of wills for Anne Arundel County from 1787 to 1820 and died in Annapolis, Maryland, 25 June 1820.

=== Richard Harwood, of Thomas (1817–1835) ===
Richard Harwood, of Thomas, fifth adjutant general of Maryland, was born in Anne Arundel County, Maryland, 7 March 1775. Entered the Grammar School of St. John's College, Annapolis, 11 November 1789; entered St. John's College, 1 August 1792, and graduated with the degree of Bachelor of Arts, 13 November 1794. Was commissioned lieutenant in Captain John Gwinn's company, 22nd regiment, Anne Arundel County, Maryland, militia, 23 October 1795; resigned, and was commissioned captain; promoted to be a major of the 22nd regiment, 30 July 1800; captain of a select company attached to 22nd regiment, 14 May 1802; re-commissioned major, 10 February 1804; lieutenant-colonel, commandant, 22nd Regiment, 10 March 1808.

Richard Harwood, of Thomas, was appointed adjutant general of Maryland, 30 January 1817, and served under Governors Ridgely, of Hampton, Goldsborough, Sprigg, Stevens, Kent, Daniel Martin (1828), T. K. Carroll, Daniel Martin (1830), Howard, and James Thomas. He was one of the commissioners appointed in 1820, to supervise the erection of the present county Court House in Annapolis. He died at Annapolis, Maryland, 4 April 1835.

=== John Nelson Watkins (1835–1856) ===
John N. Watkins, sixth adjutant general of Maryland, was born in Anne Arundel County, Maryland, 24 September 1790. Was a member of the class of 1811, St. John's College, Annapolis, but does not appear to have graduated. Entered the military service of the United States, War of 1812 (from 1812 to 1814), at Annapolis, in a volunteer company called the "United Guards," commanded successively, by Captains Samuel Maynard and Richard M. Chase, (in Colonel Zachariah Duvall's 22nd regiment, Anne Arundel county, Maryland militia); served as a corporal under Captain Maynard from 9 April to 29 May, and from 2 to 31 August 1813; and as a private under Captain Chase from 9 to 14 July, from 22 August to 23 September, and from 26 October to 2 November 1814, and was honorably discharged. Commissioned ensign in Captain Thomas Franklin's company, 22nd regiment, Maryland militia, 8 August 1823; promoted to brigade inspector, 8th brigade, 1st division, Maryland militia, 29 September 1825; division inspector, 1st division, 15 May 1834.

John N. Watkins was appointed adjutant general of Maryland. 19 May 1835, with the rank of a "Colonel of Artillery in the line", (Chapter 251, Laws of Md., 1834), and served under Governors J. Thomas, Veasey, Grason, F. Thomas, Pratt, P. F. Thomas, Lowe and Ligon. He was elected a delegate from Annapolis to the legislature in October 1827; was clerk of the Senate of Maryland and a member of the board of visitors and governors of St. John's College. He died in Baltimore, at an advanced age.

=== John Wilmot (1856–1858) ===
John Wilmot, seventh adjutant general of Maryland, was born at Annapolis, Maryland, in 1778. Entered the Grammar School of St. John's College, Annapolis, 17 May 1790; was a member of the class of 1798, but does not appear to have graduated; after attaining to manhood, he removed to the city of Baltimore. Was commissioned ensign in Captain James Cheston's company, 5th regiment, Maryland militia, (Baltimore), 29 July 1809; ensign in Captain David Warfield's company, attached to same regiment, 29 July 1811; mustered in with his company, known as the "Baltimore United Volunteers," in the service of the United States during the War of 1812, retaining his rank of ensign; participated in the engagement at Bladensburg, 24 August 1814; was also present at the battle of North Point, 12 September 1814, in which action he had the command of his company and received special mention for conspicuous bravery during the battle, in Brigadier-General Strieker's report, of 15 September 1814, to Major General Samuel Smith, as follows: "Ensign Wilmot, commanding the company of United Volunteers of the 5th, and many of his men distinguished themselves;" was promoted to lieutenant of the company, (then under command of Captain William Cooke Jr.,) 8 November 1814; was in the service of the United States from 19 August to 18 November 1814, when discharged. Was commissioned captain, 5th regiment, infantry, Maryland militia, 10 November 1818; resigned. Afterward engaged in mercantile life for several years in Baltimore, returning finally to Annapolis.

John Wilmot was appointed adjutant general of Maryland, with the rank of colonel of artillery, 10 March 1850, and served under Governors Ligon and Hicks. He was judge of the Orphans' Court of Anne Arundel County and held successively various public offices. He died at Annapolis, Maryland, 4 March 1858. The funeral obsequies were conducted in the House of Delegates, in the old state house, and were attended by the governor, the state officials and the members of the General Assembly, then in session. By order of the governor, the national flag was displayed at half-mast, and with solemn and impressive ceremonies the mortal remains of Colonel John Wilmot, seventh adjutant general of Maryland, were consigned to their final resting place.

=== Nicholas Brewer, of John (1858–1864) ===
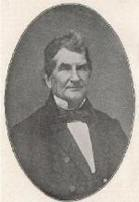
Nicholas Brewer

Nicholas Brewer, of John, eighth adjutant general of Maryland, was born at Annapolis, Maryland, 24 October 1808. Entered St. John's College, Annapolis, in 1825, and left in 1826; studied law and was admitted to the bar. He was state's attorney for Anne Arundel County for a number of years, and does not appear to have performed any military service.

Nicholas Brewer, of John, was appointed adjutant general of Maryland, with the rank of Colonel of Artillery, 24 March 1858, and resigned 4 February 1864. He served under Governors Hicks and Bradford. He was adjutant general during the Civil War (1861–1865), but beyond equipping and reviewing the troops sent to the front he had no military functions to perform. He died at Annapolis, Maryland, 14 March 1874.

=== John Summerfield Berry (1864–1869) ===
John S. Berry, ninth adjutant general of Maryland, was born in Baltimore, Maryland, 18 June 1822. Was educated partly in Baltimore and partly at Dickinson College, Carlisle, Pennsylvania; on leaving college, he entered upon a business career in Baltimore, becoming a successful merchant and, later, a manufacturer. Was elected in 1857, a delegate to the Maryland Legislature from Baltimore County, Maryland, and was chosen speaker of the house in January 1858; was again a member of the legislature in 1861 and speaker of the house during the session of 1862. Was an aide to Governor Hicks in 1857, and to Governor Bradford in 1861; a member of the Constitutional Convention of 1864.

John S. Berry was appointed adjutant general of Maryland, 10 February 1864, with the rank of brigadier general (Chapter 284, Laws of Maryland, 1864), and called out the Baltimore militia for the defense of the city, on the approach of the Confederates in July of that year; was re-appointed adjutant general, 24 March 1867, with the rank of major general, (Chapter 337, Laws of Maryland, 1867); he served under Governors Bradford, Swann and Oden Bowie, devoting much time to carrying out in all its particulars the law creating the "Maryland National Guard." Was appointed, in 1885, a member of the Park Board of Baltimore, served for several years and discharged faithfully and diligently the duties of the position. He died in Baltimore, 3 January 1901.

=== George Henry Bier (1869–1871) ===
George H. Bier, tenth adjutant general of Maryland, was born in Baltimore, Maryland, 11 July 1824. Entered the Naval Academy as midshipman, 19 October 1841; warranted a passed midshipman from 10 August 1847; warranted as a master from 14 September 1855; promoted to lieutenant, 15 September 1855; ordered to the U.S.S. "Atalanta," for the Paraguay Expedition, in October 1858; resigned from the U.S. Navy, to take effect from 23 April 1861. Appointed first lieutenant, C.S. Navy,13 November 1861; appointed major, C.S. Army, (with temporary rank), 14 July 1862, and ordered to report to General T. J. Jackson, serving as chief of ordnance; relieved from further duty as major and chief of ordnance with General T. J. Jackson, 12 January 1863, and ordered to report to the Secretary of the C.S. Navy, at Richmond; participated in the attack of Confederate ironclads upon the Federal blockading fleet, on board the C.S.S. "Chicora", (Commander John R. Tucker, C.S.N., commanding), off Charleston, S. C, 31 January, 186.3; resigned from C.S. Navy, 25 June 1863; in February 1864, was in command of the blockade-runner "Dee", and on 10 May 1864, was captured, while in command of the "Anglo-rebel blockade-runner Greyhound"; at the close of the war, returned to Baltimore. George H. Bier was appointed adjutant general of Maryland, with rank of major general, 6 April 1869, and served under Governor Oden Bowie; resigned 3 February 1871. He died at Key West, Fla., 13 April 1905.

=== Frank A. Bond (1874–1880) ===
Frank A. Bond, twelfth adjutant general of Maryland, was born at Bel Air, Harford County, Maryland, in 1838, and moved to Jessups, Anne Arundel County, Maryland, in 1857. In 1859, he raised a company of infantry, called the "United Rifles," and was commissioned captain by Governor Hicks; the company was disbanded and partially disarmed by U.S. troops in 1861, but the majority of the arms went south with Captain Bond, who was given the rank of captain by Governor Letcher of Virginia and was assigned, by written order of Colonel "Stonewall" Jackson, as drill-master, 8th Virginia infantry; enlisted as corporal, company M, 1st Virginia Cavalry, C.S. Army, 14 May 1861; elected second lieutenant, company M, 1 August 1861, and was afterwards dropped at the re-organization of the company, 5 May 1862. In May 1862, was instrumental in raising a company of cavalry that became Company A, 1st Maryland Cavalry, C.S.A., and was elected first lieutenant; upon organization of the battalion, promoted to captain, Company A, 12 November 1862; at Greenland Gap, W.V., 25 April 1863, all the senior officers were disabled, and Captain Bond commanded the battalion during the remainder of the campaign; Company A was detailed for special duty in the Gettysburg campaign, and Captain Bond was provost marshal during the three days they occupied the town; on 6 July 1863, Captain Bond's command was engaged in a brilliant action with a force under Colonel Ulric Dalghren at Hagerstown, Maryland, in which Bond was severely wounded and left a prisoner; was confined at Fort McHenry and at Point Lookout, but was exchanged in May 1864; placed on the retired list of the regular C.S. Army, but in October, of the same year, accepted the position of adjutant general, with the rank of major, on the staff of General Leaventhorpe, commanding North Carolina troops; served until the close of the war and was paroled at Greensboro, N.C., 1 May 1865. Returning to his home, at Jessups, Maryland, he raised a company of cavalry and was commissioned captain. This company became company G, 3rd Maryland Cavalry, and upon the organization of the 3rd Battalion of Cavalry, he was elected colonel and commissioned by Governor Oden Bowie, 22 November 1867; made brevet brigadier general 17 May 1869; brigadier general 2nd Brigade, 3rd Division, 25 May 1869; major general 14 May 1870, commanding 3rd Division, Maryland National Guard, until the expiration of their service.

Frank A. Bond was appointed adjutant general of Maryland, with the rank of major general, 4 April 1874; reappointed, 22 March 1876; served under Governors Groome, Carroll, and Hamilton, (pro tem).

=== John Wesley Watkins (1880–1884) ===
J. Wesley Watkins, thirteenth adjutant general of Maryland, was born in Baltimore, Maryland, in October 1807. Lived for seven years of his boyhood at West River, Anne Arundel County, and then removed to his native city; became a contractor and builder, and erected several of Baltimore's public edifices. Was active in the state militia, serving from the ranks up; was commissioned second lieutenant in Captain Charles Howard's "Mechanical Volunteers", 5th regiment infantry, Maryland militia, 20 January 1836; promoted to first lieutenant, 25 May 1836; captain of the "Mechanical Volunteers" company, 21 May 1839; commissioned lieutenant colonel, 39th regiment infantry of Baltimore 3d June 1846. During the Mexican War (1846–1847), he was enrolled 10 June 1847, and mustered into the service of the United States, 24 July 1847, as captain of a company bearing his name, but no record of his service is found. Was commissioned major, in the 5th regiment, infantry, attached to 1st Light Brigade, Maryland Volunteers of Baltimore 7 September 1847; appointed colonel 5th regiment, Maryland Volunteer Infantry, 5 February 1856; appointed brigadier general, 1st Light Brigade (composed of the 1st Light Cavalry regiment, a regiment of artillery and the Fifth Regiment), 14 February 1861, but not confirmed; no record of service in the Civil War (1861–1865). Was a member of the Baltimore City Council as far back as 1837 and served several terms; was United States marshal under President Pierce's administration; chief engineer of the Baltimore Fire Department from 15 March 1868, to 15 June 1871, and held other public offices.

J. Wesley Watkins was appointed adjutant general of Maryland, with the rank of major general, 6 April 1880, and served under Governors Hamilton and McLane, (pro tem). He died near Watersville, Carroll County, Maryland, 17 September 1887.

=== James Howard (1884–1892) ===
James Howard, fourteenth adjutant general of Maryland, was born in Baltimore, Maryland, 23 October 1832. Educated at the private school of Mr. McNally in that city; entered service of U.S. Army. Commissioned second lieutenant, company B, 3rd U.S. Artillery, 27 February 1857; served at Fort Columbus, New York Harbor, until December 1857, and was then ordered to join his company at Benicia, Ca.; thence ordered to Fort Umpqua, Oregon Territory; in spring of 1858 was transferred with his company to Fort Vancouver, Washington Territory and on breaking out of hostilities with the Northern Indians was detailed with his company, along with several other commands, for duty with Colonel George Wright in his campaign against these tribes. Returning in the Fall, was one of the escort of 100 men of 3rd artillery, to the expedition of Captain John Mullan, charged with the duty of constructing a military wagon road from Walla Walla to Fort Benton on the Upper Missouri river; returning from this expedition in the fall of 1860; was granted leave of absence for six months; resigned his commission 3 April 1861. Entered the service of the C.S. Army at Montgomery, Ala. and was appointed first lieutenant of artillery, C.S. Army, 13 April 1861, to rank from 16 March 1861; ordered to report to General Braxton Bragg, at Pensacola, Fla., as Instructor of Artillery; appointed to temporary rank of lieutenant-colonel, to rank from 30 August 1862; served as aide-de-camp to Major General G. W. Smith, and also as lieutenant-colonel commanding heavy artillery in Richmond defenses; relieved from duty at Richmond, temporarily, and continued in command of the 18th and 20th battalions, Virginia Artillery, in the field. On the retreat from Richmond, with the division of General G. W. Custis Lee, was engaged and captured in the battle of Sailor's Creek, two days before the surrender at Appomattox, and sent to Johnson's Island, whence he was liberated, after imprisonment of about six weeks, and returned to Baltimore. Was commissioned colonel and aide-de-camp on the staff of Governor Oden Bowie, 8 February 1871; acting assistant adjutant general on the staff of Governor Whyte, 5 February 1872; was brigadier general and chief of artillery on the staff of Governor Whyte, in 1873; made brigadier general and chief of artillery on the staff of Governor Groome, 6 April 1874; resigned 4 June 1874. Commissioned colonel of the 7th regiment, M.N.G., 24 July 1877, during the railroad riots of that year, and served until the regiment was disbanded, 23 August 1877.

James Howard was appointed adjutant general of Maryland, with the rank of major general, 8 April 1884; reappointed, 25 February 1886; again re-appointed, 21 February 1888; served under Governors McLane, Henry Lloyd and Jackson.

=== Henry Kyd Douglas (1892–1896) ===
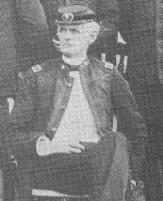
Henry Kyd Douglas

Henry Kyd Douglas, fifteenth adjutant general of Maryland, was born at Sheperdstown, Va., (now West Virginia), 29 September 1838. Graduated from Franklin-Marshall College in 1859; studied law, graduating in 1860. Enlisted at Harper's Ferry as private, company B, 2nd Virginia infantry, ("Stonewall" Brigade), C.S. Army, 18 April 1861; promoted to be first sergeant, 5 June 1861; second lieutenant, 14 September 1861; appointed captain in 1862; major and assistant adjutant general to rank from 13 June 1863; was adjutant and inspector general of the "Stonewall" Brigade, from which he was transferred to a post as aide-de-camp on General "Stonewall" Jackson's staff; after Jackson's death served in succession on the staffs of Generals Edward Johnson. John B. Gordon, Jubal A. Early and others, commanding the "Stonewall" division and Jackson's corps; made colonel of the 13th and 14th Virginia regiments consolidated and assigned to command of the light brigade formerly commanded by Generals Early and A. P. Hill; was promoted to rank of brigadier general, but his commission did not reach him. Was wounded severely at Gettysburg and for a short while confined in the old Capitol prison; was at Appomattox and was paroled 9 April 1865. After the war he practiced law in Winchester, Virginia, and in 1868 came to Hagerstown, Maryland. Was appointed colonel and aide-de-camp on the staff of Governor Carroll, February 1876; in 1877, during the railroad strikes of that year, in command of the Department of Western Maryland. Captain, Hagerstown Light Infantry, 22 November 1880; commissioned lieutenant-colonel, 1st Battalion, Maryland Infantry, 29 September 1881; colonel, 1st Regiment, Maryland Infantry, (1st brigade), 29 May 1886; resigned, 16 April 1891.

Henry Kyd Douglas was appointed adjutant general of Maryland, with the rank of major general, 3 March 1892, and served under Governor Brown. He died at Hagerstown, Maryland, 18 December 1903.

=== Lemuel Allison Wilmer (1896–1900) ===
L. Allison Wilmer, sixteenth adjutant general of Maryland, was born in Charles County, Maryland, 17 September 1849. Educated in the public schools of Charles County and at Charlotte Hall Academy, St. Mary's County; for a time taught a public school in his native county. Entered the "Freshmen" class, St. John's College, Annapolis, 16 September 1867, graduating 26 July 1871, "first honor" man in his class; entered the Law School of the University of Maryland, Baltimore, in October 1872, graduating 2 June 1874, and opened a law office in Baltimore that year, with the late John S. Wirt, Esq.; after practicing for seven years in that city, he returned to Charles county where he continued to practice his profession. Enlisted in company "A," 5th regiment, M.N.G., as a private in 1877; commissioned second lieutenant, same company, 14 January 1879; captain, company "I," 5th regiment, 2 April 1880; resigned, 10 January 1882; elected captain of the "Howard Rifles," of Charles county and commissioned 7 September 1886; (the company was afterwards attached to the 1st regiment, M.N.G., and was known as company "E"); commissioned lieutenant-colonel, 1st regiment, infantry, 19 December 1888; promoted to colonel, 11 May 1891.

L. Allison Wilmer was appointed adjutant general of Maryland, with the rank of major general, 19 February 1896, and served under Governor Lowndes. He was elected state's attorney for Charles county in 1883, and re-elected in 1887; was again elected state's attorney in 1899 and re-elected in 1903 for four years and was president of the State Bar Association. General Wilmer lived in La Plata, Maryland

=== John Selden Saunders (1900–1904) ===
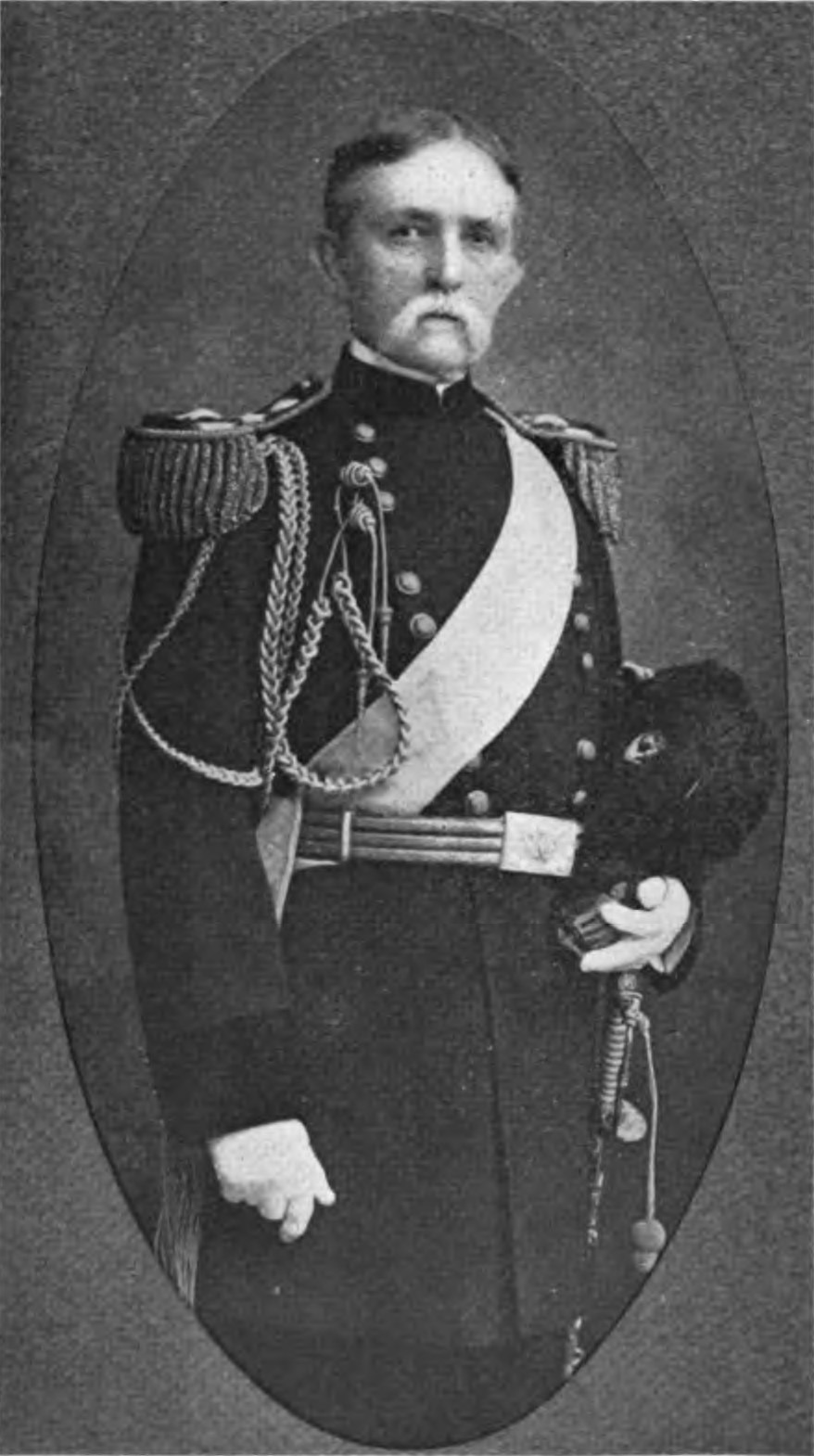
John S. Saunders

John S. Saunders, seventeenth adjutant general of Maryland, was born at Norfolk, Va., 30 January 1836. Was educated, partly, in Norfolk and, partly at St. James' College, Hagerstown, Maryland. When eighteen years old was appointed, by President Pierce, a cadet-at-large to West Point; was cadet at the U.S. Military Academy from 1 July 1854 to 1 July 1858, graduating with honors, the fifth in his class; was appointed brevet second lieutenant, 2nd artillery, U.S. Army, and assigned to duty as adjutant of the battalion at West Point; transferred to Ordnance Department of the Army, 1 September 1858; (upon the occasion of the Prince of Wales' visit to this country in 1860, was aide to the Prince during his tour of the United States); appointed second lieutenant. 1 February 1861; resigned from the U.S. Army, 22 April 1861.

Was appointed first lieutenant, C.S. Artillery, 18 May 1861, to rank from 16 March 1861; promoted to captain of artillery, Provisional Army of Virginia, 8 May 1862; appointed to temporary rank of lieutenant-colonel, 14 November 1862, to report to General G. W. Smith; afterwards, served as lieutenant-colonel of artillery and chief-of ordnance; commanded six batteries of artillery in the successful attack upon Norfolk.

After General McClellan's retreat, was ordered to report to General Pemberton at Vicksburg, and was in charge of the fortifications in the siege of Vicksburg; was there captured, but promptly exchanged; assigned to duty as chief of artillery in the inspector general's office, Department of the South—later, transferred to the Army of Northern Virginia; was detailed on special duty by President Davis; upon the evacuation of Richmond, rejoined the Army of Northern Virginia, surrendering at Appomattox; paroled, 9 April 1865.

He returned to Norfolk, but removed to Baltimore in 1867; entered the service of the Maryland National Guard as colonel and brigade inspector, 7 May 1887, and resigned, 7 February 1900.

John S. Saunders was appointed adjutant general of Maryland, with the rank of major general, 7 February 1900, and served under Governor Smith.

He died at Annapolis, Maryland, 19 January 1904. The body of Adjutant General Saunders was brought to Baltimore, and the public solemnities were conducted in the Fifth Regiment Armory, whence the funeral escort, consisting of one battalion from each of the several infantry regiments together with the cavalry troop of the Maryland National Guard, conveyed the body of the deceased to Green Mount Cemetery, where it was interred with military honors.

=== Clinton Levering Riggs (1904–1908) ===
Clinton L. Riggs, eighteenth adjutant general of Maryland, was born in New York City, 13 September 1866; during the same year, his parents removed to Baltimore, Maryland.

At the age of eleven, he entered St. Paul's School, Concord, N. H.; later, entered Princeton University, and graduated, as civil engineer in 1887, standing second in his class.

After practicing his profession a short time in Iowa, returned to Baltimore and entered the machine shop of Robert Poole & Son Company; engaged with the Detrick and Harvey Machine Company, of Baltimore, 9 February 1891, and retired from business, as vice-president of that company, 15 January 1903.

Entered the service of the Maryland National Guard, as second lieutenant, Company E, 5th Regiment Infantry, 29 April 1890; elected captain, Company F, 5th regiment, 23 February 1891; commissioned major, 5th regiment, 12 November 1895; was mustered into the service of the United States, during the Spanish–American War, as major, 5th Maryland, U.S. Volunteer Infantry, 14 May 1898; mustered out with his regiment at the close of the war, 22nd, October 1898; resigned from the Maryland National Guard, 26 January 1899.

Clinton L. Riggs, was appointed adjutant general of Maryland, with the rank of major general, 29 January 1904, and served under Governor Warfield.

=== Henry M. Warfield (1908–1912, 1916–1920) ===
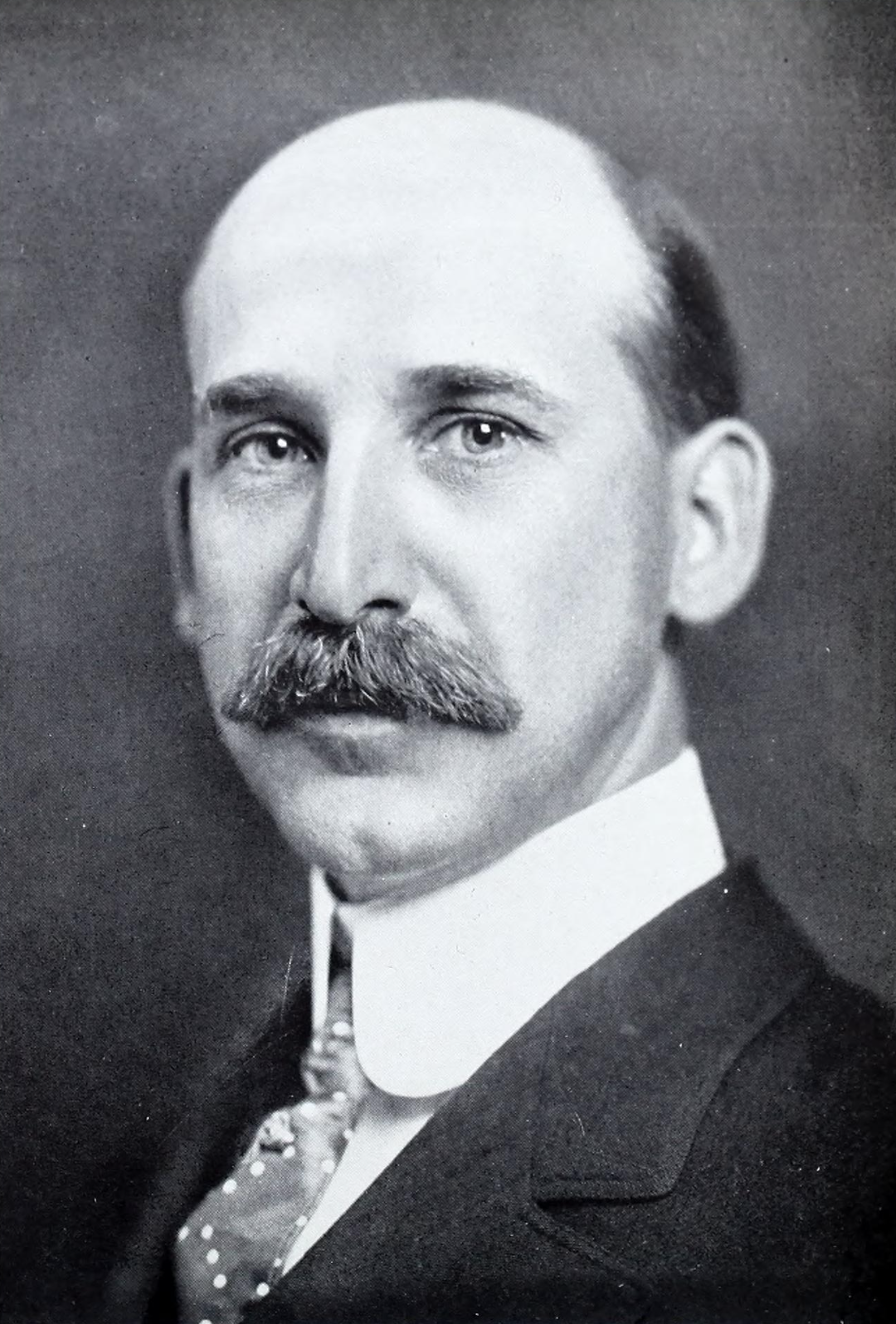
Henry Mactier Warfield

Henry M. Warfield was born in Baltimore on 1 July 1867. He was a son of the late Henry M. Warfield, who was a member of the State Legislature of 1861 and the candidate for mayor of Baltimore on the reform ticket in 1875. General Warfield's connection with the National Guard of Maryland dates from 1 November 1885, when he enlisted as a private in Company K, 5th Infantry, serving as such until 1 November 1888, the date of his election as second lieutenant of that company. He was elected first lieutenant Company F, 5th Infantry, 16 April 1891, serving in this position until commissioned captain and inspector of rifle practice on the Regimental Staff, 14 March 1892. He was elected captain Company B, 5th Infantry, 12 December 1892, and major, 5th Infantry, 28 October 1895. He served as a major in this regiment until 30 June 1903, on which date he was elected and commissioned colonel of the regiment, holding this position until appointed adjutant general by His Excellency Governor Crothers, 22 January 1908.

General Warfield was again appointed adjutant general by Governor Harrington 3 March 1916. During the Spanish–American War, he was mustered into the service of the United States as major in the 5th Maryland, U. S. Volunteer Infantry, 13 May 1898, serving until this regiment was mustered out, 22 October 1898. General Warfield always took much interest in the affairs of his native city, both business and social. He was the resident manager of the Royal Insurance Company, Ltd., of Liverpool, with offices in the Chamber of Commerce Building, Baltimore, and one of the directors of the Board of Trade, and Farmers' and Merchants' Bank, Baltimore. His membership in the clubs of Baltimore includes the Maryland, Elkridge, Merchants' and Bachelors' Cotillon.

=== Charles F. Macklin (1912–1916) ===
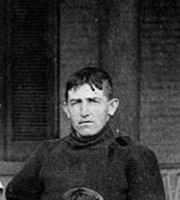
Charles F. Macklin

Charles F. Macklin was born in Ft. Sully, S.D. on 21 April 1871, and later moved to Ilchester, Maryland. Macklin was educated in public schools and DeVeaugh College, Suspension Bridge, New York. He was a midshipman at the U.S. Naval Academy in Annapolis from 1888 to 1892 and served at sea from 1892 through 1894. Macklin was commissioned as a second lieutenant U.S. Marine Corps 1 July 1894, and resigned 1 July 1896. He joined the Maryland National Guard (1st Brigade) 11 February 1901 and served as inspector general. Macklin became commander of the 4th Maryland Infantry 19 August 1904. He was promoted to brigadier general and commander of the Maryland National Guard's 1st Brigade on 17 November 1909. Macklin was a key member of the 4th Maryland Infantry and was a driving force behind the emphasis on rifle marksmanship in the MDNG in the early 20th century. He himself was one of the captains of a Maryland rifle team that won several competitions.

Macklin was assigned as adjutant general of Maryland on 2 February 1912 and retired 4 March 1916. He then assumed command of the Maryland Naval Militia (then part of the Maryland National Guard) on 12 April 1916. He died in Baltimore on 16 April 1945.

=== Milton A. Reckord (1920–1941, 1945–1965) ===
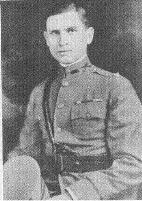
Milton Reckord

Milton Atchison Reckord (28 December 1879 – 8 September 1975) was an important figure in the history of the National Guard of the United States. Reckord expressed desire to serve in the military, but at the request of his mother, delayed entry into service until he turned 21. He enlisted in Company D, 1st Maryland Infantry, Maryland National Guard on 15 February 1901, and would eventually rise to command the same company when he was commissioned as a captain in December 1904. As a major, in 1916, Reckord was given command of the 2nd Battalion, 1st Maryland Infantry, which deployed to the Mexican border and served in the Mexican Expedition commanded by Gen. John J. Pershing. When the 29th Infantry Division was created on the eve of World War I in 1917, Reckord was given command of one of its regiments, the 115th Infantry, which saw combat during the Meuse-Argonne Offensive.

In 1920, he was appointed adjutant general of the Maryland National Guard and, in 1934, while still serving as Maryland's adjutant general, he assumed command of the 29th Infantry Division. During the years between the First and Second World War, Reckord was a leading advocate for increasing the role of the National Guard in the United States' national defensive strategy. From 1923 to 1925, he served as president of the National Guard Association of the United States. In 1933, he authored legislation that permanently gave National Guard personnel status as both state and federal troops.

Reckord was mobilized for World War II with the 29th Infantry Division in February 1941 and took a leave of absence from his post as Maryland's adjutant general. Deemed by the Army to be too old to command a division in combat, he was relieved of command and assigned as the commander of the III Corps Area. He later deployed overseas and was named theater provost marshal, European Theater of Operations.

After World War II, Reckord returned to his post as the adjutant general of Maryland. He was promoted to the state rank of lieutenant general by Governor J. Millard Tawes in 1961, and continued to serve as adjutant general until his retirement in 1966. Reckord was born to John and Lydia (Zimmerman) Reckord at their home in Harford County, Maryland. He commenced work at his father's milling plant in 1896 upon his graduation from Bel Air High School. He was married to Bessie Payne Roe from 1910 until her death in 1943, and had one daughter with her, Gladys Atchison Reckord.

=== Francis Petrott (1941–1945, acting) ===
Francis Petrott was born in New York City, 6 April 1896. He attended private and public schools of New York and Connecticut; Georgetown University, 1914–17, graduated 1921; Princeton University, School of Military Aeronautics, graduated 1921; Yale University Graduate School, 1921–25. Married Mary Catherine James of Frederick, Maryland, 11 September 1921; one daughter, Doris Ann.

Served in the U.S. Army, 1917–21; U.S. Officer Reserve Corp after 1921; promoted to brigadier general during World War II. Engaged in the private practice of law, Frederick, Maryland. Acting adjutant general and acting chief of staff, staff of Governor Harry W. Nice, 1935. Appointed Maryland secretary of state, 1939–41 by Governor Herbert R. O'Conor. Adjutant general, 1941–45. Member, Frederick County Bar Association. Attorney for the Maryland Industrial Finance Company; Frederick County Beer Dealers' Association. Commander of the Francis Scott Key Post American Legion. Commander of Washington and Lee Chapter, Disabled American Veterans of the World War. President, Frederick Kiwanis Club. Exalted Ruler of Frederick Lodge No. 684, B. P. O. Elks. First vice president of the State Elks Association. President, Catoctin Country Club. Member, executive committee, Frederick Cotillion Club.

=== George M. Gelston (1965–1970) ===
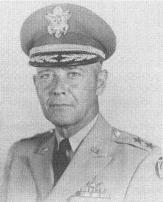
George Gelston

George M. Gelston's tenure as adjutant general of Maryland was an active one as the Maryland National Guard was called into state duty several times (and federalized once) in response to severe domestic disturbances in Maryland. Gelston was instrumental in defusing the Cambridge riot of 1963 and the Baltimore riot of 1968. In World War II, Gelston served as a liaison pilot with an artillery unit in the European theater of operations. He joined the Maryland National Guard in 1947 as the 29th Division's chief artillery air officer. Later, he participated in the Maryland National Guard's air defense program in the Baltimore-Washington area, serving as commanding officer of the 684th Anti-aircraft Artillery Battalion (90mm gun).

He held the position of assistant adjutant general in 1966. The Maryland National Guard armory in White Oak was named in his honor.

=== Edwin Warfield III (1970–1979) ===
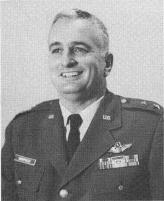
Edwin Warfield III

Born in Baltimore, 3 June 1924, son of Edwin Warfield Jr. resided at the "Oakdale," Warfield family estate in Howard County. Attended Gilman School; graduated in 1942 from Kent School, Connecticut; served in the Pacific Theater as a P-51 Mustang pilot during World War II; attended Cornell University; The Johns Hopkins University; University of Maryland, B.S., Agriculture, 1950. Married Carol Horton in 1947; five children; Edwin Warfield IV, John W. Warfield, Elizabeth W., Diana W., Karen. Married Ellen "Niki" Owens in 1967. Died of congestive heart failure at St. Agnes Health-Care, 4 October 1999. General Assembly House of Delegates, Howard County, 1963–70. Chair, Agriculture and Natural Resources Committee, 1963–70. Private Career and Other Public Service; Enlisted in the Army Air Corps, 1943; served in the Pacific during World War II. Retired Commander, Maryland National Guard.

Adjutant general of Maryland, 1970–80. Chairman of the board and chief executive of The Daily Record, founded by his grandfather Edwin Warfield, Governor of Maryland from 1904 to 1908. Chair, Governor's Commission on the Expansion of the University of Maryland. Member, Warfield Commission on higher education in Maryland; World War II Memorial Commission; Maryland Club, South River Club, Sons of the American Revolution, Howard County Hunt Club, Bachelors Cotillion. Communicant, St. Andrew Episcopal Church in Glenwood, Howard County, and St. John Episcopal Church, Ellicott City.

=== Warren D. Hodges (1980–1987) ===
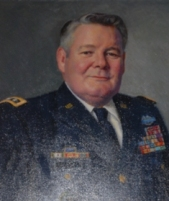
Warren Hodges

Warren D. Hodges was born in Lawrence, Kan. and attended the University of Kansas, where he played baseball and football before joining the Army in 1942. He later earned a degree from the University of Nebraska. He was also a graduate of several military command schools.

Hodges served during World War II in France and Germany, where he was wounded, and was later assigned to Japan, where he was General Douglas MacArthur's honor guard commander.

In July 1950, he returned to active duty in Korea as a battalion commander and regimental operations officer. He then served in the United States, Greece and Pakistan. He was deputy chief of the National Guard at the Pentagon before going to Vietnam, where he served as a brigade commander and division chief of staff. In 1969, he became chief of staff at Aberdeen Proving Ground and then commander of the combined Edgewood Arsenal and APG. He retired in 1972. He became an assistant secretary for capital planning in the state Department of Planning, and was named to head the Maryland National Guard by Governor Harry R. Hughes in 1980. He held the post until 1987.

Among his awards were the Combat Infantryman Badge with two stars, Distinguished Service Medal, Silver Star, Legion of Merit, Bronze Star and Purple Heart. He belonged to many veterans and military societies.

=== James F. Fretterd (1987–2002) ===
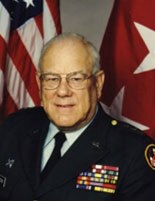
James Fretterd

James F. Fretterd served as the adjutant general of Maryland from February 1987 to 15 January 2003.

Born in Staten Island, New York, 2 November 1930. U.S. Army Command and General Staff College, 1973; U.S. Army War College, 1977. University of the State of New York, B.S. (sociology), 1984; Senior Executives Programs in National and International Security, Harvard University, 1987. Two daughters.

Member, Governor's Commission on Maryland Military Monuments, 1989–2003; Task Force on Youth Citizenship and Violence Prevention, 1995–96; World War II Memorial Commission, 1997–98; executive committee, Maryland Terrorism Forum, 1998–2003; Governor's Year-2000 Readiness Task Force, 1999–2000; governor's executive council, 1999–2003; Cabinet Council on Criminal and Juvenile Justice, 1999–2003; Maryland Security Council, 2002–03. Chair, General Officer Steering Committee on National Guard Participation in International Affairs, National Guard Bureau (includes oversight of State Partnership for Peace Program). chief of staff, Maryland Army National Guard, 1976–81. assistant adjutant general for Army, 1981–87.

=== Bruce F. Tuxill (2002–2008) ===
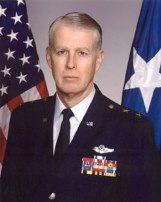
Bruce Tuxill

Major General Bruce F. Tuxill served as the adjutant general of Maryland from 15 January 2003, to 1 June 2008.

Born in Geneva, New York, 10 November 1945. Salem College, B.S. (business administration), 1967. Graduate, Capstone Program, National Defense University, 1996; National Security College; Combined Force Air Component Commander Course, U.S. Air Force. Chair, Air Reserve Forces Policy Committee. Former chair, Air National Guard Council, Air Force Association. Former chair, Resolutions Committee (former chair, resolutions air subcommittee), National Guard Association of the United States. Defense Distinguished Service Medal, 2002.

Assistant adjutant general for Air, 1994–2000. Officer and pilot, Maryland National Guard, 1968–2000 (pilot training, 1968–69; squadron pilot, 104th Tactical Fighter Squadron, 1969–76; chief, standardization & evaluation, 175th Fighter Group, 1976–78; operations officer, 175th Fighter Group, 1978–80; squadron commander, 104th Fighter Squadron, 1980–82; deputy commander for operations, 175th Fighter Group, 1982–83; commander, 175th Fighter Group, 1983–94). Air National Guard assistant to commander, U.S. Air Forces Europe (USAFE), April 2000 to January 2003. Co-chair, executive committee, Maryland Terrorism Forum, 2003. Member, Maryland Security Council, 2003–05; Governor's Executive Council, 2003–08; Homeland Security Senior Policy Group, 2004; Task Force to Study State Assistance to Veterans, 2006–08. Member, executive committee, Anti-Terrorism Advisory Council of Maryland, U.S. Attorney's Office, 2003–08.

=== James A. Adkins (2008–2015) ===
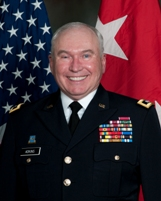
James Adkins

Major General James A. Adkins served as the adjutant general of Maryland from 1 June 2008, to 21 January 2015.

General Adkins was born in Cambridge and grew up in Dorchester County on Maryland's Eastern Shore. Prior to entering the U.S. Army, he served two years with the Dorchester County Sheriff's Office.

His military career spans more than 30 years of service in both the enlisted and officer ranks. He has served at nearly every level of command and in various staff assignments. He is a graduate of the Defense Language Institute's Russian Language Program in Monterey, Ca. and served in intelligence, infantry and cavalry assignments in the United States and abroad. His military assignments also included director of military support to civil authorities, counter-drug taskforce commander and coordinator of emergency management operations. After the collapse of the Soviet Union, he assisted the Republic of Estonia in its transition to democracy.

General Adkins' military decorations include the Legion of Merit, the Maryland Distinguished Service Cross and the Order of the White Cross from the Republic of Estonia.

General Adkins served in the Maryland Military Department as chief of staff and assistant adjutant general for state operations. He also served as director of the Cemetery and Memorial Programs and as the deputy secretary of Veterans Affairs. In May 2007, Governor Martin O'Malley appointed General Adkins to his cabinet as the secretary of Veterans Affairs. He served as the state's key advisor for veteran issues until September 2009. For more than a year and a half, General Adkins simultaneously held two cabinet-level positions in the O'Malley administration while serving as the adjutant general.

=== Linda L. Singh (2015–2019) ===
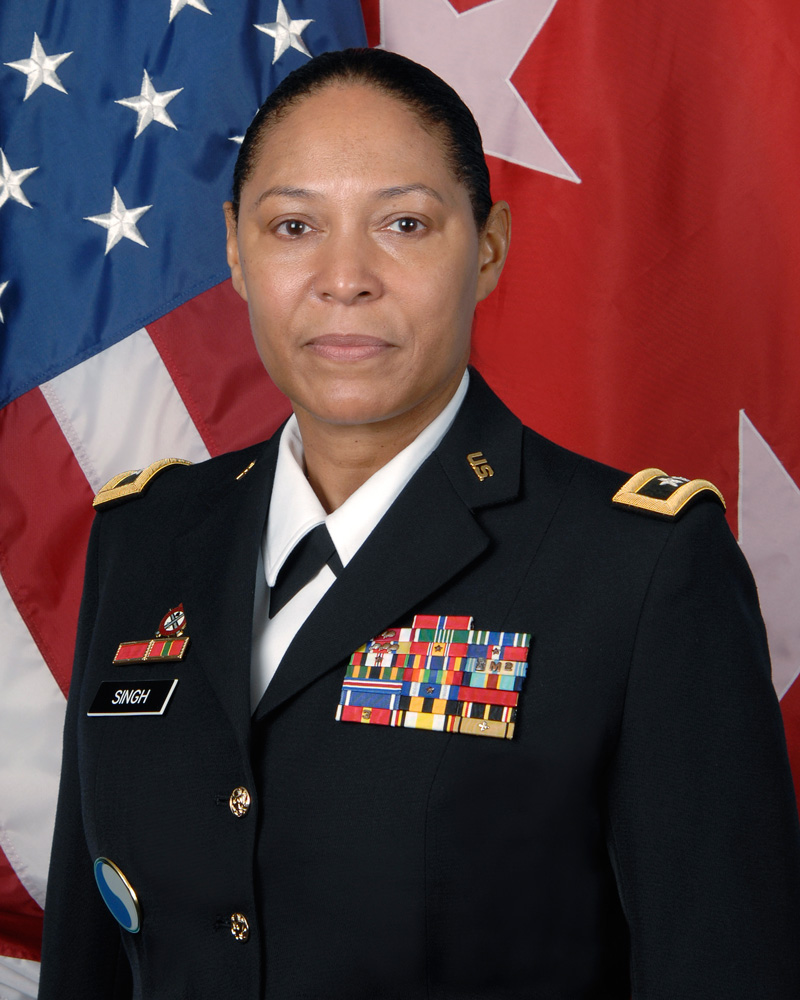
Linda L. Singh

Major General (MD) Linda L. Singh served as the acting adjutant general from 21 January to 27 March 2015, when she was then appointed as the 29th adjutant general of Maryland, serving until her retirement on 31 August 2019.

Singh was born in Frederick, Maryland, and is a longtime Maryland resident. She received her commission in 1991 through the Maryland Military Academy's Officer Candidate School in Reisterstown, Maryland.

Her military career spans more than 30 years of service in both the enlisted and officer ranks. She has served at nearly every level of command and in various staff assignments two of which were oversea deployments to Kosovo and a combat tour to Afghanistan supporting Operation Enduring Freedom. Her previous military assignments include commander of the Maryland Army National Guard and director of the Joint Staff.

=== Timothy E. Gowen (2019–2023) ===
Major General Timothy E. Gowen was the 30th adjutant general of Maryland, appointed 1 September 2019.

=== Janeen L. Birckhead (2023–present) ===
Brigadier General Janeen L. Birckhead is the 31st adjutant general of Maryland, appointed 5 April 2023. As of 2023, she is currently the only serving Black woman leading a state military in the United States.
