= Maryland Outstanding Unit Ribbon =

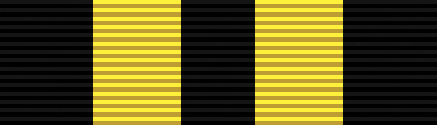

The Maryland Outstanding Unit Ribbon is an award bestowed in the state of Maryland to recognize members of the annually selected outstanding unit of the fiscal year in the Maryland Air National Guard and the Maryland Army National Guard. Any service member who was assigned to the unit for at least a day during the year is entitled to receive the ribbon. Since 2010, the ribbon is modified to reflect multiple receipt of this award with Arabic numerals. Previously, it was marked with clusters of oak leaves.
