= Laws of Maryland =

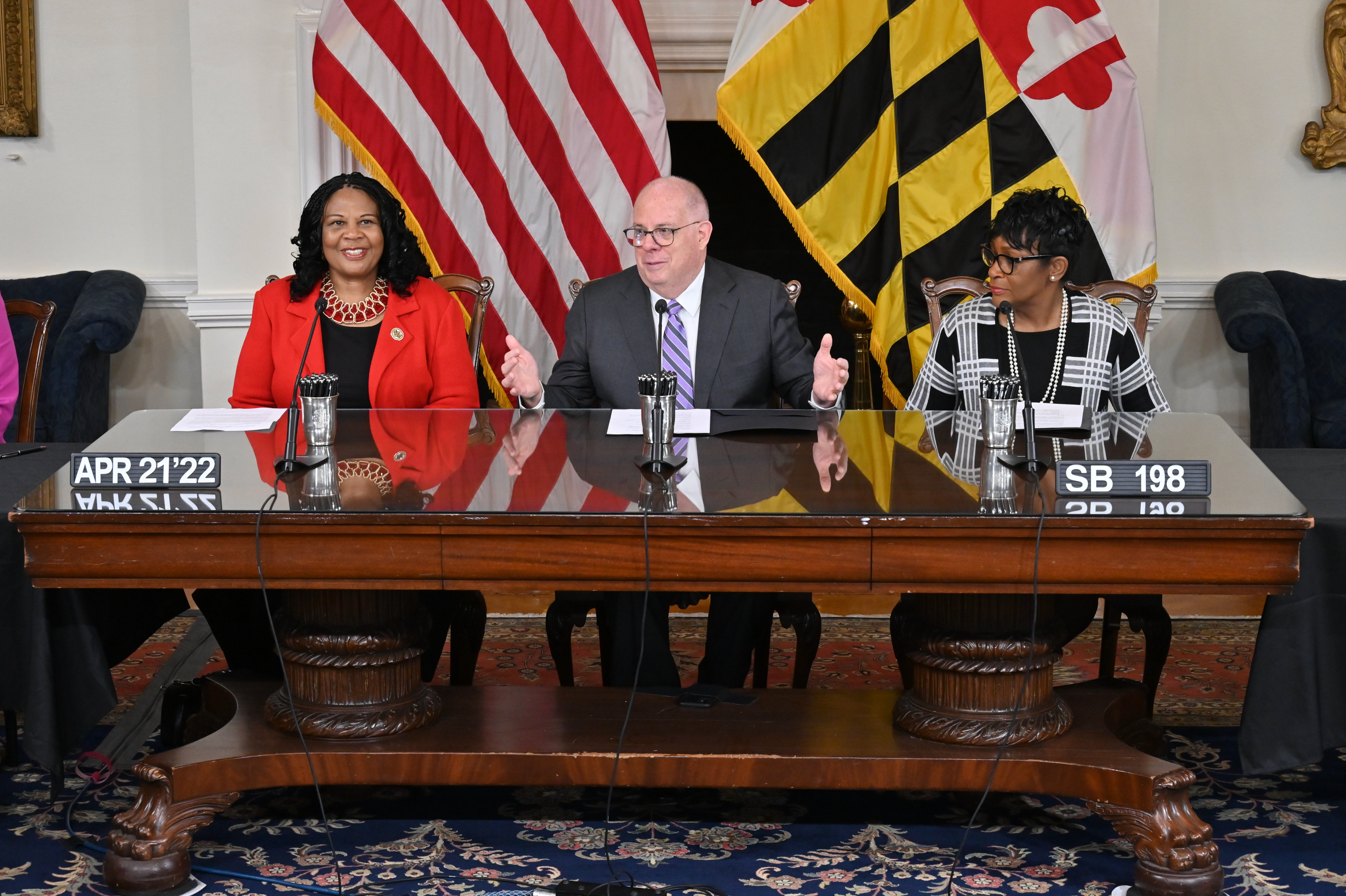
Melony G. Griffith, Larry Hogan and Adrienne A. Jones enacting Maryland law in April 2022

The Laws of Maryland comprise the session laws have been enacted by the Maryland General Assembly each year. According to the Boston College Law library, session laws are "useful in determining which laws were in force at a particular time." Unlike the Annotated Code of Maryland, the Laws of Maryland are arranged chronologically, rather than by subject. They are the state-level counterpart to the United States Statutes at Large.

== See also ==
- statutes
- session laws
- state law
- Annotated Code of Maryland
- Maryland General Assembly

== Sources ==
- "Laws of Maryland" (Document). Maryland General Assembly.
- "Research Guide #4: Using Statutes" (PDF). Boston College Law Library.
- "Finding Statutes". Georgetown University Law Library.
- "How a Bill Becomes Law". Maryland General Assembly, Department of Legislative Services. Archived from the original on 2008-02-14.
