= State of Maryland State Service Medal =

Military award in Maryland

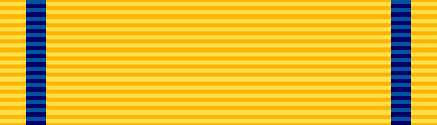

The State of Maryland State Service Medal (formerly the Maryland National Guard State Service Medal) is an award bestowed on those who have served five years continuously in any branch of the Maryland Military Department. The Bottany cross is marked with bottony devices to indicate each additional five years of continuous service up to fifty, which is marked with two gold bottonees.
