= State of Maryland Meritorious Service Medal =

Award bestowed in Maryland, U.S.

The State of Maryland Meritorious Service Medal is an award bestowed in the State of Maryland to honor meritorious service by members of the Maryland National Guard or military, active or retired.
