= State of Maryland Distinguished Service Cross =

Maryland military award

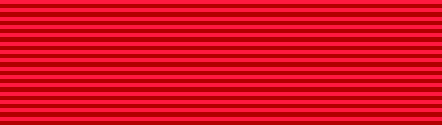
State of Maryland Distinguished Service Cross ribbon

The State of Maryland Distinguished Service Cross (SDSC) is a ribbon bestowed upon those who go above the call of duty in service to the State of Maryland. Former or current members of the Maryland National Guard and former or retired members of the military are eligible to receive the reward, which can be bestowed in honor of one major event or a series of events reflecting meritorious service. s not restricted to any specific period of time.

The function of the award was expanded in 2010, when it was modified to also serve to honor active members of the Maryland National Guard who - on or off duty - demonstrate remarkable, voluntary acts of heroism which place the member in personal danger and which go above and beyond the call of duty. The medal is marked with a valor device to indicate this usage.
