= Maryland Military Department =

Governmental division of Maryland, US

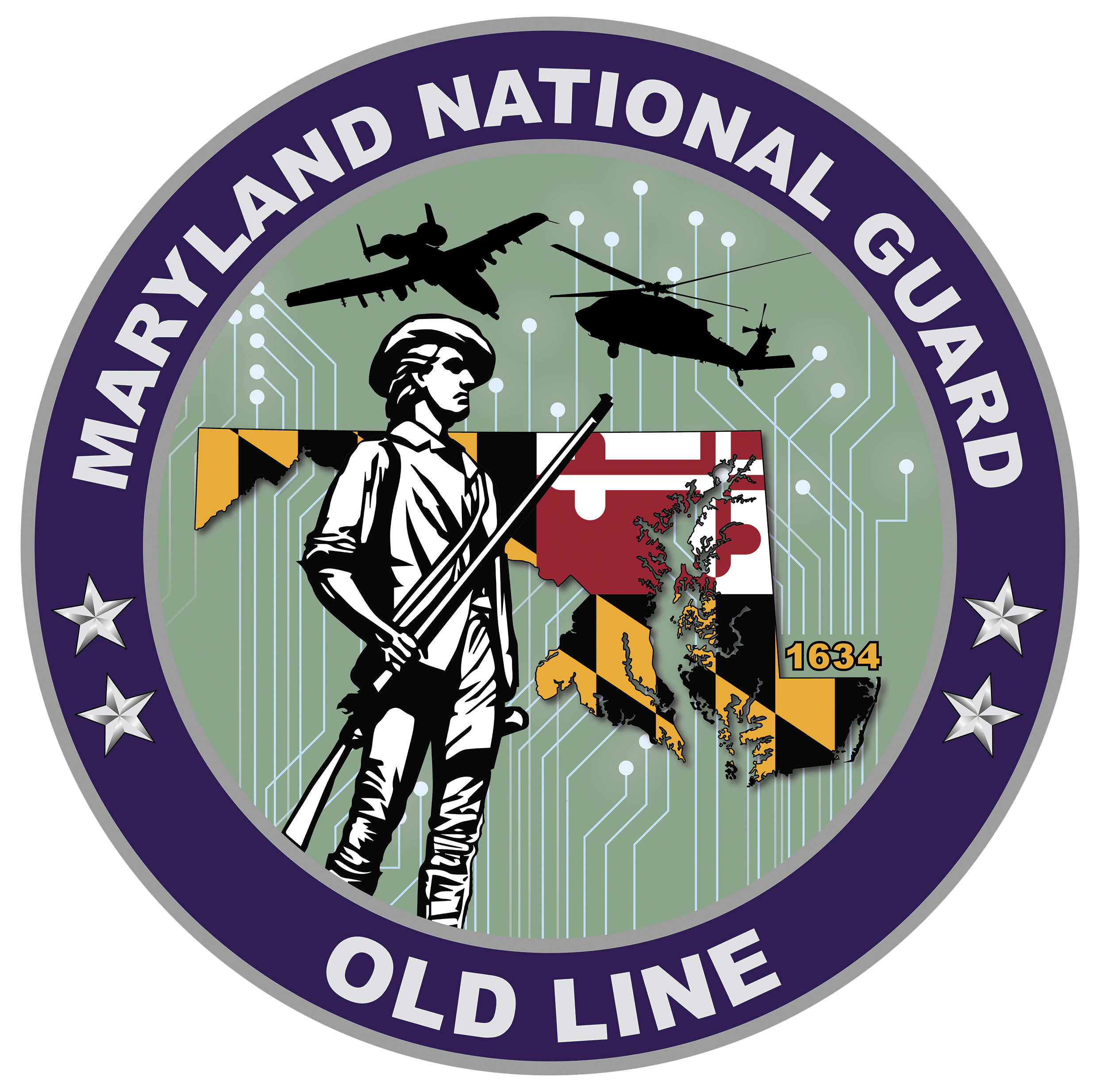
Seal of the Maryland National Guard

Flag of the Maryland National Guard

The Maryland Military Department (MMD) is a department of the State of Maryland directed by the adjutant general of Maryland.

The Maryland Military Department consists of the:

- State Operations section, which manages fiscal and administrative duties
- Maryland Army National Guard
- Maryland Air National Guard
- Maryland Defense Force

The MMD's mission is to provide supplemental services to the Maryland National Guard with the governor of Maryland as its commander-in-chief.

The Maryland Military Department is also the command authority for the defunct Maryland Naval Militia, which is part of the Maryland Militia. Under federal law, the state militia divided into the Organized Militia, currently consisting of the Maryland National Guard and Maryland Defense Force, as well as the Unorganized Militia, which consists of male citizens aged 17 to 45.
