= Awards and decorations of the State Defense Forces =

Awards and decorations of the state defense forces are presented to members of the state defense forces in addition to regular United States military decorations and state National Guard military decorations. Each of the state governments of the United States maintains a series of decorations for issuance to members of the state defense forces, with such awards presented under the authority of the various state adjutants general and/or respective state defense force commanders.

In most states, state defense force members may wear any regular United States military decorations and United States National Guard decorations that they may have earned while members of the National Guard and/or while in federal active duty service. The members of some state defense force may also be awarded state National Guard military decorations in addition to state defense force awards while serving in a state defense force capacity. The order of precedence for the wear of the awards are: federal, state National Guard, then state defense force.

Those state defense force members who subsequently serve in the active or reserve federal forces of the United States Army, Navy, Marine Corps, Coast Guard, or United States Air Force (i.e., on active duty or as members of the Army, Navy, Air Force, Marine Corps, or Coast Guard Reserves) may not continue to wear and display such decorations on a military uniform. Regulations of these federal forces allow their members to accept but not wear state National Guard awards.

The following is a list of state defense force decorations, as issued by each of the states and territories of the United States.

== Alabama ==
Alabama State Defense Force (ASDF) Awards:

- ASDF Alabama War Ribbon
- ASDF Distinguished Service Ribbon
- ASDF Meritorious Service Ribbon
- ASDF Commendation Ribbon
- ASDF Achievement Ribbon (Officer)
- ASDF Achievement Ribbon (Enlisted)
- ASDF Merit Ribbon
- ASDF Desert Shield/Storm Support Ribbon
- ASDF Disaster Readiness Ribbon
- SGT Dixie Club-Gold Ribbon
- SGT Dixie Club-Silver Ribbon
- SGT Dixie Club-Bronze Ribbon
- ASDF Service Ribbon
- ASDF Distinguished Graduate Ribbon
- ASDF Professional Development Ribbon
- ASDF Officer Training Ribbon
- ASDF Warrant Officer Training Ribbon
- ASDF NCO Training Ribbon
- ASDF C.E.R.T. Ribbon
- ASDF Recruiting Ribbon
- ASDF Super Recruiter Recruiting Ribbon
- ASDF Association Member Ribbon
- State Guard Association of the US (SGAUS) Membership Ribbon
- ASDF Outstanding Unit Comm. Ribbon
- SGAUS Superior Unit Citation
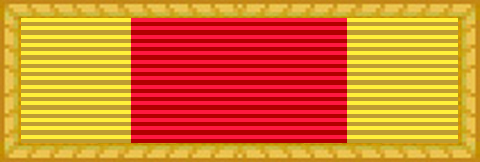
- MEMS Academy Unit Citation (obsolete; no longer used)

== Alaska ==
Alaska State Defense Force (ASDF) Awards and Decorations

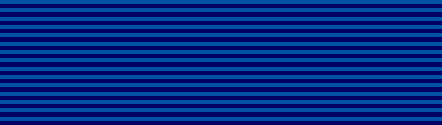
- Alaska Decoration of Honor
- Alaska Heroism Medal
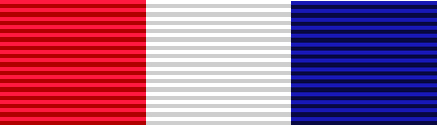
- Alaska Distinguished Service Medal
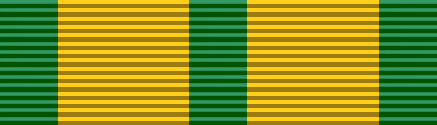
- Alaska Legion of Merit
- Alaska Meritorious Service Medal
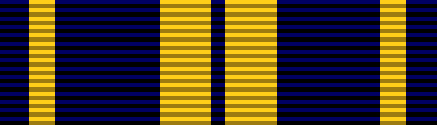
- Alaska Air Medal
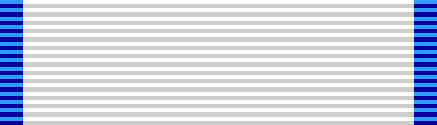
- Alaska Commendation Medal
- Alaska Achievement Medal
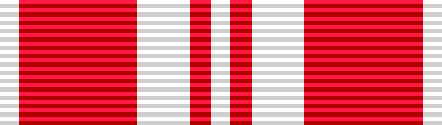
- Alaska Humanitarian Service Medal
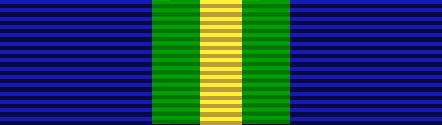
- Alaska State Service Medal
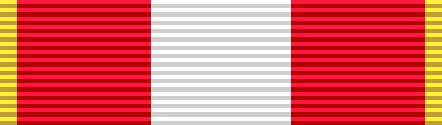
- Alaska Community Service Medal
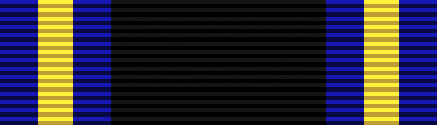
- Alaska Domestic Emergency Ribbon
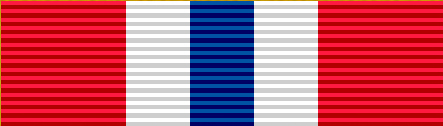
- Alaska Marksmanship Medal
- Alaska Homeland Security Medal
- Alaska Recruiting Ribbon
- Alaska State Partnership Program Ribbon
- Alaska Cold War Victory Ribbon
- Alaska Territorial Guard Medal
- Alaska State Defense Force Commendation Medal
- Alaska State Defense Force Achievement Medal
- Alaska State Defense Force State Activation Medal
- Alaska State Defense Force Service Medal
- Alaska State Defense Force Training Achievement Ribbon
- Alaska State Defense Force Good Conduct (formerly Drill Attendance) Ribbon
- State Guard Association of the United States (SGAUS) Longevity Ribbon
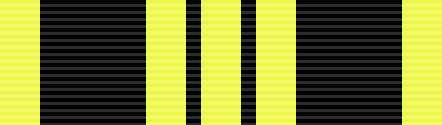
- State Guard Association of the United States (SGAUS) Professional Development Ribbon
- State Guard Association of the United States (SGAUS) Membership Ribbon

 ALASKA UNIT CITATIONS: 

- Alaska Governor's Distinguished Unit Citation
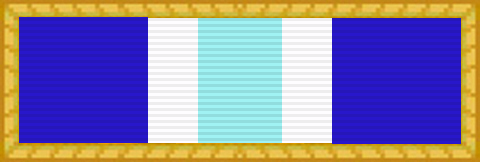
- SGAUS Meritorious Unit Citation (awarded 2014)
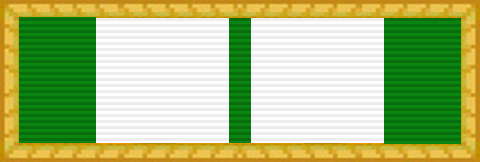
- SGAUS Superior Unit Citation (awarded 1998)

== California ==
California State Guard (formerly State Military Reserve) (CASG) Awards:

- CA SMR Military History Medal
- CA SMR Training Excellence Ribbon
- CA SMR Enlisted Excellence Ribbon
- CA SMR Recruiting Achievement Ribbon
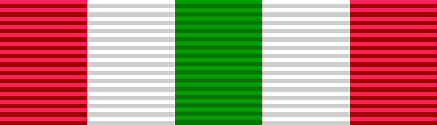
- CA SMR Professional Development Ribbon
- CA SMR Mission Qualification Ribbon
- CA SMR Emergency Training Ribbon
- CA SMR Outstanding Services Ribbon
- CA SMR Volunteer Service Ribbon
- CA SMR Drill Attendance Ribbon
- CA SMR Governor's Outstanding Unit Citation

== Georgia ==
Georgia State Defense Force (GaSDF) Awards & Decorations:

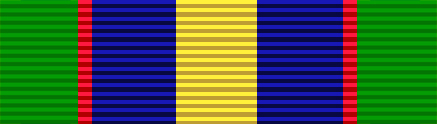
- GaSDF Medal of Valor
- GaSDF Legion of Merit (Medal)
- GaSDF Medal of Merit
- GaSDF Distinguished Service Medal
- GaSDF Commendation Medal
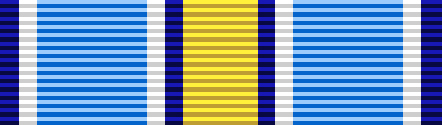
- GaSDF Enlisted Member of the Year
- GaSDF Achievement Ribbon (Class 1, 2 & 3)
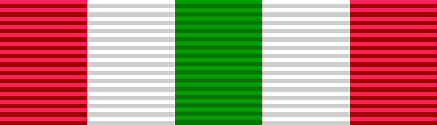
- GaSDF Military Qualification Training Ribbon
- GaSDF Military Proficiency Ribbon
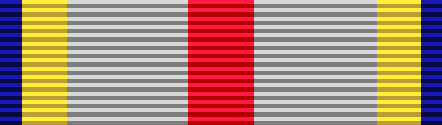
- GaSDF State Active Duty Ribbon
- GaSDF Emergency Services School Ribbon
- GaSDF Military Readiness Ribbon
- GaSDF Recruiting Achievement Ribbon
- GaSDF Volunteer Service Ribbon
- GaSDF Good Conduct Ribbon
- GaSDF Longevity Service Ribbon
- GaSDF Military Indoctrination Ribbon
- GaSDF Unit Commander's Citation w/Gold Frame
- GaSDF Outstanding Unit Citation Ribbon W/Gold Frame

== Indiana ==
Indiana Guard Reserve Awards:

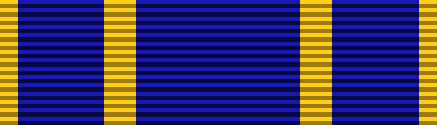
- Indiana Distinguished Service Cross (National Guard & Guard Reserve)
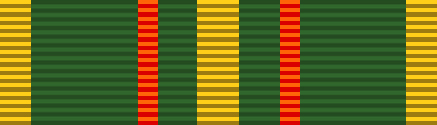
- Indiana Distinguished Service Medal (National Guard & Guard Reserve)
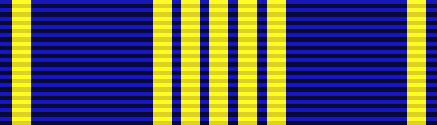
- Indiana Commendation Medal (National Guard & Guard Reserve)
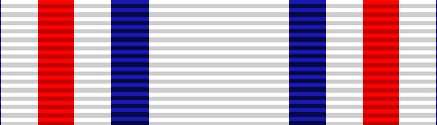
- Indiana Homeland Defense Ribbon
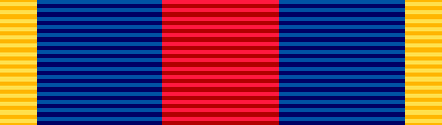
- Indiana Emergency Service Ribbon
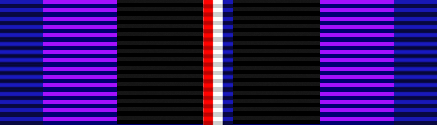
- Indiana Funeral Honors Ribbon
- INGR Merit Medal
- INGR Distinguished Service Ribbon
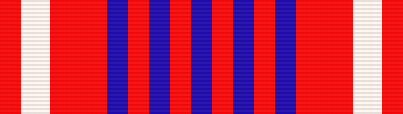
- INGR Commendation Ribbon
- INGR Achievement Ribbon
- INGR JROTC Commendation Ribbon
- INGR Outstanding Recruiter Ribbon
- INGR JROTC Support Ribbon
- INGR Community Service Ribbon
- INGR Search and Rescue Ribbon
- INGR C.E.R.T. Ribbon
- INGR Emergency Management Specialist Ribbon
- INGR Officer Professional Development Ribbon
- INGR NCO Professional Development Ribbon
- INGR Physical Fitness Ribbon
- INGR 25 Year Service Ribbon
- INGR Long Service Ribbon
- INGR Service Ribbon
- INGR Defense Service Ribbon
- INGR The Indiana Guard Reserve Association Ribbon
- INGR Superior Unit Citation
- INGR Medallion

== Maryland ==
Maryland State Defense Force (MDDF) Awards & Decorations:

- The State Of Maryland Distinguished Service Cross for Valor
- The State Of Maryland Distinguished Service Cross
- State of Maryland Meritorious Service Medal
- State Of Maryland Commendation Medal
- The Maryland Meritorious Civilian Service Medal
- Maryland National Guard Outstanding Unit Ribbon
- The Adjutant General's Special Recognition Ribbon
- Maryland Military Department Emergency Service Medal
- The Maryland National Guard Recruiting Medal
- The Maryland Military Department Overseas Service Ribbon
- State Of Maryland State Service Medal
- The Maryland Defense Force Meritorious Service Ribbon
- The Maryland Defense Force Commendation Ribbon
- The Maryland Defense Force Humanitarian Service Medal
- The Maryland Defense Force Honorable Service Ribbon (Withdrawn from the MDDF Awards Program effective 12 SEPT 2015)
- The Maryland Defense Force Achievement Ribbon
- The Maryland Defense Force Aid To Civil Authority Ribbon
- The Maryland Defense Force Community Service Ribbon
- The Maryland Defense Force Community Emergency Response Team Ribbon
- The Maryland Defense Force Professional Development Ribbon
- The Maryland Defense Force Initial Entry Training Ribbon
- The Maryland Defense Force Recruiting Ribbon
- The Maryland Defense Force Physical Fitness Ribbon
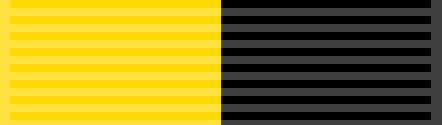
- The Maryland Defense Force Membership Ribbon
- Maryland State Guard Association MDDF Soldier of the Year Ribbon
- Maryland State Guard Association Militia Medal w/Bronze Star

== Massachusetts ==
- Mass Defense Service Ribbon
- Mass Defense Expeditionary Medal

== Mississippi ==
Mississippi State Guard (MSSG) Individual Awards:

- MSSG Distinguished Service Ribbon
- MSSG Meritorious Service Ribbon
- MSSG Commendation Ribbon
- MSSG Achievement Ribbon
- MSSG Award of Merit
- MSSG Longevity Service Ribbon
- MSSG Operation Desert Shield/Storm Service Ribbon
- MSSG Recruitment Ribbon
- MSSG Training Ribbon
- MSSG Association Membership Ribbon

Mississippi State Guard Unit Awards:

- MSSG Outstanding Unit Citation

== New Mexico ==
New Mexico State Guard (NMSG) Awards:

- New Mexico State Guard Commendation Medal
- New Mexico State Guard Achievement Medal
- New Mexico State Guard Cold War Victory Medal
- New Mexico State Guard Emergency Service Ribbon
- New Mexico State Guard Service Ribbon
- New Mexico State Guard Professional Development Ribbon
- New Mexico State Guard Superior Unit Award
- New Mexico State Guard Unit Citation

== New York ==
New York Guard (NYG) Awards:

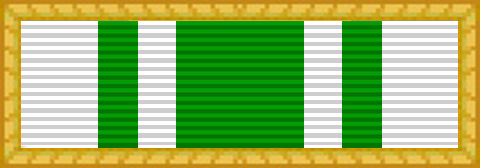
- NYG Commander's Citation
- NYG Achievement Medal
- NYG Good Conduct Medal
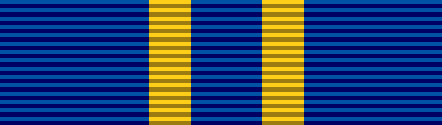
- NYG Operations Support Medal
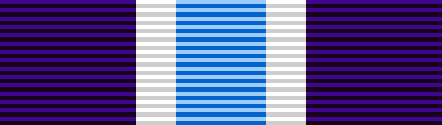
- NYG Service Ribbon
- NYG Distinguished Graduate Ribbon
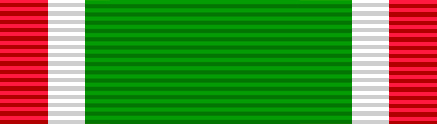
- NYG First Provisional Regiment Medal

In addition, certain New York State decorations may be awarded to New York Guard members, as well as to members of other state military components, i.e., NY Army National Guard, NY Air National Guard and NY Naval Militia. These include:

- NYS Medal of Valor
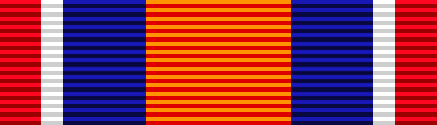
- NYS Conspicuous Service Medal
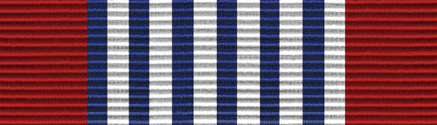
- NYS Meritorious Service Medal
- NYS Military Commendation Medal
- NYS Long and Faithful Service Medal
- NYS Defense of Liberty Medal
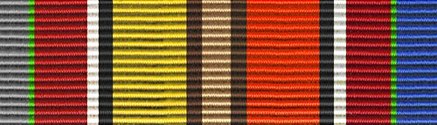
- Recruiting Medal
- New York Aid to Civil Authority Medal
- New York Counterdrug Service Ribbon
- Humane Service to NYS Medal
- NYS Physical Fitness Ribbon

== Ohio ==
Ohio Military Reserve (OHMR) Awards:

- OHMR Medal of Valor - The first recipient of this medal was LTC Mitchell E. Fadem, HAZMAT Officer for the 5th MP BDE, OHMR, in 1993 when he risked his life to monitor toxic vapor clouds inside the blast area after a chemical plant exploded in Elyria, Ohio. His efforts made it possible for the safe evacuation of 6,000 people. Fadem is now a lieutenant colonel in the US Air Force and served in Afghanistan in 2007 with the Combined Security Transition Command and in 2010 at the Headquarters of the International Security Assistance Forces in Kabul as a toxicologist and senior health care LNO with the Ministry of Public Health and Ministry of Mines. In December 2010, Fadem was awarded a Bronze Star Medal for heroism and meritorious service during his deployment to Afghanistan.
- OHMR Distinguished Service Medal
- OHMR Medal of Merit
- OHMR Purple Cross Medal
- OHMR Lifesaving Medal
- OHMR Commendation Award
- OHMR Achievement Award
- OHMR Search and Rescue Award
- OHMR Community Service Award
- OHMR Aid to Civil Authority Award
- OHMR Good Conduct Award
- OHMR Longevity Service Award
- OHMR Soldier of the Year Award
- OHMR Honor Graduate Award
- OHMR Officer Training Graduate Award
- OHMR NCO Training Graduate Award
- OHMR Basic Entry Level Training Graduate Award
- OHMR Physical Fitness Award
- OHMR Federal Service School Award
- OHMR Military Indoctrination Award
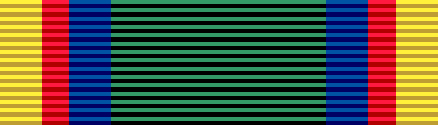
- OHMR Emergency Service Training Award
- OHMR Volunteer Service Award
- OHMR Military Award Readiness
- OHMR Recruiting Achievement Award
- OHMR Military Proficiency Award
- State Guard Association of the United States Membership Ribbon
- State Guard Association of Ohio Member Ribbon

Ohio Military Reserve (OHMR) Unit Awards:

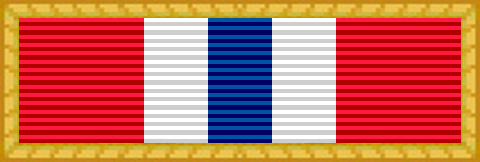
- OHMR Outstanding Unit Citation Award
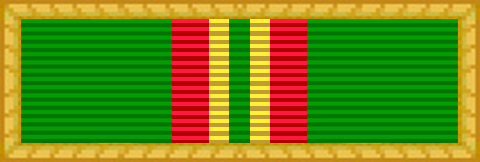
- OHMR Commanding General's Meritorious Unit Service Award

== Rhode Island ==
- Rhode Island Bronze service medal
- Rhode Island Militia Meritorious Service Medal
- Rhode Island Militia Service Medal

== South Carolina ==
South Carolina State Guard (SCSG) Awards:

- South Carolina Medal of Valor
- SCSG Distinguished Service Medal
- SCSG Medal of Merit
- SCSG Meritorious Service Medal
- SCSG Commendation Medal
- SCSG Home Defense Achievement Ribbon (not currently listed as an authorized award in SCSGR 672–1)
- SCSG Individual Achievement Ribbon
- SCSG Good Conduct Ribbon
- SCSG Longevity Service Medal
- SCSG Golden Anniversary Ribbon
- SCSG Federal Service School Ribbon
- SCSG Humanitarian Service Ribbon
- SCSG Service Ribbon
- SCSG Emergency Service Training Ribbon
- SCSG Volunteer Service Ribbon
- SCSG Honors Detail Service Ribbon
- SCSG Military Readiness Ribbon
- SCSG Recruiting Achievement Ribbon
- SCSG Military Proficiency Ribbon
- South Carolina Governor's Unit Citation
- SCSG Outstanding Unit Citation
- SCSG Unit Achievement Award

== Tennessee ==
Tennessee State Guard (TNSG) Individual Awards:

- TNSG Valor Ribbon
- TNSG Alvin C. York Ribbon
- TNSG Distinguished Service Ribbon
- TNSG Meritorious Service Ribbon
- TNSG Com. Gen. Letter of Commendation Ribbon
- TNSG Commendation Ribbon
- TNSG Wound Ribbon
- TNSG Life Saving Ribbon
- TNSG Officer Achievement Ribbon
- TNSG Enlisted Achievement Ribbon
- TNSG TN Defense Service Ribbon
- TNSG Search & Rescue Ribbon
- TNSG Aid to Civil Authority Ribbon
- TNSG Operation Desert Storm/Shield Ribbon
- TNSG Operation Enduring Freedom Ribbon
- TNSG Operation Task Force Volunteer Ribbon
- TNSG Community Volunteer Service Ribbon
- TNSG Soldier of the Year Ribbon
- TNSG Good Conduct Ribbon
- TNSG Officer Training
- TNSG NCO Training Ribbon
- TNSG Basic Entry Level Training
- TNSG Chaplain's Ribbon
- TNSG Volunteer Service Ribbon
- TNSG Recruitment Achievement Ribbon
- TNSG Recruiter's Ribbon
- TNSG Military Readiness Ribbon
- TNSG Service Ribbon

== Texas ==
Texas National Guard Awards (Awardable to Texas State Guard members:)

- Texas Legislative Medal of Honor
- Texas Medal of Valor
- Texas Purple Heart Medal
- Texas Superior Service Medal
- Texas Lone Star Distinguished Service Medal
- Texas Outstanding Service Medal
- Texas Medal of Merit (also awarded with "V" for valor)
- Texas Cold War Victory Medal
- Texas Adjutant General's Individual Award
- Texas Humanitarian Service Ribbon
- Texas Homeland Defense Service Medal
- Texas Faithful Service Medal

Texas State Guard (TXSG) Awards:

- Texas State Guard Meritorious Service Ribbon
- Texas State Guard Commanding General's Individual Award Ribbon
- Texas State Guard Recruiting Ribbon
- Texas State Guard Officer Professional Development Ribbon
- Texas State Guard NCO Professional Development Ribbon
- Texas State Guard Enlisted Personnel Basic Training Ribbon
- Texas State Guard Physical Fitness Ribbon
- Texas State Guard Service Medal

Texas State Guard Unit Awards:

- Texas Governor's Unit Citation
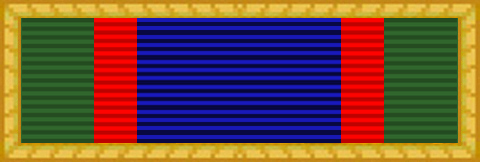
- Texas State Guard Meritorious Unit Award
- Texas State Guard Organizational Excellence Award

== Vermont ==
Vermont State Guard awards:

- Vermont Military Humanitarian Service Medal

== Virginia ==
The Virginia Defense Force awards, or has previously awarded, the following awards and decorations:

- Life Saving Medal (LSM)
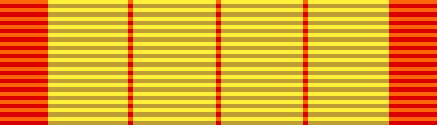
- Distinguished Service Medal (DSM)
- Meritorious Service Medal (MSM)
- Commendation Medal (CM)
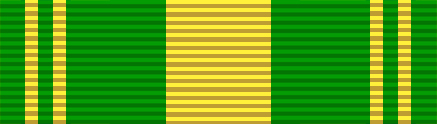
- Achievement Medal (AM)
- Active Service Ribbon (ASR)
- VDF Service Ribbon (VDFSR)
- Community Service Ribbon (CSR)
- Service Ribbon (SR)
- Recruiting and Retention Ribbon (RRR)
- Noncommissioned Officer Development Ribbon (NCODR) (obsolete)
- Response Management Staff College Completion Ribbon (obsolete)
- Operational Staff, Command, Control & Communications Course Ribbon (OSC3R) (obsolete)
- Advanced Leader Course Ribbon (ALCR) (obsolete)
- Company Leader Course Ribbon (CLCR) (obsolete)
- State Guard Association of the United States (SGAUS) Longevity Ribbon
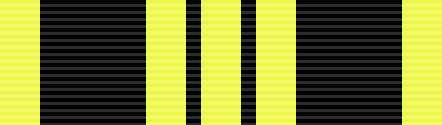
- State Guard Association of the United States (SGAUS) Professional Development Ribbon
- State Guard Association of the United States (SGAUS) Membership Ribbon
- VDF Unit Readiness Citation (Dead Eye)

== Washington ==
The Washington State Guard awards, or has previously awarded, the following awards and decorations:

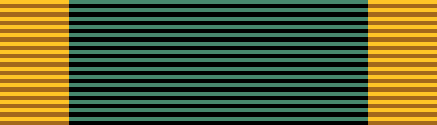
- Washington Distinguished Service Medal
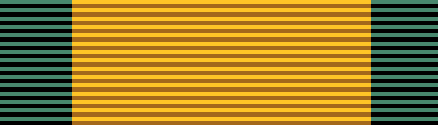
- Washington Legion of Merit Medal
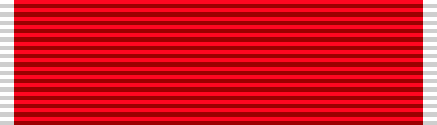
- Washington Cross of Valor
- Washington Meritorious Service Medal
- Washington Commendation Medal
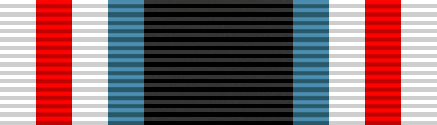
- Washington Achievement Medal
- Washington Strength Management Ribbon
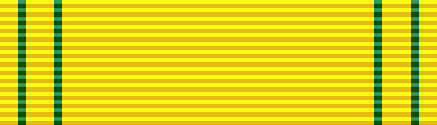
- Washington Emergency Service Ribbon
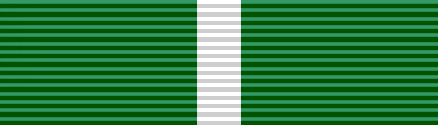
- Washington National Guard Service Ribbon
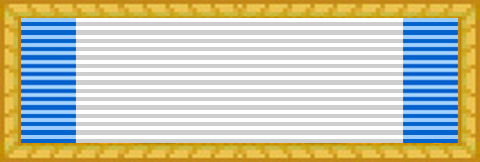
- Washington Unit Citation

== State Guard Association of the United States ==
The State Guard Association of the United States awards, or has previously awarded, the following awards and decorations:

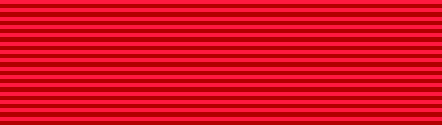
- SGAUS Presidential Service Medal
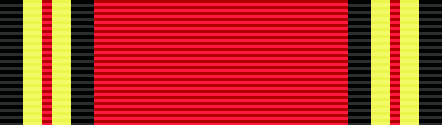
- SGAUS Distinguished Service Medal
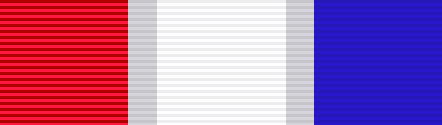
- SGAUS Medal of Merit
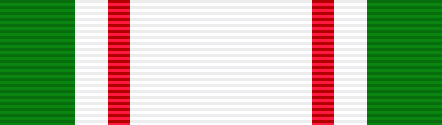
- SGAUS Meritorious Service Award
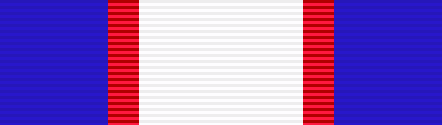
- SGAUS Commendation Medal
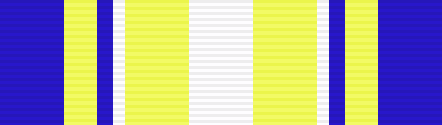
- SGAUS Achievement Medal
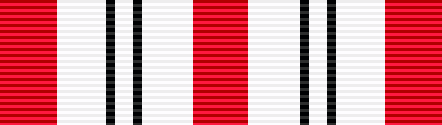
- SGAUS Faithful Service Medal
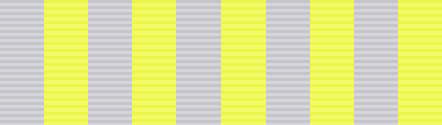
- SGAUS Recruiting Achievement Medal
- SGAUS Longevity Medal
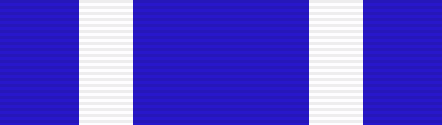
- SGAUS Military Justice Award
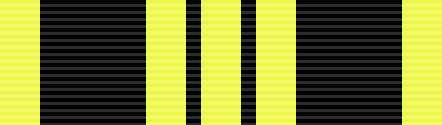
- SGAUS Professional Development Award
- SGAUS Membership Medal

SGAUS Unit awards:

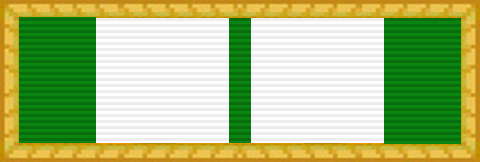
- SGAUS Superior Unit Citation
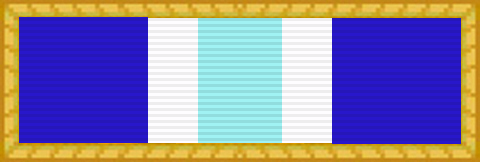
- SGAUS Meritorious Unit Citation
