= General Nichols =

General Nichols may refer to:

- Francis T. Nicholls (1834–1912), Confederate States Army brigadier general
- John F. Nichols (fl. 1970s–2010s), U.S. Air National Guard major general
- John J. Nichols (fl. 1990s–2020s), U.S. Air Force major general
- Kenneth Nichols (1907–2000), U.S. Army major general
- Moses Nichols (1740–1790), New Hampshire Militia brigadier general
- Robert L. Nichols (1922–2001), U.S. Marine Corps lieutenant general
- William Nicholls (Royal Marines officer) (1854–1935) was a Royal Marines general

== See also ==
- Abimael Youngs Nicoll (fl. 1790s–1810s), U.S. Army Adjutant General and acting Inspector General
- Edward Nicolls (c. 1779–1865), Royal Marines general
- Jasper Nicolls (1778–1849), British Army lieutenant general
