= Mexican Border Service Medal =

Decoration of the United States military

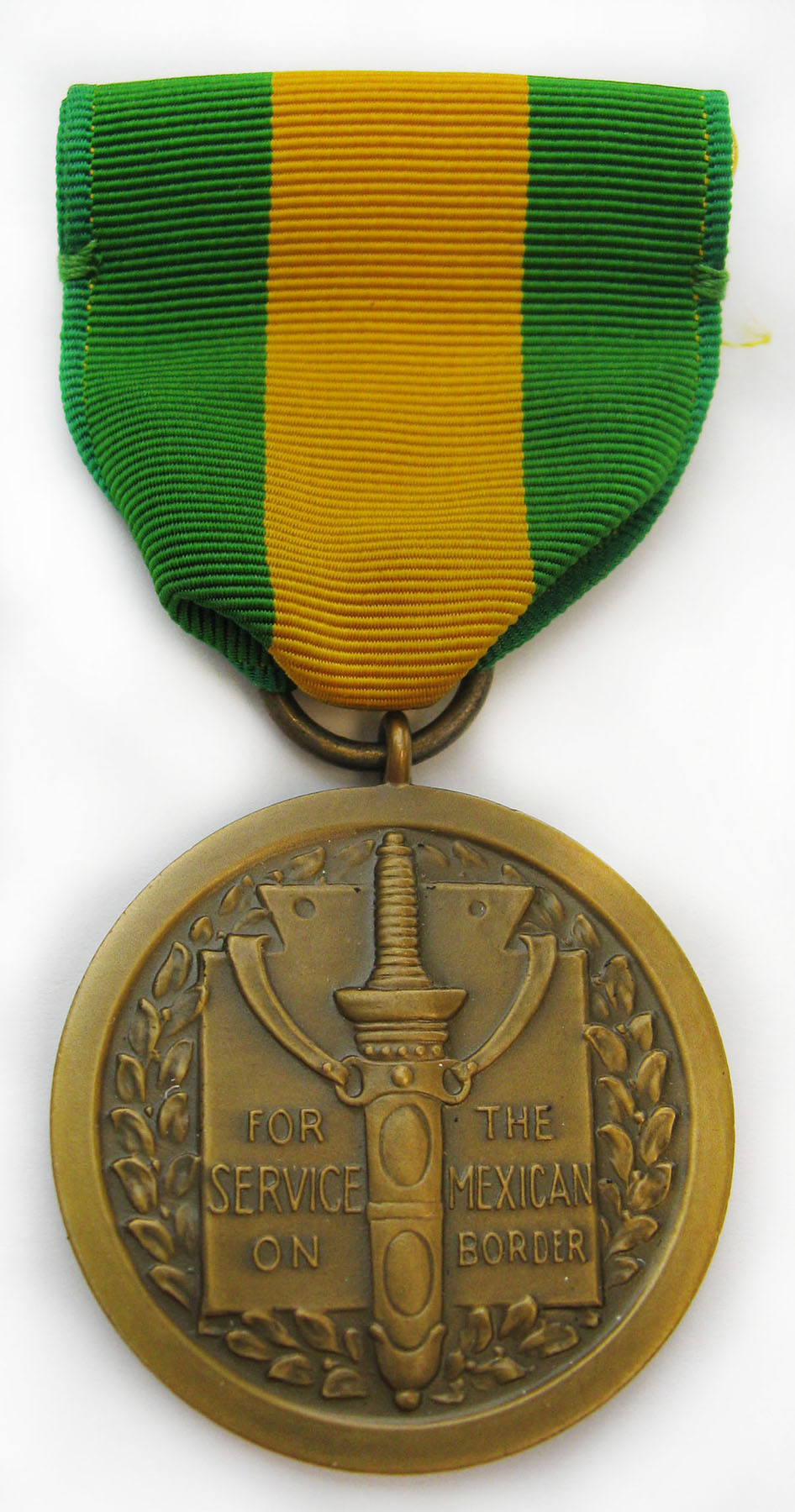
- Obverse
- Type: Military medal Service medal
- Awarded for: Any U.S. Service-members for service on the U.S.-Mexico border who did not qualify for the Mexican Service Medal.
- Country: United States
- Presented by: Secretary of War
- Status: Obsolete
- Established: July 9, 1918
- Total recipients: 41,000
- Service ribbon

Precedence
- Next (higher): Mexican Service Medal
- Next (lower): World War I Victory Medal
- Related: Texas Cavalry Medal

The Mexican Border Service Medal or Mexican Border Defense Medal was a U.S. service medal established by an Act of Congress on July 9, 1918. It was initially awarded for service on the border between May 9, 1916 and March 24, 1917. Additionally, recipients included those who performed duty with the Mexican Border Patrol between January 1, 1916 and April 6, 1917. This should not be confused with the Mexican Border Defense Medal (MBDM), a different service medal authorized in 2025 for service on the Mexico-United States border bearing the same design.

== History ==
The Mexican Border Service Medal recognized military service members who were assigned to the U.S.-Mexico border when the United States was engaged in the Pancho Villa Expedition, a military operation conducted against the paramilitary forces of Francisco "Pancho" Villa during the Mexican Revolution. The U.S.-Mexico border was a potential location for a German-funded invasion by Mexico, which was exposed by British interception of the Zimmermann telegram, a communication that detailed Germany's proposal for Mexico to ally with Germany if the United States entered World War I.

Those who received the Mexican Service Medal were not eligible for the Mexican Border Service Medal. The first recipient was Major General Charles M. Clement of Pennsylvania, in recognition of his status as the longest-tenured National Guard officer eligible for the award at the time it was authorized. Congress created a similar award for members of the Texas National Guard who served on the border between December 8, 1917 to November 11, 1918, the Texas Cavalry Medal.

== Description ==
As approved by the U.S. Congress:

The medal of bronze is 1 1/4 inches in diameter. On the obverse is a sheathed Roman sword hanging on a tablet on which is inscribed For service on the Mexican border. The tablet is surrounded by a wreath. The reverse is the same as that of the Spanish War Service Medal. The medal is suspended by a ring from a silk moire ribbon 1 3/8 inches in length and 1 3/8 inches in width composed of a green band (7/16 inch), yellow band (1/2 inch), and green band (7/16 inch).

== See also ==
- Awards and decorations of the United States military
