= John F. Nichols =

United States general

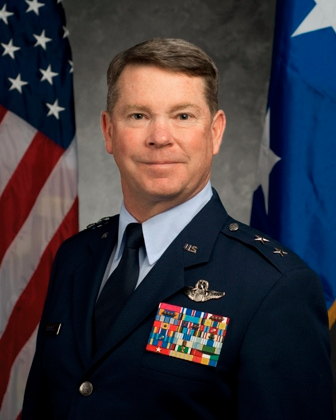
- Official portrait, 2011

51st Adjutant General of Texas
- In office February 16, 2011 – December 31, 2018
- Governor: Rick Perry; Greg Abbott
- Preceded by: Jose S. Mayorga Jr.
- Succeeded by: Tracy R. Norris

Personal details
- Education: United States Air Force Academy (BS)

Military service
- Branch/service: United States Air Force; Air National Guard
- Years of service: 1979‍–‍1992 (active); 1992‍–‍2000 (Wisconsin ANG); 2000‍–‍2019 (Texas ANG)
- Rank: Major general
- Commands: 115th Operations Group; 147th Fighter Wing; 149th Fighter Wing; Texas Military Department
- Battles/wars: Gulf War
- Awards: Distinguished Service Medal; Legion of Merit; Distinguished Flying Cross

John Frederick Nichols is a retired major general in the United States Air National Guard and the former Adjutant General of Texas.

== Career ==
Raised in Bowie, Maryland, Nichols graduated from the United States Air Force Academy in 1979. From 1989 to 1991, he was stationed at Torrejón Air Base in Spain and served in the Gulf War before being assigned to The Pentagon. In 1992, Nichols joined the Wisconsin Air National Guard and was assigned to the 128th Fighter Wing. From 1994 to 1998, he served as Operations Officer of the 176th Fighter Squadron before serving as an operations group commander at Truax Field Air National Guard Base in Madison, Wisconsin for two years. In 2000, he was named Vice Commander of the 149th Fighter Wing of the Texas Air National Guard. From 2003 until 2009, he was in command of the 149th Fighter Wing. He was named Assistant Adjutant General of the Texas Air National Guard in 2009 and stayed in that position until becoming Adjutant General of Texas in 2011.

Awards he has received include the Legion of Merit, the Distinguished Flying Cross, the Meritorious Service Medal with four oak leaf clusters, the Air Medal with four oak leaf clusters, the Aerial Achievement Medal, the Air Force Commendation Medal, the Air Force Achievement Medal, the Outstanding Unit Award with valor device and two oak leaf clusters, the Combat Readiness Medal with silver oak leaf cluster, the National Defense Service Medal with service star, the Armed Forces Expeditionary Medal, the Southwest Asia Service Medal with two service stars, the Global War on Terrorism Service Medal, the Air Force Longevity Service Award with silver oak leaf cluster, the Armed Forces Reserve Medal with hourglass device, the Small Arms Expert Marksmanship Ribbon, the Air Force Training Ribbon, the Kuwait Liberation Medal (Saudi Arabia), and the Kuwait Liberation Medal (Kuwait) Texas Lone Star Distinguished Service Medal, Texas Outstanding Service Medal, Texas Faithful Service Medal
