= Cold War Victory Medal =

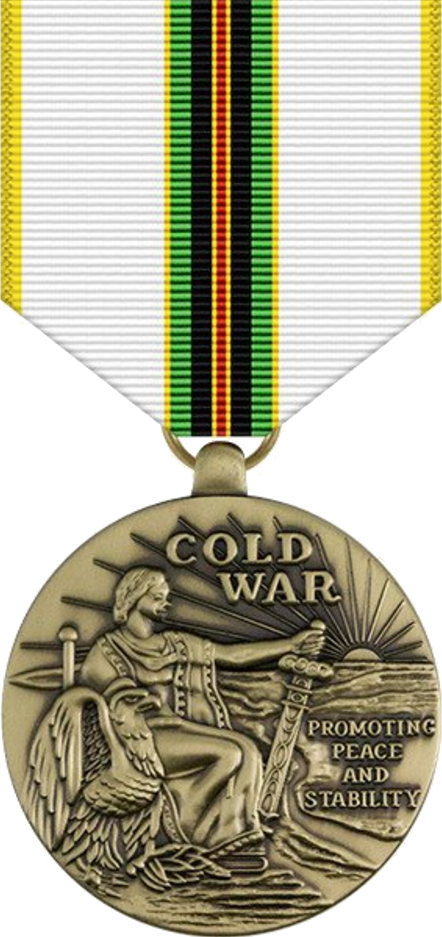
- Cold War Victory Medal
- Type: Medal
- Presented by: the U.S. National Guard, the State of Alaska, the State of Louisiana, and the State of Texas
- Eligibility: U.S. military personnel who served between September 2, 1945 and December 26, 1991
- Status: National Guard and commemorative medal for honorable service during Cold War
- First award: February 1, 2000 (retroactive to September 2, 1945)
- First ribbon is awarded by both Alaska and Louisiana. The second ribbon is awarded by Texas.

Precedence
- Next (higher): U.S. marksmanship, training and development awards (Note: Veterans may wear commemorative medal on public holidays. However, it is not authorized for wear on active duty uniform. The medal may be worn only on civilian attire and only after other authorized awards.); U.S. National Guard; Alaska Air Medal; Louisiana War Cross
- Next (lower): Alaska Commendation Medal; Louisiana Emergency Service Medal

The Cold War Victory Medal is a state-level military campaign medal authorized by some states for wear by the National Guard and state defense forces, for those members who served in their positions honorably during the years of the Cold War, defined as lasting from September 2, 1945 to December 26, 1991. It is not an official medal of the United States federal government. In the medal's unofficial capacity it can be purchased, but not worn in uniform.

== Background and history ==
In accordance with section 1084 of the National Defense Authorization Act for fiscal year 1998, Congress commended the members of the Armed Forces and civilian personnel who contributed to the victory of the Western Alliance in the Cold War, and authorized and instructed the then-Secretary of Defense, William Cohen, to prepare a certificate recognizing the Cold War service of qualifying members of the Armed Forces and civilian personnel of the Department of Defense and other government agencies. The certificate became known as the Cold War Recognition Certificate available by request of the individual by all members of the armed forces and qualified federal government civilian personnel who honorably served the United States anytime during the Cold War, which is defined as September 2, 1945 to December 26, 1991.

In October 2001, Congress passed the National Defense Authorization Act (NDAA) for fiscal year 2002, which is signed into law on December 28, 2001 by President George W. Bush. In the NDAA approved by both houses and signed into law by the president, was a Sense of the Congress resolution that the Secretary of Defense should consider authorizing the issuance of a Campaign medal, to be known as the Cold War Service Medal, to each person who while a member of the Armed Forces served satisfactorily on active duty during the Cold War. The then-Secretary of Defense, Donald Rumsfeld, did not create such a medal.

The official U.S. Navy web page states: "The Department of Defense will not be creating a Cold War Service medal" and that any commemorative medals made by private vendors are unauthorized on the military uniform. At present the Cold War Victory Medal remains strictly commemorative and is unofficial other than for members of the Louisiana National Guard (medal and ribbon), Texas National Guard (medal and ribbon) and Alaska National Guard (ribbon only) .

The Cold War Victory Medal is also referred to as the Cold War Commemorative Medal, Cold War Service Medal, or simply as the Cold War Medal. There are no devices or attachments authorized for the Cold War Victory Medal.

== Design ==
The Cold War Victory Medal was designed by Nadine Russell, the Chief of Creative Heraldry at the Army's Institute of Heraldry and the designer of many campaign and service medals, including the Southwest Asia Service Medal, the Armed Forces Service Medal, and the Military Outstanding Volunteer Service Medal.

== National Guard awards medal ==
The National Guard Bureau does not issue nor recognize the Cold War Victory Medal. The medal is worn as a National Guard award and issued by the Louisiana National Guard. The Adjutant General of the State of Louisiana currently authorizes the decoration as the "Louisiana Cold War Victory Medal". Eligible members, including active duty members, of the Louisiana National Guard are authorized to wear the medal in uniform while in the State of Louisiana and not on federal property in that state (e.g., Fort Polk).

The Alaska National Guard has authorized the Cold War Victory Ribbon as the Alaska Cold War Service Ribbon, and authorized it for wear on the military uniforms for the Alaska Army National Guard, Alaska Air National Guard, the Alaska Naval Militia, and the Alaska State Defense Force. Wear of the medal form of this award is optional, in that the state does not provide the medal, only the ribbon. Authorized recipients of the ribbon may purchase and wear the medal (full size or miniature) at their own expense, but consistent when wear of medals is directed, such as the Governor's Annual Dinner.

== State defense force award ==
Texas Cold War Medal

Several state defense forces have authorized wear of the award for members who meet the requirements. The Alaska State Defense Force, the New Mexico State Guard, and the Texas State Guard have authorized the award for wear on their uniforms.

== Various commemorative versions of the medal ==
The Cold War Victory Medal is also a civilian medal which may be privately purchased but is not distributed by the United States government. As such, the decoration is not presently authorized for wear on active duty military uniforms. However, the medal has been officially adopted by the Military Order of Foreign Wars of the United States and is thus frequently worn by U.S. military retirees, veterans and civilians on public holidays, parades and veterans functions. In this regard, the order of precedence of the Cold War Victory Medal is immediately after the lowest authorized U.S. award.

There are various versions of the medal privately struck by many different vendors. However, the only version which has been officially adopted by the Military Order of Foreign Wars has been the Cold War Victory Medal designed by Nadine Russell of the Institute of Heraldry. It has also been officially adopted by the American Cold War Veterans organization. The Germany Defense Veterans of America has also adopted and authorized this medal to all the members of the Germany Defense Veterans of America as this organization's wear of medals on the GDVA uniform.

== Bills introduced in Congress to enact authorization to wear medal ==
Over the years bills have been introduced in five separate Congresses for the authorization of a Cold War Victory Medal or Cold War Service Medal. To date bills have successfully passed both houses but get stripped out in committee. All medal bills have been opposed by the U.S. Department of Defense, as it would overlap with service and campaign medals already issued for the Vietnam War and the Korean War, as well as the costs of issuing millions of medals to eligible veterans. On February 17, 2011, Senator Olympia Snowe (ME) and on May 24, 2011, Representative Steve Israel (NY-2) reintroduced legislation in the Senate and House, respectively, that the Secretary of Defense concerned may issue a service medal, to be known as the `Cold War Service Medal', to Cold War veterans who meet the criteria.

=== Bills in the United States Senate ===
Congress	Cold War Medal Bill number	Sponsor	Co-Sponsor	Notes
112th Congress (2011–2012)	S.402	Olympia Snowe (ME)	Scott Brown (MA), Susan Collins (ME), Tim Johnson (SD), John Kerry (MA), Robert Menendez (NJ), Jim Webb (VA)	6 Co-Sponsors
111th Congress (2009–2010)	S.2743	Olympia Snowe (ME)	Russ Feingold (WI), John Kerry (MA), Paul G. Kirk (MA), Mary Landrieu (LA), Blanche Lincoln (AR), Robert Menendez (NJ), Mike Johanns (NE), Jim Webb (VA)	8 Co-Sponsors
110th Congress (2007–2008)	S.AMDT. 2163 to H.R.1585	Hillary Clinton (NY)	Susan Collins (ME), Blanche Lincoln (AR)	2 Co-Sponsors
110th Congress (2007–2008)	S.1097	Hillary Clinton (NY)	Susan Collins (ME), Chuck Schumer (NY), Mary Landrieu (LA), Olympia Snowe (ME)	4 Co-Sponsors
110th Congress (2007–2008)	S.1763	Hillary Clinton (NY)	Blanche Lincoln (AR), Olympia Snowe (ME)	2 Co-Sponsors
109th Congress (2005–2006)	S.AMDT.4212 to S.2766	Hillary Clinton (NY)	None	0 Co-Sponsors
109th Congress (2005–2006)	S.1351	Hillary Clinton (NY)	Blanche Lincoln (AR), Dick Durbin (IL) Tim Johnson (SD)	3 Co-Sponsors
108th Congress (2003–2004)	S.1841	Hillary Clinton (NY)	Blanche Lincoln (AR), Dick Durbin (IL) Mark Pryor (AR)	3 Co-Sponsors
108th Congress (2003–2004)	H.R.3388	See H.R. 3388 below	David Vitter (LA)	David Vitter Co-Sponsored H.R. 3388 as Congressman from Louisiana's 1st district and is currently a US Senator from Louisiana.
107th Congress (2001–2002)	H.R.2165	See H.R. 2165 below	Lindsey Graham (SC)	Lindsey Graham Co-Sponsored H.R.2165 as Congressman from South Carolina's 3rd district and is currently a US Senator from South Carolina.
106th Congress (1999–2000)	S.AMDT.474 to S.1059	Phil Gramm (TX)	Kay Bailey Hutchison (TX), John Ashcroft (MO), Paul Coverdell (GA), Trent Lott (MS)	4 Co-Sponsors
105th Congress (1997–1998)	S.AMDT.743 to S.936	Larry Craig (ID)	None	0 Co-Sponsors

=== List of 12 senators who have supported the enactment of the medal ===
State	Senator	107th Congress (2001–2002)	108th Congress (2003–2004)	109th Congress (2005–2006)	110th Congress (2007–2008)		111th Congress (2009–2010)	112th Congress (2011–2012)
AR	Mark Pryor		S.1841					
IL	Dick Durbin		S.1841	S.1351				
KS	Jerry Moran			H.R.2568				
LA	Mary Landrieu				S.1097		S.2743	
LA	David Vitter		H.R.3388					
MA	John Kerry						S.2743	S.402
ME	Susan Collins				S.1097	S.AMDT. 2163 to H.R.1585		S.402
NE	Mike Johanns						S.2743	
NJ	Robert Menendez						S.2743	S.402
NY	Chuck Schumer				S.1097			
SC	Lindsey Graham	H.R.2165						
SD	Tim Johnson			S.1351				S.402

=== Bills in the U.S. House of Representatives ===
Congress	Cold War Medal Bill number	Sponsor	Co-Sponsor	Notes
112th Congress (2011–2012)	H.R.1968	Steve Israel (NY-2)	Jason Altmire (PA-4), Timothy Bishop (NY-1), Judy Chu, (CA-32), Gerald Connolly (VA-11), Joseph (Joe) Courtney (CT-2), Jeff Fortenberry (NE-01), Jim Gerlach (PA-6), Richard L. Hanna (NY-24), Nan Hayworth (NY-19), Maurice Hinchey (NY-22), Marcy Kaptur (OH-9), Jim McGovern (MA-3), David McKinley (WV-1), Michael Michaud (ME-2), Timothy F. Murphy (PA-18), William Lewis Owens (NY-23), Chellie Pingree (ME-1), Todd Russell Platts (PA-19), Nick Rahall (WV-3)	19 Co-Sponsors
111th Congress (2009–2010)	H.R.4051	Steve Israel (NY-2)	Jason Altmire (PA-4), Michael Arcuri (NY-24), Dan Boren (OK-2), Rick Boucher (VA-9), Bob Brady (PA-1), Christopher Carney (PA-10), Joseph (Joe) Courtney (CT-2), Mark Critz (PA-12), Kathleen Dahlkemper (PA-3), Geoff Davis (KY-4), Bill Delahunt (MA-10), Jo Ann Emerson (MO-08), Chaka Fattah (PA-2), Bob Filner (CA-51), Virginia Foxx (NC-5), Jim Gerlach (PA-6), Brian Higgins (NY-27), Maurice Hinchey (NY-22), Paul Hodes (NH-2), Mark Kirk (IL-10), Tom Latham (IA-4), Sheila Jackson-Lee (TX-18), Thaddeus McCotter (MI-11), Jim McGovern (MA-03), Mike McIntyre (NC-7), Michael McMahon (NY-13), Michael H. Michaud (ME-2), Timothy F. Murphy (PA-18), John Murtha (PA-12), Bill Pascrell (NJ-8), Collin Peterson (MN-7), Pedro Pierluisi (PR), Chellie Pingree (ME-1), Ciro Rodriguez (TX-23), Todd Russell Platts (PA-19), Ted Poe (TX-2), Mike Ross (AR-4), Joe Sestak (PA-7), Betty Sutton (OH-13), Glenn "G.T." Thompson (PA-5), Mac Thornberry (TX-13), Ginny Brown-Waite (FL-5), Joe Wilson (SC-2), Robert Wittman (VA-1), Frank Wolf (VA-10), Fred Upton (MI-6)	46 Co-Sponsors
110th Congress (2007–2008)	None	None	None	
109th Congress (2005–2006)	H.R.2568	Rob Andrews (NJ-1)	Rick Boucher (VA-9), Jo Ann Davis (VA-1), Phil English (PA-3), Bob Filner (CA-51), Virgil Goode (VA-5), Bart Gordon (TN-6), Maurice Hinchey (NY-22), Sheila Jackson-Lee (TX-18), Randy Kuhl (NY-29), Thaddeus McCotter (MI-11), Dennis Moore (KS-3), Jerry Moran (KS-1), Todd Platts (PA-19), Nick Rahall (WV-3), Silvestre Reyes (TX-16), Rob Simmons (CT-2), Bart Stupak (MI-1)	17 Co-Sponsors
108th Congress (2003–2004)	H.R.3388	Thomas Tancredo (CO-6)	Phil English (PA-3), Jim Gerlach (PA-6), Bart Gordon (TN-6), Mark Green (WI-8), Jim Leach (IA-2), Thaddeus McCotter (MI-11), Mike Michaud (ME-2), Dennis Moore (KS-3), Jim Moran (VA-8), Marilyn Musgrave (CO-4), Jim Ryun (KS-2), John Shimkus (IL-19), David Vitter (LA-1), Joe Wilson (SC-2)	14 Co-Sponsors
108th Congress (2003–2004)	H.R.3201	Rob Andrews (NJ-1)	Rick Boucher (VA-9), Ben Chandler (KY-6), Jim Gerlach (PA-6), Mike Honda (CA-15), Jim McDermott (WA-7), Jim McGovern (MA-3), Todd Platts (PA-19)	7 Co-Sponsors
107th Congress (2001–2002)	H.R.3417	Ron Paul (TX-14)	Virgil Goode (VA-5)	1 Co-Sponsor
107th Congress (2001–2002)	H.R.2165	Floyd Spence (SC-2)	Cass Ballenger (NC-10), Roscoe Bartlett (MD-6), Gus Bilirakis (FL-9), Kevin Brady (TX-8), Steve Buyer (IN-4), Ed Bryant (TN-7), Howard Coble (NC-6), Randy Cunningham (CA-51), Jim Gibbons (NV-2), Lindsey Graham (SC-3), Van Hilleary (TN-4), David L. Hobson (OH-7), Nancy Johnson (CT-6), Sam Johnson (TX-3), Ken Lucas (KY-4), Ray LaHood (IL-18), Jim McGovern (MA-3), Cynthia McKinney (GA-4), Michael Oxley (OH-4), Joseph R. Pitts (PA-16), Jim Ryun (KS-2), Jim Saxton (NJ-3), Edward Schrock (VA-2), Rob Simmons (CT-2), John Spratt (SC-5)	25 Co-Sponsors
106th Congress (1999–2000)	H.R.2440	Rick Lazio (NY-2)	None	0 Co-Sponsors

=== List of 42 representatives plus 1 delegate to congress who have supported the enactment of the medal ===
State	Representative	107th Congress (2001–2002)	108th Congress (2003–2004)			109th Congress (2005–2006)	110th Congress (2007–2008)	111th Congress (2009–2010)	112th Congress (2011–2012)
CA-15	Mike Honda		H.R.3201						
CA-32	Judy Chu								H.R.1968
CT-02	Joseph (Joe) Courtney							H.R.4051	H.R.1968
FL-09	Gus Bilirakis	H.R.2165							
IA-04	Tom Latham							H.R.4051	
IL-19	John Shimkus			H.R.3388					
MA-03	Jim McGovern	H.R.2165		H.R.3201				H.R.4051	H.R.1968
ME-01	Chellie Pingree							H.R.4051	H.R.1968
ME-02	Mike Michaud			H.R.3388				H.R.4051	H.R.1968
MI-06	Fred Upton							H.R.4051	
MN-07	Collin Peterson							H.R.4051	
NC-05	Virginia Foxx							H.R.4051	
NC-06	Howard Coble	H.R.2165							
NC-07	Mike McIntyre							H.R.4051	
NE-01	Jeff Fortenberry								H.R.1968
NJ-01	Rob Andrews		H.R.3201			H.R.2568			
NJ-08	Bill Pascrell							H.R.4051	
NY-01	Timothy Bishop								H.R.1968
NY-02	Steve Israel				H.R.5112			H.R.4051	H.R.1968
NY-23	William Lewis Owens								H.R.1968
NY-24	Richard L. Hanna								H.R.1968
NY-27	Brian Higgins							H.R.4051	
OH-09	Marcy Kaptur								H.R.1968
PA-01	Bob Brady							H.R.4051	
PA-02	Chaka Fattah							H.R.4051	
PA-05	Glenn "G.T." Thompson							H.R.4051	
PA-06	Jim Gerlach		H.R.3201	H.R.3388				H.R.4051	H.R.1968
PA-16	Joseph R. Pitts	H.R.2165							
PA-18	Timothy F. Murphy							H.R.4051	H.R.1968
SC-02	Joe Wilson			H.R.3388				H.R.4051	
TX-02	Ted Poe							H.R.4051	
TX-03	Sam Johnson	H.R.2165							
TX-08	Kevin Brady	H.R.2165							
TX-13	Mac Thornberry							H.R.4051	
TX-18	Sheila Jackson-Lee					H.R.2568		H.R.4051	
VA-01	Robert Wittman							H.R.4051	
VA-08	Jim Moran			H.R.3388					
VA-10	Frank Wolf							H.R.4051	
VA-11	Gerald Connolly								H.R.1968
WA-07	Jim McDermott		H.R.3201						
WV-01	David McKinley								H.R.1968
WV-03	Nick Rahall					H.R.2568			H.R.1968
Delegate to Congress
Puerto Rico	Pedro Pierluisi							H.R.4051	
