= Mexican Border Defense Medal =

Award of the United States military

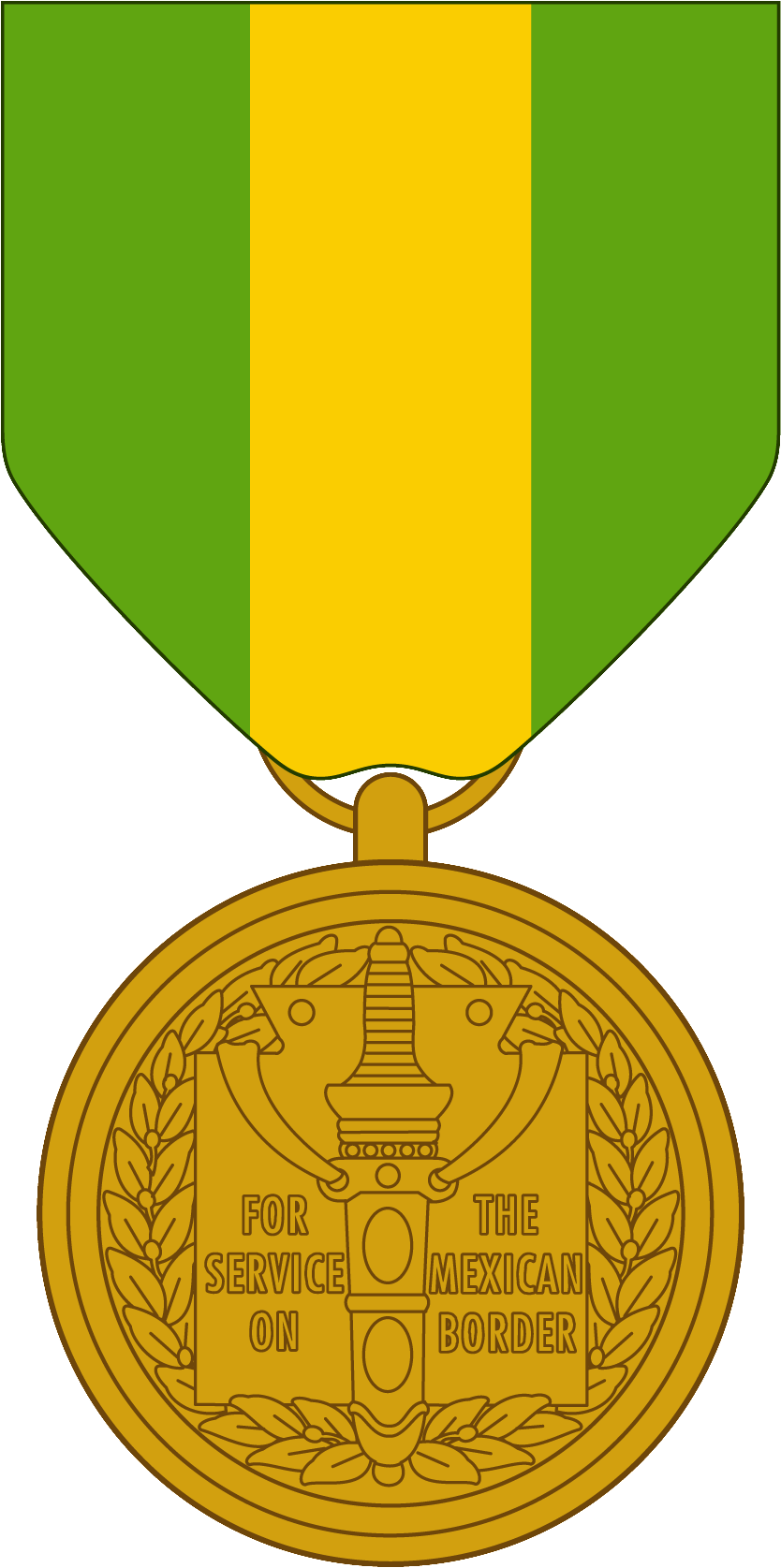
- Obverse
- Type: Military medal Service medal
- Eligibility: U.S. military personnel
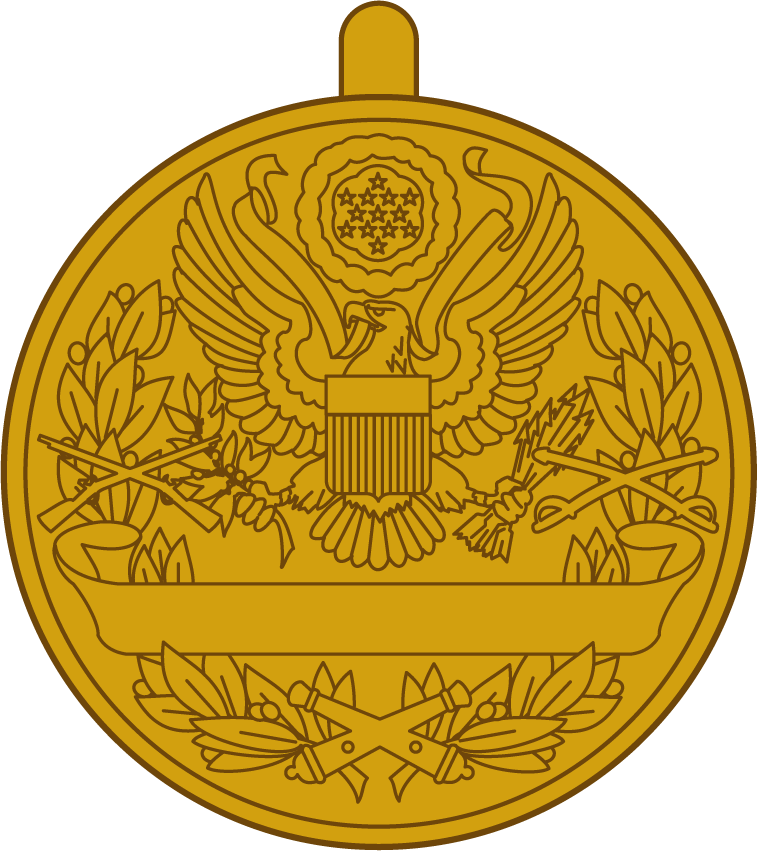
- Reverse
- Status: Currently Awarded
- Established: 2025
- The ribbon

Precedence
- Next (higher): Korean Defense Service Medal
- Next (lower): Armed Forces Service Medal

The Mexican Border Defense Medal (MBDM) was established by a memorandum of the United States Department of Defense on August 13, 2025, for US military service members who have deployed to the southern US border backdated to January 20, 2025, in support of the US Customs and Border Protection Agency (CBP). This should not be confused with the Mexican Border Service Medal, a different service medal for service during 1916 and 1917 on the Mexico-United States border bearing the same design.

Since 2019, US military service members were awarded the Armed Forces Service Medal (AFSM) for duty at the southern US border. Under the 2019 policy, troops had to serve within 115 miles of the southern US border in any of the four states that border Mexico as well as headquarters troops serving in San Antonio, Texas. This policy included Operation Jump Start and Operation Guardian Support.

The original concept of a new medal began with Rep. Tim Moore, R-North Carolina, who sponsored H.R. 3780 (119th Congress) on June 6, 2025, calling for a Border Operations Service Medal. "A country without secure borders is a country in name only. These heroes are on the front lines defending the American people from violent cartels, human traffickers, terrorists, and mass illegal crossings...they don’t ask for recognition, but they’ve more than earned it," said Moore.

On March 14, 2025, US Northern Command (USNORTHCOM) created Joint Task Force-Southern Border and more than 8,500 military service members have served with it in various roles.

On December 15, 2025 President Donald Trump awarded the first 13 medals to soldiers and marines at a ceremony in the Oval Office. Those service members who attended the ceremony were chosen to represent the 25,000 others who have qualified for the MBDM.

== Criteria ==
The new award will be limited to US service members assigned, attached or detailed to a unit deployed as part of a designated operation supporting CBP for 30 days within 100 miles of the US-Mexico border or 24 nautical miles in adjacent US waters. US Service members, both active and veterans who received the AFSM can apply to receive the new award, but they cannot receive both awards for the same period of service. The memorandum states that the new award will fall in the precedence order after the Korean Defense Service Medal and before the Armed Forces Service Medal.

In May of 2026, the U.S. Marine Corps issued its own eligibility criteria (MARADMIN 233/26) under which Marine commanders now have the authority to award the MBDM outside of the DoD. In June of 2026 the U.S. Navy issued eligibility criteria (NAVADMIN 143/26) under which Navy personnel assigned to the border mission, supporting the U.S. Customs and Border Protection Agency for 30 consecutive days are eligible for the award.

== Appearance ==
On August 22, 2025, a design for the new award was uploaded to the online database of the US Army Institute of Heraldry. This design is identical to the previous Mexican Border Service Medal, an award created in 1918 for US troops engaged in military operations against Francisco "Pancho" Villa. The bronze medal depicts a keystone tablet with a Roman gladius (short sword) hanging from it. The tablet is surrounded by laurel wreaths and is inscribed with the words "For Service On The Mexican Border." The reverse side is the Coat of Arms of the United States above a scroll and surrounded by a wreath ending at the center with cross rifles in dexter, crossed sabers in sinister and crossed cannons in base.

== See also ==
- Awards and decorations of the United States military
