= Korea Defense Service Medal =

Award of the United States military

- Obverse
- Type: Military medal Service medal
- Awarded for: Service for at least 30 consecutive days or 60 non-consecutive days in support of the defense of South Korea.
- Presented by: U.S. Department of Defense and U.S. Department of Homeland Security
- Eligibility: U.S. military personnel
- Reverse
- Status: Current
- Established: December 2002; 23 years ago
- First award: February 2003 (retroactive to July 28, 1954)
- The ribbon

Precedence
- Next (higher): Global War on Terrorism Service Medal
- Next (lower): Mexican Border Defense Medal (2025)

The Korea Defense Service Medal (KDSM) is a military service medal of the United States Armed Forces that was first created in 2002 when it was signed into law by President George W. Bush. The bill to create the proposal was introduced and championed by Rep. Elton Gallegly (R-CA) and Sen. Jeff Bingaman (D-NM). Several designs for the medal were proposed; the selected design was done by John Sproston.

Those awarded the medal are eligible for membership in the Veterans of Foreign Wars (VFW) as well as the American Legion.

== Criteria ==
The Korea Defense Service Medal is authorized for those members of the United States Armed Forces who have served duty in South Korea in support of the defense of the South Korean state after the signing of the Korean Armistice Agreement. To qualify for the KDSM, a service member must have served at least thirty consecutive days in the South Korean theater. The medal is also granted for 60 non-consecutive days of service, which includes reservists on annual training in South Korea.

Exceptions are made for the 30/60 days time requirement if a service member participated in a combat armed engagement, was wounded or injured in the line of duty requiring medical evacuation, or participated as a regularly assigned aircrew member in flying sorties which totaled more than 30 days of duty in South Korean airspace. In such cases, the KDSM is authorized regardless of time served in theater.

The Korea Defense Service Medal is retroactive to the end of the Korean War and is granted to any service performed after July 28, 1954. The National Personnel Records Center is responsible for verifying entitlement of the KDSM to discharged members of the military who served in South Korea prior to the creation of the KDSM.

As an official U.S. Department of Defense exception to policy, service members may be entitled to both the Armed Forces Expeditionary Medal, and the KDSM for participation in operations in South Korea during the same timeframe between October 1, 1966 and June 30, 1974.

Only one award of the Korea Defense Service Medal is authorized, regardless of the amount of time served in the South Korean theater.

== Appearance ==
The Korea Defense Service Medal is a bronze medal 1 1/4 inches (32 mm) in diameter. The obverse bears a Korean "circle dragon", surrounded by a scroll inscribed KOREA DEFENSE SERVICE. In an earlier design of the medal, the scroll is inscribed KOREA DEFENSE SERVICE MEDAL. At the base of the medal are two sprigs, laurel on the left and bamboo on the right. The reverse bears an outline of the Korean Peninsula surmounted by two crossed swords, pointed up. Around the edge is a decorative circlet with five points.

The ribbon for the Korea Defense Service Medal is predominantly green and 1 3/8 inches (35 mm) wide. In the center is a 1/4 inch (6.4 mm) ultramarine blue stripe, flanked by 1/16 inch (1.6 mm) stripes of golden yellow and white, spaced 3/32 inch (2.4 mm) apart.

== See also ==
- Military of South Korea
