= Texas Afghanistan Campaign Medal =

Military service award

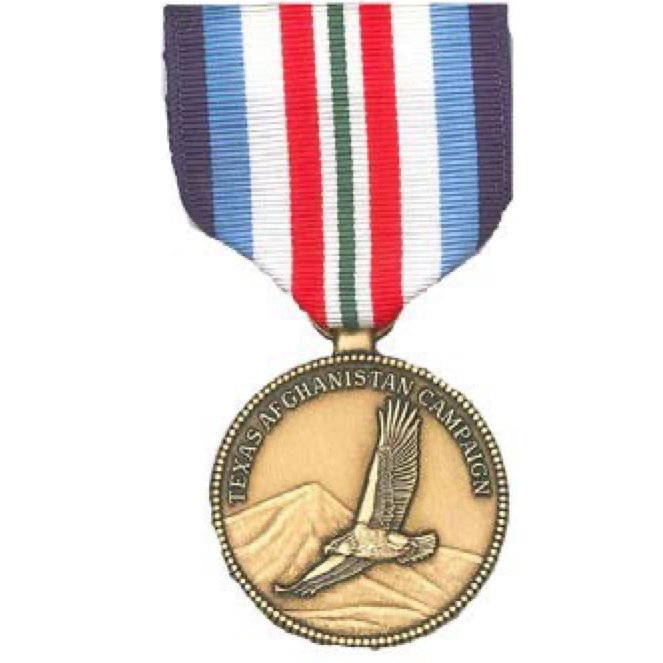
- Type: Military award
- Awarded for: Service
- Presented by: Texas Military Department
- Eligibility: Texas Military Forces
- Campaigns: Texas Military Conflicts
- Status: Retired
- Established: May 28, 2011
- Texas Afghanistan Campaign Medal service ribbon

Precedence
- Next (higher): Texas Federal Service Medal
- Next (lower): Texas Iraqi Campaign Medal

The Texas Afghanistan Campaign Medal was a campaign/service award of the Texas Military Department formerly issued to service members of the Texas Military Forces.

The Texas Afghanistan Campaign Medal was established by Senator Kirk Watson in Senate Bill 586, authorized by the Eighty-second Texas Legislature, and approved by Governor Rick Perry on May 28, 2011. Effective September 01, 2011. Texas Government Code, Chapter 437 (Texas Military), Subchapter H. (Awards), Section 355 (Other Awards), Line 14.

== See also ==
- Awards and decorations of the Texas Military
- List of conflicts involving the Texas Military
- Texas Military Forces
- Texas Military Department
- Awards and decorations of the Texas government
