= Coat of arms of Texas =

Coat of arms of the U.S. state of Texas

Coat of arms of the State of Texas
- Coat of Arms of the State of Texas
- Armiger: Texas
- Adopted: Republic of Texas: 1839; State of Texas: 1992
- Shield: The state arms are a five-pointed white star, on an azure background, encircled by olive and live oak branches.
- Use: Official state purposes

Related Usage

Versions
- Seal of Texas

- Texas Army National Guard Crest

Texas is one of eighteen states that have adopted an official coat of arms. The current coat of arms is the same as the original coat of arms used by the Republic of Texas before its annexation into the United States.

== Blazon ==
The state arms are a five-pointed white star, on an azure background, encircled by olive and live oak branches.

== History ==
With its independence from Mexico in 1836, the new Republic of Texas was in need of its own national emblems. A “lone” star had been a common symbol of the independence movement, featuring in various flags such as Captain Scott's Flag, the De Zavala Flag, the Harrisburg Volunteer's Flags and others. The Congress of the Republic adopted legislation on January 25, 1839, that established the official symbols of the republic, including the flag, which is still in use as the state flag of Texas, the great seal and the coat of arms, all of which featured a lone star.

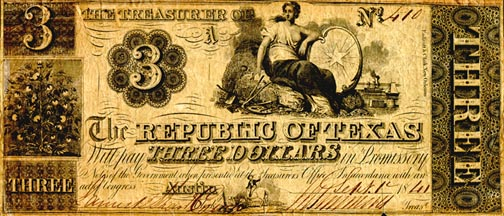
A $3 bill of the Republic of Texas featuring the shield and star of the national coat of arms.

The new coat of arms of the republic was described as “a white star of five points on an azure ground encircled by olive and live oak branches.” However, two elements of the arms can be considered as being open to interpretation. The “azure ground” has been variously interpreted as either a traditional heraldic shield or, more commonly, a circular background. The placement of the olive and live oak branches was not specified, either. Though commonly depicted as charges along with the star on the azure background, they could also be interpreted as belonging outside of the shield as supporting elements.

Coat of arms of the Republic of Texas, “azure ground”

Coat of arms of the Republic of Texas, traditional heraldic shield

Unstandardized version with post oak leaves instead of live oak leaves.

== Statehood ==
Upon joining the United States in 1845, the state of Texas retained its national flag and seal as emblems of the new state, but there were no provisions for a state coat of arms. The three main elements of the 1839 act, the five pointed white star and olive and live oak branches, remained the basic emblems of Texas as represented in the state seal. However, many different variations of the seal emerged over the years containing incorrect or superfluous items such as decorative stars and diamonds and the incorrect type of oak leaves. By 1991, nearly twenty different versions of the seal were being used on various state documents and letterhead. The Texas State Seal Advisory Committee was appointed to develop uniform standards for the state seal based upon a description as opposed to an art design. Recognizing the star, olive and live oak branches as the basic historic elements representing Texas, the official design of the Texas State Arms was approved as well, and adopted in June 1992. In essence, the coat of arms of the state of Texas is the same as the coat of arms of the Republic of Texas without the azure background.

== Use ==
- The Texas coat of arms is used exclusively as a symbol of the state and does not have any independent legal significance.
- The coat of arms of the Republic of Texas is featured in the architecture of the interior and exterior of the Texas State Capitol in Austin, Texas
- The coat of arms of Texas is featured on the Texas Purple Heart Medal, Texas Cavalry WWI Service Medal, Texas Desert Shield-Desert Storm Campaign Medal, Texas Faithful Service Medal, Texas Federal Service Medal, Texas Medal of Merit and Texas Outstanding Service Medal of the Texas Army National Guard.

== See also ==
- Coats of arms of the U.S. states
