= Texas Iraqi Campaign Medal =

Texan medal

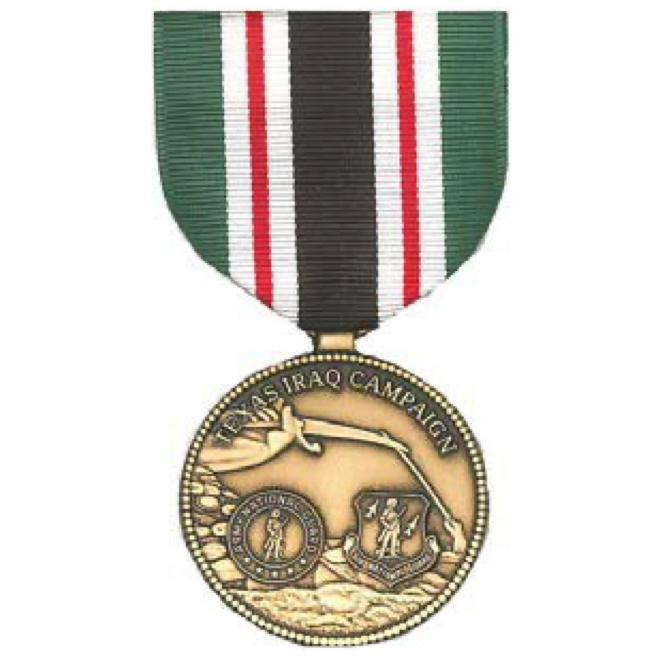
- Type: Military award
- Awarded for: Service
- Presented by: Texas Military Department
- Eligibility: Texas Military Forces
- Campaign(s): Texas Military Conflicts
- Status: Retired
- Established: May 28, 2011
- Texas Iraqi Campaign Medal medal ribbon

Precedence
- Next (higher): Texas Afghanistan Campaign Medal
- Next (lower): Texas Desert Shield-Desert Storm Campaign Medal

The Texas Iraqi Campaign Medal is a campaign/service award of the Texas Military Department issued to service members of the Texas Military Forces.

The Texas Iraqi Campaign Medal was established by Senator Kirk Watson in Senate Bill 356, authorized by the Eighty-second Texas Legislature, and approved by Governor Rick Perry on May 28, 2011. Effective September 01, 2011. Texas Government Code, Chapter 437 (Texas Military), Subchapter H. (Awards), Section 355 (Other Awards), Line 13.

== See also ==
- Awards and decorations of the Texas Military
- List of conflicts involving the Texas Military
- Texas Military Forces
- Texas Military Department
- Awards and decorations of the Texas government
