= Texas Desert Shield-Desert Storm Campaign Medal =

- Type: Military award
- Awarded for: Service
- Description: The ribbon drape is of blue, white, red, khaki and brown stripes. The medal is bronze with an outline of the State of Texas and scenes of aircraft and combat personnel with the words "Operation Desert Shield/Desert Storm Campaign Medal". On the reverse is the Coat of Arms of Texas with the words "Texas National Guard" and "For Service".
- Presented by: Texas Military Department
- Eligibility: Texas Military Forces
- Campaigns: Texas Military Conflicts
- Status: Retired
- Established: June 5, 1991
- Texas Desert Shield-Desert Storm Campaign Medal medal ribbon

Precedence
- Next (higher): Texas Iraqi Campaign Medal
- Next (lower): Texas Humanitarian Service Ribbon

The Texas Desert Shield-Desert Storm Campaign Medal was a campaign/service award of the Texas Military Department that was issued to service members of the Texas Military Forces. There were no provisions for subsequent awards.

== Eligibility ==
The Texas Desert Shield-Desert Storm Campaign Medal shall be issued to any service member of the Texas Military Forces who:

- Was mobilized into service under command of the United States Armed Forces (Title 10)
- From 1 August 27 1990 through 11 April 1991 in support of Operation Desert Shield and/or Operation Desert Storm
- Without regard to location the service member was deployed
- The Texas Desert Shield/Desert Storm Campaign Medal may be awarded posthumously.

== Authority ==
=== Issuing ===
No longer issued.

=== Legal ===
The Texas Desert Shield-Desert Storm Campaign Medal was established by Senator John N. Leedom in Senate Bill 573, authorized by the Seventy-second Texas Legislature, and approved by Governor Ann Richards on 5 June 1991, effective on 26 August 1991. Texas Government Code, Chapter 437 (Texas Military), Subchapter H. (Awards), Section 355 (Other Awards), Line 12.

== See also ==
- Awards and decorations of the Texas Military
- Awards and decorations of the Texas government
- Texas Military Forces
- Texas Military Department
- List of conflicts involving the Texas Military
