= Texas Federal Service Medal =

- Type: Military award
- Awarded for: Service under command of United States Armed Forces
- Description: The service ribbon drape is of yellow, red, blue and green stripes. The medal is bronze with the Alamo Mission in San Antonio and the words "Texas Service Medal" and "U.S. Armed Forces" on the obverse. On the reverse is the Coat of Arms of Texas with the words "Texas National Guard" and "For Service".
- Presented by: Texas Military Department
- Eligibility: Texas Military Forces
- Campaigns: Texas Military Conflicts
- Status: Currently issued
- Established: May 3, 1963
- Texas Federal Service Medal medal ribbon

Precedence
- Next (higher): Texas Recruiting Ribbon
- Next (lower): Texas Afghanistan Campaign Medal

The Texas Federal Service Medal, formerly the Texas Service Medal, is a campaign/service award of the Texas Military Department that may be issued to any service member of the Texas Army National Guard or the Texas Air National Guard. Subsequent awards are issued by a bronze or silver star device. It is not awarded to personnel of the Texas State Guard, although, qualifying Texas state guardsmen who have previously been awarded the medal may wear it on their dress uniform.

== Eligibility ==
The Federal Service Medal shall be issued to any service member of the Texas Military Forces who:

- Was mobilized into service under command of the United States Armed Forces (Title 10)
- From 15 June 1940 to 1 January 1946
- After 1 June 1950
- For more than 90 days

== Authority ==
=== Issuing ===
The Adjutant General of Texas and General officers.

== See also ==
- Awards and decorations of the Texas Military
- List of conflicts involving the Texas Military
- Texas Military Forces
- Texas Military Department
- Awards and decorations of the Texas government
