= Cold War Recognition Certificate =

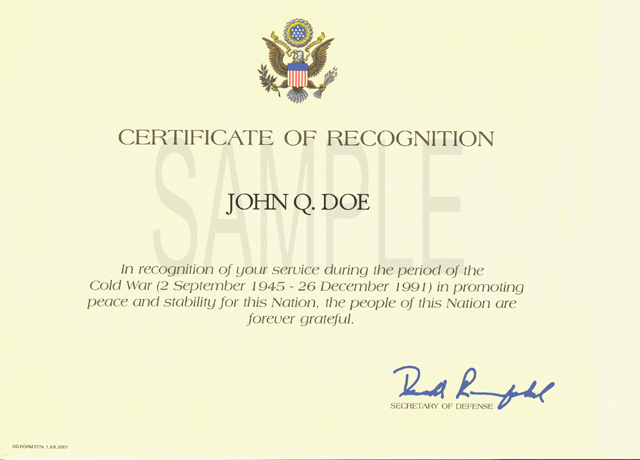
- Sample Cold War Recognition Certificate
- Type: Certificate
- Awarded for: "service during the period of the Cold War in promoting peace and stability"
- Country: United States
- Presented by: the Secretary of Defense
- Eligibility: Armed Forces and qualified Federal government civilian personnel only
- Status: Active
- Established: National Defense Authorization Act for Fiscal Year 1998, November 18, 1997
- Website: https://www.hrc.army.mil/content/Cold%20War%20Recognition%20Certificate%20Program%20Overview

The Cold War Recognition Certificate was authorized by the United States Congress in 1997 to recognize "all members of the Armed Forces and qualified Federal government civilian personnel who faithfully and honorably served the United States during the Cold War Era from September 2, 1945, to December 26, 1991". The Department of Defense designated the Department of the Army as the executive agent for the Cold War Recognition Certificate Program.

== See also ==
- Awards and decorations of the United States government
