= State of Maryland Meritorious Civilian Service Medal =

Civilian honor

The 'State of Maryland Meritorious Civilian Service Medal' is an honor bestowed on civilians - including civilian employees, family members and others - to recognize outstanding service to the Maryland Military Department, the Maryland National Guard or the State of Maryland. The honorary award was redesigned in 2008.
