= Armed Forces Service Medal =

Award of the United States military

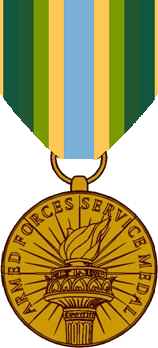
- Obverse
- Type: Military medal Service medal
- Awarded for: Participating in a designated U.S. military operation that did not encounter foreign armed opposition or imminent hostile action
- Presented by: the Department of Defense and Department of Homeland Security
- Eligibility: U.S. military personnel
- Reverse
- Status: Active
- Established: January 11, 1996
- First award: 1996 (retroactive to June 1, 1992)
- Service ribbon

Precedence
- Next (higher): Mexican Border Defense Medal (2025)
- Next (lower): Humanitarian Service Medal

The Armed Forces Service Medal (AFSM) is a military award of the United States military that was created on January 11, 1996, by President Bill Clinton under Executive Order 12985. The AFSM is a deployed service medal that is presented to those service members who engage in "significant activity" for which no other U.S. campaign or service medal is authorized.

== Appearance ==
The Armed Forces Service Medal is a round bronze medal 1 1/4 in (32 mm) in diameter. The obverse of the medal bears a demi-torch, as held by the Statue of Liberty, with rays radiating from behind the torch. Encircling at the top is the inscription ARMED FORCES SERVICE MEDAL. The reverse bears the eagle found on the United States Department of Defense seal. Below is a laurel wreath with the inscription IN PURSUIT OF DEMOCRACY at the top.

The suspension and ribbon of the medal are 1 3/8 in (35 mm) wide and consists of the following edge stripes from outside edge to the center: 1/16 in (1.6 mm) goldenlight, 1/8 in (3.2 mm) jungle green, 1/8 in (3.2 mm) green, 1/8 in (3.2 mm) mosstone green, and 1/8 in (3.2 mm) goldenlight. The center stripe is 1/4 in (6.4 mm) wide in bluebird.

== Criteria ==
The Armed Forces Service Medal is the non-combat parallel of the Armed Forces Expeditionary Medal which is normally awarded for combat operations and other combat support missions.

The AFSM may be awarded to service members who, on or after June 1, 1992:

- Participate, or have participated, as members of U.S. military units, in a designated U.S. military operation deemed to be a significant activity.
- Encounter no foreign armed opposition or imminent hostile action.

The term "significant activity" is determined by theater commanders and is normally deemed to be participation in a U.S. military operation considered to hold a high degree of scope, impact, and international significance that the operation warrants the presentation of a permanent service medal.

Service members must have been permanently assigned, attached, or detailed to a unit that deployed to participate in a designated U.S. operation within the area of eligibility for 30 consecutive days (or for the full period when an operation is less than 30 days) or for 60 non-consecutive days.

Aircrew members must have participated as a regular assigned crew member on an aircraft flying into, out of, within, or over the area of eligibility in direct support of the designated military operation for 30 consecutive days or 60 non-consecutive days. One day of service is credited for the first sortie flown on any day. Additional sorties flown on the same day receive no further credit.

The AFSM may be authorized for U.S. military operations for which no other U.S. campaign or service medal is appropriate such as:

- Peacekeeping operations
- Prolonged humanitarian operations
- U.S. military operations in direct support of the United Nations (UN) or the North Atlantic Treaty Organization (NATO), and for operations of assistance to friendly foreign nations. The award is only appropriate if the NATO, UN, or foreign operation involves a concurrent U.S. military support operation.

The AFSM is not authorized for participation in national or international exercises. For operations in which personnel of only one military department participate, the AFSM will be awarded only if there is no other suitable award available to the department.

Additional awards and devices

One award of the Armed Forces Service Medal is authorized for each designated military operation. Only one AFSM is awarded for multiple deployments for the same designated operation. Subsequent awards are denoted by wearing a bronze service star on the AFSM suspension and service ribbon. A silver service star is worn in lieu of five bronze service stars.

== Approved operations ==
Approved U.S. Military Operations for the Armed Forces Service Medal
Area or Operation	Start date	End date
Operation Maritime Monitor	1 June 1992	1 December 1992
Operation Provide Promise	2 June 1992	15 February 1996
Operation Deny Flight	12 April 1993	2 December 1995
Operation Sharp Guard	15 June 1993	20 September 1996
Task Force Able Sentry in support of United Nations Preventive Deployment Force	12 July 1993	31 March 1999
Operation Uphold Democracy	1 April 1995	31 January 2000
Operation Joint Endeavor	20 November 1995	19 December 1996
Operation Provide Comfort	1 December 1995	31 December 1996
Operation Joint Guard	20 December 1996	20 June 1998
Operation Joint Forge	21 June 1998	2 December 2004
Hurricane Katrina and Hurricane Rita relief efforts	27 August 2005	27 February 2006
Operation Jump Start	15 May 2006	15 July 2008
Operation Unified Response	14 January 2010	1 June 2010
Operation United Assistance	16 September 2014	30 June 2015
Operation Oaken Steel	12 July 2016	26 January 2017
DoD Support to Customs and Border Protection including Operation Faithful Patriot	7 April 2018	TBD
COVID-19 response	31 January 2020	1 June 2023
Capital Response I & II and the Presidential Inauguration	6 January 2021	23 May 2021
Operation Allies Refuge (OAR) & Allies Welcome (OAW)	31 August 2021	1 April 2022
Israeli Defense in 12-Day War (USS Arleigh Burke)	15 August 2024	16 December 2024
Operation Rising Lion (USS Arleigh Burke)	12 June 2025	24 June 2025

As an exception to Department of Defense policy, the Armed Forces Expeditionary Medal and the Armed Forces Service Medal may be awarded concurrently for Operations Joint Guard and Joint Endeavor. While Operation Sharp Guard was conducted during the Bosnia War, the Veterans of Foreign Wars refuses to accept Veterans of the Bosnian War who received the Armed Forces Service Medal.

== See also ==
- Humanitarian Service Medal
