= Texas Cavalry Medal =

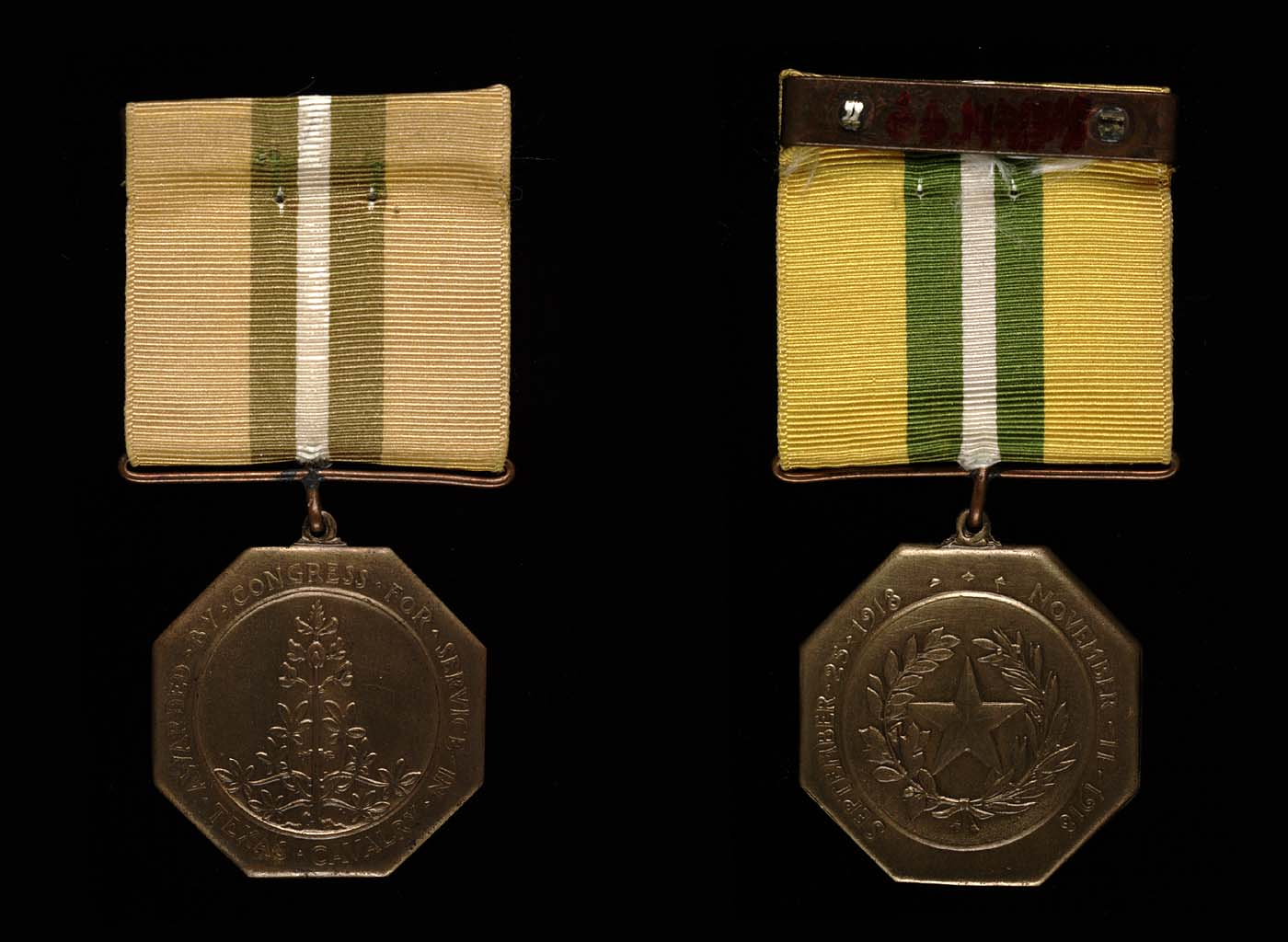
- Obverse and reverse
- Type: Military medal Service medal
- Awarded for: Texas cavalry raised and trained for service against Germany, but who did not qualify for the Victory Medal.
- Country: United States
- Presented by: Secretary of War
- Eligibility: Texas cavalry personnel only
- Status: Obsolete
- Established: April 16, 1924
- Total recipients: 840
- Service ribbon
- Related: World War I Victory Medal

The Texas Cavalry Medal was a United States service medal established by an Act of Congress on April 16, 1924. It was awarded for service in the Texas Cavalry between September 25, 1918 and November 11, 1918.

== Background ==
During World War I, Texas raised and trained two brigades of cavalry in anticipation of their mobilization in January 1919 and subsequent service on the battlefields of France. The end of the war on November 11, 1918 precluded the mobilization of the brigades and made their members ineligible for the Victory medal. In 1922, Texas's congressional delegation lobbied for approval of a medal to recognize the unique service of these troops. On April 16, 1924 Congress authorized the issuance of the Texas Cavalry Medal to those who served in the two cavalry brigades. The medal was designed by Mr. Anthony de Francisci and authorized by Public Law 91 of the 68th Congress and is a lasting testament to the patriotism and dedication to duty of Texas Cavalrymen during World War I.

== Design ==
The bronze octagonal medal is 1 1/8 inches (29 mm) in diameter. The obverse depicts the bluebonnet, the state flower of Texas. Inscribed around the edge are the words AWARDED BY CONGRESS FOR SERVICE; at the top of the medal and TEXAS CAVALRY; at the bottom of the medal. The reverse of the medal bears the arms of Texas, a Lone Star encircled by a wreath, surrounded by the dates of service in 1918 when the cavalry became eligible for federal activation and the signing of the armistice to end World War I.
