= Texas Purple Heart Medal =

- Type: Military decoration
- Awarded for: "Being wounded or killed in any action against an enemy of the United States or as a result of an act of any such enemy or opposing armed forces"
- Description: The ribbon drape is of purple and white stripes. The medal is gold in the shape of a heart surmounted by the Alamo Mission in San Antonio. Within the medal is a purple heart with a star of five points, encircled by olive and live oak branches, the Coat of Arms of Texas.
- Presented by: Texas Military Department
- Eligibility: Texas Military Forces
- Status: Currently issued
- Established: June 17, 2005
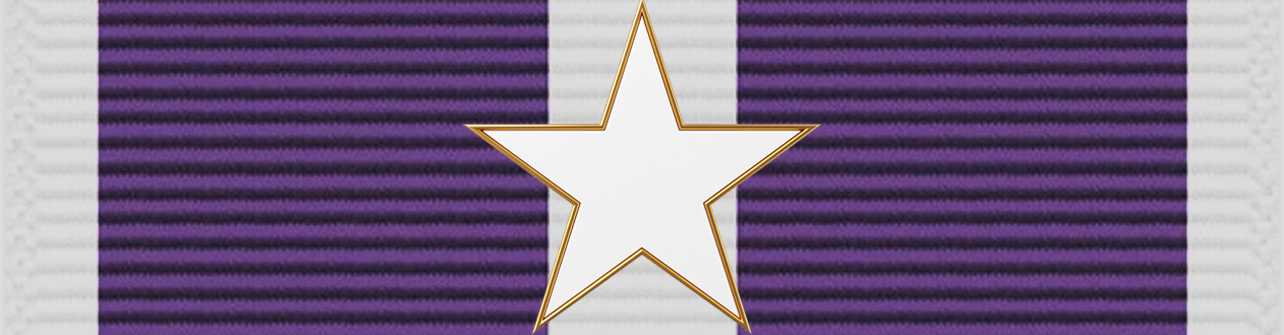
- Texas Purple Heart medal ribbon

Precedence
- Next (higher): Texas Medal of Valor
- Next (lower): Texas Superior Service Medal

The Texas Purple Heart Medal, commonly referred to as the Texas Purple Heart, is the third highest military decoration that can be conferred to a service member of the Texas Military Forces. Subsequent decorations are conferred by a white enameled five-pointed star trimmed in gold device.

== Eligibility ==
The Texas Purple Heart is conferred to any service member of the Texas Military Forces who was mobilized into service under command of the United States Armed Forces (Title 10) after 11 September 2001 and meets the criteria for decoration of the United States Purple Heart.

== Authority ==
=== Conferring ===
The Adjutant General of Texas.

=== Legal ===
The Texas Purple Heart Medal was established by Senator Kel Seliger in Senate Bill 955, authorized by the Seventy-ninth Texas Legislature, and approved by Governor Rick Perry on 17 June 2005, effective the same date.

== Description ==
=== Medal ===
The medal pendant has a heart-shaped design that is bordered by a gold edge, measuring 1 3/8 inches in width. It features a white star adorned with a green wreath in its center. Positioned above the heart-shaped shield is a front view of the Alamo. On the reverse side, a raised bronze heart is situated beneath the coat of arms and leaves, with the words "FOR MILITARY MERIT" inscribed below it. The medal pendant is suspended from a metal loop that is attached to a silk moiré ribbon measuring 1 3/8 inches in width. The ribbon consists of three stripes, starting with an 1/8 inch white stripe (67101), followed by a 1 1/8 inch purple stripe (67115), and ending with another 1/8 inch white stripe (67101). A large white enamelled five-pointed star, trimmed in gold, is mounted in the center of the ribbon with one point facing upward, measuring 3/8 of an inch in diameter.

=== Device ===
The recipient of a second or subsequent decoration will receive a white enameled five-pointed star, measuring 3/8 of an inch in diameter and trimmed in gold. These stars will be worn centered on the ribbon, with one point facing upward, alongside the star that was part of the original award. A maximum of four stars, including the star that comes with the original decoration, may be worn.

== Recipients ==
Date conferred	Service Member	Abbreviated Citation	Texas Military Unit	Command	Conflict	Ref
June 14, 2004	Sergeant Douglas Bennett	WIA	A Co. 1-124th Cavalry, 49th Armored Division	DOD	Operation Iraqi Freedom II	
June 14, 2004	Corporal Jeff Montgomery	WIA	A Co. 1-124th Cavalry, 49th Armored Division	DOD	Operation Iraqi Freedom II	
August 2005	Specialist Christopher Beck	WIA	C co 2BN 142Inf Reg. 56 Infantry Brigade Combat Team, 36th Infantry Division	DOD	Operation Iraqi Freedom III	
September 2015	Specialist James Burkett	WIA	A Troop, 1-112 Cavalry Squadron, 72nd Infantry Brigade Combat Team, 36th Infantry Division	DOD	Sinai insurgency	
September 2015	Private First Class Jose Romo	WIA	A Troop, 1-112 Cavalry Squadron, 72nd Infantry Brigade Combat Team, 36th Infantry Division	DOD	Sinai insurgency	
September 2015	Staff Sergeant Guadalupe Chapa	WIA	A Troop, 1-112 Cavalry Squadron, 72nd Infantry Brigade Combat Team, 36th Infantry Division	DOD	Sinai insurgency	
September 2015	Sergeant Michael Cantu	WIA	A Troop, 1-112 Cavalry Squadron, 72nd Infantry Brigade Combat Team, 36th Infantry Division	DOD	Sinai insurgency	
March 2016	Civilian Michael Grant Cahill	KIA			2009 Fort Hood shooting	
March 2016	Major Libardo Eduardo Caraveo	KIA			2009 Fort Hood shooting	
March 2016	Staff Sergeant Justin Michael DeCrow	KIA			2009 Fort Hood shooting	
March 2016	Captain John P. Gaffaney	KIA			2009 Fort Hood shooting	
March 2016	Specialist Frederick Greene	KIA			2009 Fort Hood shooting	
March 2016	Specialist Jason Dean Hunt	KIA			2009 Fort Hood shooting	
March 2016	Staff Sergeant Amy Sue Krueger	KIA			2009 Fort Hood shooting	
March 2016	Private First Class Aaron Thomas Nemelka	KIA			2009 Fort Hood shooting	
March 2016	Private First Class Michael S. Pearson	KIA			2009 Fort Hood shooting	
March 2016	Captain Russell Gilbert Seager	KIA			2009 Fort Hood shooting	
March 2016	Private First Class Francheska Velez	KIA			2009 Fort Hood shooting	
March 2016	Lieutenant Colonel Juanita L. Warman	KIA			2009 Fort Hood shooting	
March 2016	Private First Class Kham See Xiong	KIA			2009 Fort Hood shooting	
October 13, 2022	First Lieutenant Christopher Beck	WIA - mortar fire	Texas Army National Guard	DOD	Operation Iraqi Freedom II	

== See also ==
- Awards and decorations of the Texas Military
- Awards and decorations of the Texas government
- Texas Military Forces
- Texas Military Department
- List of conflicts involving the Texas Military
