= Texas Medal of Valor =

Lone Star Medal of Valor
- Type: Military decoration
- Awarded for: Valor
- Description: The neck ribbon is blue with a white star. The medal consists of a silver star below a bar with the word "Texas". In the center of the star, between olive and live oak branches is a circle with the word "Valor".
- Presented by: Texas Military Department
- Eligibility: Texas Military Forces and United States Armed Forces
- Status: Currently issued
- Established: May 3, 1963
- Lone Star Medal of Valor medal ribbon

Precedence
- Next (higher): Texas Medal of Honor
- Next (lower): Texas Purple Heart

The Texas Medal of Valor, officially the Lone Star Medal of Valor, is the second highest military decoration that can be conferred to a service member of the Texas Military Forces. It can also be conferred to service members of the United States Armed Forces or other state militaries. Subsequent decorations are conferred by a silver twig of four oak leaves with three acorns on the stem device. A lapel button is also conferred with this decoration.

== Recipients ==
Date conferred	Service Member	Abbreviated Citation	Texas Military Unit	Command	Conflict/Event	Ref
September 2004	Sergeant Tomás Garces	First service member killed in action since World War II	1836th Transportation Company	DOD	Operation Iraqi Freedom	
September 2007	19 Choctaw Code Talkers	Provided secure communication that aided victory	142nd Infantry Regiment	DOD	Meuse-Argonne Offensive	
May 2011	CSM Larry Rayburn	Rescued four paratroopers in subzero weather	143rd Infantry Regiment	DOD	Cold War training exercise	
July 2011	CW2 Howard Cook III	Sacrificed himself to save 1LT Rachel Ries during car accident	Not applicable to citation	N/A	Car accident	
2008	1LT Melissa Macintyre	Extraordinary acts of courage	149th Aviation Regiment	TMD	Water rescue	
2008	CW5 David Torres	Extraordinary acts of courage	149th Aviation Regiment	TMD	Water rescue	
2008	SFC Juan Rendon	Extraordinary acts of courage	149th Aviation Regiment	TMD	Water rescue	
2008	SSG Michael Faulk	Extraordinary acts of courage	149th Aviation Regiment	TMD	Water rescue	
2010	SSG Michael McNutt	Evacuated Bowie County Deputy Sheriff Michael Page; performed CPR for 25 miles	Not applicable to citation	N/A	Police shooting	
April 13, 2019	SSG Andrew Gleason	Risked life to save Texans	114th Aviation Regiment	TMD	Hurricane Harvey	
April 13, 2019	SSG Joseph Baker	Risked life to save Texans	114th Aviation Regiment	TMD	Hurricane Harvey	
April 13, 2019	SGT Marshall Hallmark	Risked life to save Texans	114th Aviation Regiment	TMD	Hurricane Harvey	
April 13, 2019	SGT Jason Carter	Risked life to save Texans	114th Aviation Regiment	TMD	Hurricane Harvey	
April 13, 2019	SGT Destry Riggs	Risked life to save Texans	114th Aviation Regiment	TMD	Hurricane Harvey	
April 13, 2019	CW4 Gerald Stayton	Risked life to save Texans	114th Aviation Regiment	TMD	Hurricane Harvey	
April 13, 2019	CW3 Justin Bielss	Risked life to save Texans	114th Aviation Regiment	TMD	Hurricane Harvey	
April 13, 2019	CW3 Ralph Hernandez	Risked life to save Texans	114th Aviation Regiment	TMD	Hurricane Harvey	
April 13, 2019	CW4 Robert Meischen	Risked life to save Texans	114th Aviation Regiment	TMD	Hurricane Harvey	
April 13, 2019	CW2 William Wallace	Risked life to save Texans	114th Aviation Regiment	TMD	Hurricane Harvey	
April 13, 2019	MAJ Adrian Velez	Risked life to save Texans	114th Aviation Regiment	TMD	Hurricane Harvey	
April 13, 2019	CPT Craig Tripp	Risked life to save Texans	114th Aviation Regiment	TMD	Hurricane Harvey	
April 13, 2019	CPT Jed Kennis	Risked life to save Texans	114th Aviation Regiment	TMD	Hurricane Harvey	
April 13, 2019	CW4 Brandon Briggs	Risked life to save Texans	114th Aviation Regiment	TMD	Hurricane Harvey	
April 13, 2019	CW3 Joshua A Schaaf	Risked life to save Texans	Nebraska Army National Guard	TMD	Hurricane Harvey	
April 13, 2019	1SG Ronald K Schroeder	Risked life to save Texans	Nebraska Army National Guard	TMD	Hurricane Harvey	
April 25, 2022	SGT Bishop E. Evans	Sacrificed life to save migrants	133rd Field Artillery Regiment	TMD	Operation Lone Star	

== See also ==
- Awards and decorations of the Texas Military
- Awards and decorations of the Texas government
- Texas Military Forces
- Texas Military Department
- List of conflicts involving the Texas Military
