= Texas Superior Service Medal =

- Type: Military decoration
- Awarded for: 30+ years of exceptional service
- Description: The neck ribbon is green with blue stripes near the outer edges, and three white stars. The medal is bronze in the shape of a star with the word "Joint" in a bar above it. Around the star are the words "Superior Service" and "Texas Military Forces."
- Presented by: Texas Military Department
- Eligibility: Texas Military Forces or civilians
- Status: Currently issued
- Established: June 15, 2007
- Texas Superior Service Medal medal ribbon

Precedence
- Next (higher): Texas Purple Heart Medal
- Next (lower): Texas Distinguished Service Medal

The Texas Superior Service Medal is the fourth highest military decoration that can be conferred to service members of the Texas Military Forces. It can also be conferred to civilians. No devices are authorized for this decoration.

== Eligibility ==
The Texas Superior Service Medal may be conferred to: (A) a service member of the Texas Military Forces who has: (i) completed 30 or more years of honorable service or a combination of Texas and United States Armed Forces service; and (ii) continually demonstrated superior performance and service while assigned to key leadership positions demanding responsibility; or (B) a civilian who has contributed significant service to the Texas Military Forces.

== Authority ==
=== Conferring ===
The Adjutant General of Texas.

=== Legal ===
The Texas Superior Service Medal was established by Representative Dan Flynn in House Bill Number 2896, authorized by the Eightieth Texas Legislature, and approved by Governor Rick Perry on 15 June 2007, effective the same date.

== Description ==
The medal pendant is made of gold-finished bronze and measures 2 inches in diameter. The front side of the pendant features a raised, five-pointed star that is 1 1/4 inches in size. In the center of the star is a banner with the raised letters "TEXAS MILITARY FORCES." The words "SUPERIOR" and "SERVICE" are written in raised letters on the upper left and upper right parts of the star respectively. On the reverse side of the medal pendant, the name of the recipient and the date are inscribed. The pendant is suspended from a silk moiré ribbon that is 1 3/8 inches wide and composed of hunter green with two azure blue pin stripes. The ribbon also features three white stars that are centered within it, symbolizing the three branches of the Texas Military Forces.

== Recipients ==
| Date conferred | Service Member | Citation | Ref |
|---|---|---|---|
| December 14, 2013 | Command Sergeant Major Michael Parton | For 48 years of combined service in the Texas Military Forces and United States Armed Forces | |
| October 29, 2017 | Lieutenant General Gerald R. Betty | For 41 years of combined service in the Texas Military Forces and United States Armed Forces | |
| January 28, 2018 | Major General Howard Palmer | For 38 years of combined service in the Texas Military Forces and United States Armed Forces | |
| May 23, 2019 | First Sergeant Keith D. Bickers | For 33 years of combined service in the Texas Military Forces and United States Armed Forces | |
| July 28, 2019 | Colonel Joseph Jelinski Jr. | For 48 years of combined service in the Texas Military Forces and United States Armed Forces | |
| August 1, 2019 | Major General Johann R. Kinsey | | |
| August 23, 2019 | Brigadier General Thomas C. Hamilton | | |
| July 26, 2022 | Brigadier General Marco Coppola | For exceptionally meritorious service for 37 years in the Texas Military Forces and United States Armed Forces. | |

== See also ==
- Awards and decorations of the Texas Military
- Awards and decorations of the Texas government
- Texas Military Forces
- Texas Military Department
- List of conflicts involving the Texas Military
