= Texas Outstanding Service Medal =

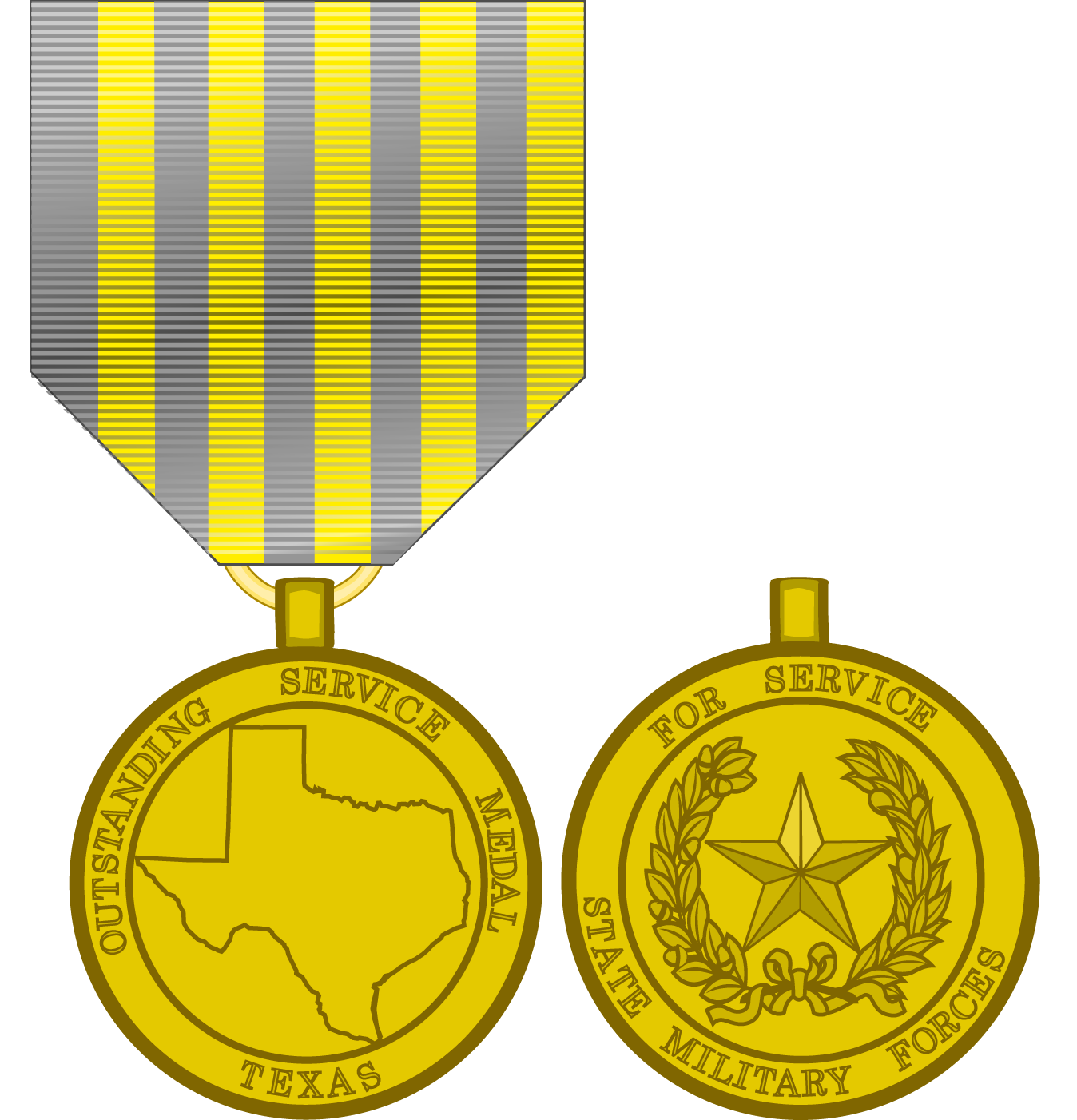
- Type: Military decoration
- Awarded for: Exceptional service or achievement
- Description: The ribbon drape is of five stripes of gray alternating with five stripes of yellow, beginning with a yellow stripe on the wearer's left. The medal is bronze with the outline map of the state of Texas with the words "Outstanding Service Medal Texas". On the reverse is the Coat of Arms of Texas and the words "For Service" and "State Military Forces".
- Presented by: Texas Military Department
- Eligibility: Texas Military Forces
- Status: Currently issued
- Established: May 13, 1971
- Texas Outstanding Service Medal medal ribbon

Precedence
- Next (higher): Texas Distinguished Service Medal
- Next (lower): Texas Medal of Merit

The Texas Outstanding Service Medal is the sixth highest military decoration that can be conferred to a service member of the Texas Military Forces. Subsequent decorations are denoted by a bronze or silver twig of four oak leaves with three acorns on the stem device.

== Eligibility ==
The Texas Outstanding Service Medal is conferred to any service member of the Texas Military Forces serving in any capacity, whose performance has been such as to merit recognition for service performed in a superior and clearly outstanding manner, but of a lesser degree than required for a higher decoration.

== Authority ==
The Texas Outstanding Service Medal was authorized by the Sixty-second Texas Legislature in House Bill number 30 and approved by Governor Preston Smith on 13 May 1971, effective the same date.

== Description ==
=== Medal ===
The medal pendant is of jeweler's bronze and is 1-1/4 of an inch in diameter. On the obverse side is a raised outline of a map of the State of Texas, encircled by the words "TEXAS OUTSTANDING SERVICE MEDAL" balanced with "OUTSTANDING" on the left "SERVICE" on the tip "MEDAL" on the right, and "TEXAS" on the bottom, in raised letters. On the reverse side of the pendant is a five-pointed raised star, 1/2 of an inch in diameter, one point up, surrounded by a wreath formed by an olive branch on the right and a live oak branch on the left, encircled by the words "STATE MILITARY FORCES" on the upper arc and "FOR SERVICE” on the lower arc, in raised letters. The pendant is suspended by a ring from a rayon moiré ribbon, 1-3/8 of an inch wide, composed of five stripes of gray alternating with five stripes of yellow, each of equal width, approximately 1/8 of an inch wide, beginning with a yellow stripe on the wearer's left.

=== Device ===
To denote second and succeeding decorations, a bronze twig of four oak leaves with three acorns on the stem is conferred. A silver oak leaf cluster is worn in lieu of five bronze oak leaf clusters.

Devices

== Notable Recipients ==
Date conferred	Service Member	Citation	Reference
	SGT Harvey Canaveral		

== See also ==
- Awards and decorations of the Texas Military
- Awards and decorations of the Texas government
- Texas Military Forces
- Texas Military Department
- List of conflicts involving the Texas Military
