= Lone Star Distinguished Service Medal =

- Type: Military decoration
- Awarded for: Exceptional service or achievement
- Description: The neck ribbon is red with a white star. The medal consists of a gold star below a blue bar with he word "Texas" in gold. In the center of the star, between olive and live oak branches is a blue circle with the word "Service" in gold.
- Presented by: Texas Military Department
- Eligibility: Texas Military Forces
- Status: Currently issued
- Established: May 8, 1967
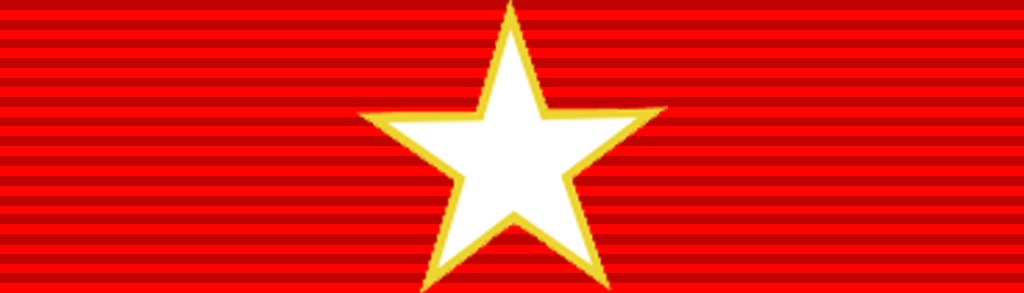
- Lone Star Distinguished Service Medal medal ribbon

Precedence
- Next (higher): Texas Superior Service Medal
- Next (lower): Texas Outstanding Service Medal

The Lone Star Distinguished Service Medal, also known as the Texas Distinguished Service Medal, is the fifth highest military decoration that can be conferred to a service member of the Texas Military Forces. Subsequent decorations are conferred by a white enameled five-pointed star trimmed in gold device.

== Eligibility ==
The Lone Star Distinguished Service Medal is conferred to any service member of the Texas Military Forces who, while serving in any capacity with the Texas Military Forces, shall have distinguished themselves by exceptionally outstanding achievement or service to the State of Texas in the performance of duties of great responsibility. The Adjutant General has final approval authority.

== Authority ==
The Lone Star Distinguished Service Medal was authorized by the Sixtieth Texas Legislature in House Bill Number 674 and approved by the Governor John Connally on 8 May 1967, effective the same date.

== Description ==
=== Medal ===
The medal pendant is a brushed gold five-pointed star with one point up, 1 1/2 of an inch in circumscribing diameter. In the raised center of the star is the inscription "SERVICE" on a royal blue field, encircled by a live oak branch with acorns on the wearer's right and an olive branch with olives on the wearer's left. The star is suspended by one link from a brushed gold bar, 1 3/8 of an inch long and 9/32 of an inch high, bearing the inscription "TEXAS" in raised brushed gold letters on a field of royal blue. The reverse of the medal pendant and bar is blank. The pendant is suspended by a metal loop attached to a burnt red moiré silk neckband 1 3/8 of an inch wide and 24 inches long, behind a hexagonal pad in the center made of matching ribbon. A white enamelled five pointed star, trimmed in gold and 3/8 of an inch in circumscribing diameter, is centred on the hexagonal pad, one point up.

Device

=== Device ===
A white enamelled five-pointed star, trimmed in gold, 3/8 of an inch in circumscribing diameter, is conferred for second and successive decorations. Stars will be worn centered on the ribbon, with one point up, in conjunction with the star that is part of the original decoration. A maximum of four stars, to include the star that is part of the original decoration, will be worn.

== Recipients ==
Date conferred	Service Member	Abbreviated Citation	Ref
December 11, 2022	Lieutenant Colonel Henry Burton	For 13 years of distinguished service to the TXSG and the State of Texas.	
	Colonel Harold Brent		
September 12, 1996	Command Sergeant Major Richard Nations	For 20 years of exceptional service in the Texas Military Forces	
September 28, 2002	Colonel Mervyn J. Doherty	Established Texas State Guard Officer Candidate School	
September 3, 2015	Colonel Brian Hammerness		
June 26, 2018	Colonel Ben Setliff	For 30 years of exceptional service.	
September 8, 2018	Colonel Steve Metze	For 29 years of combined exceptional service in the Texas Military Forces and United States Armed Forces	
June 24, 2015	Command Sergeant Major Maggie McCormick	Induction into the TXMF Hall of Honor	
	Master Sergeant Theresa M. Billeck-Zuniga	Induction into the TXMF Hall of Honor	
	Lieutenant General Gerald R. Betty		
July 10, 2017	Staff Sergeant Angel Avila	For exceptional meritorious conduct and outstanding service	[10]
July 28, 2019	Colonel John Wieden	For 24 years of exceptional service.	
July 31, 2021	Command Sergeant Major Charles R Turbeville	For 28.5 years of combined exceptional and distinguished service in the Texas State Guard (8.5 years) and United States Army (20 years. CSM Turbevilld served as the Texas State Guard Command Senior Enlisted Leader for MG Bodisch and MG Woods.)	
March 25, 2022	Colonel Joseph M. Ferguson	For over 24 years of distinguished service to the United States of America and the State of Texas.	[12]

== See also ==
- Awards and decorations of the Texas Military
- Awards and decorations of the Texas government
- Texas Military Forces
- Texas Military Department
- List of conflicts involving the Texas Military
