= Battle of La Ebonal =

Battle during the First Cortina War

Coordinates: 26.0873°N 97.9416°W

- Part of the First Cortina War
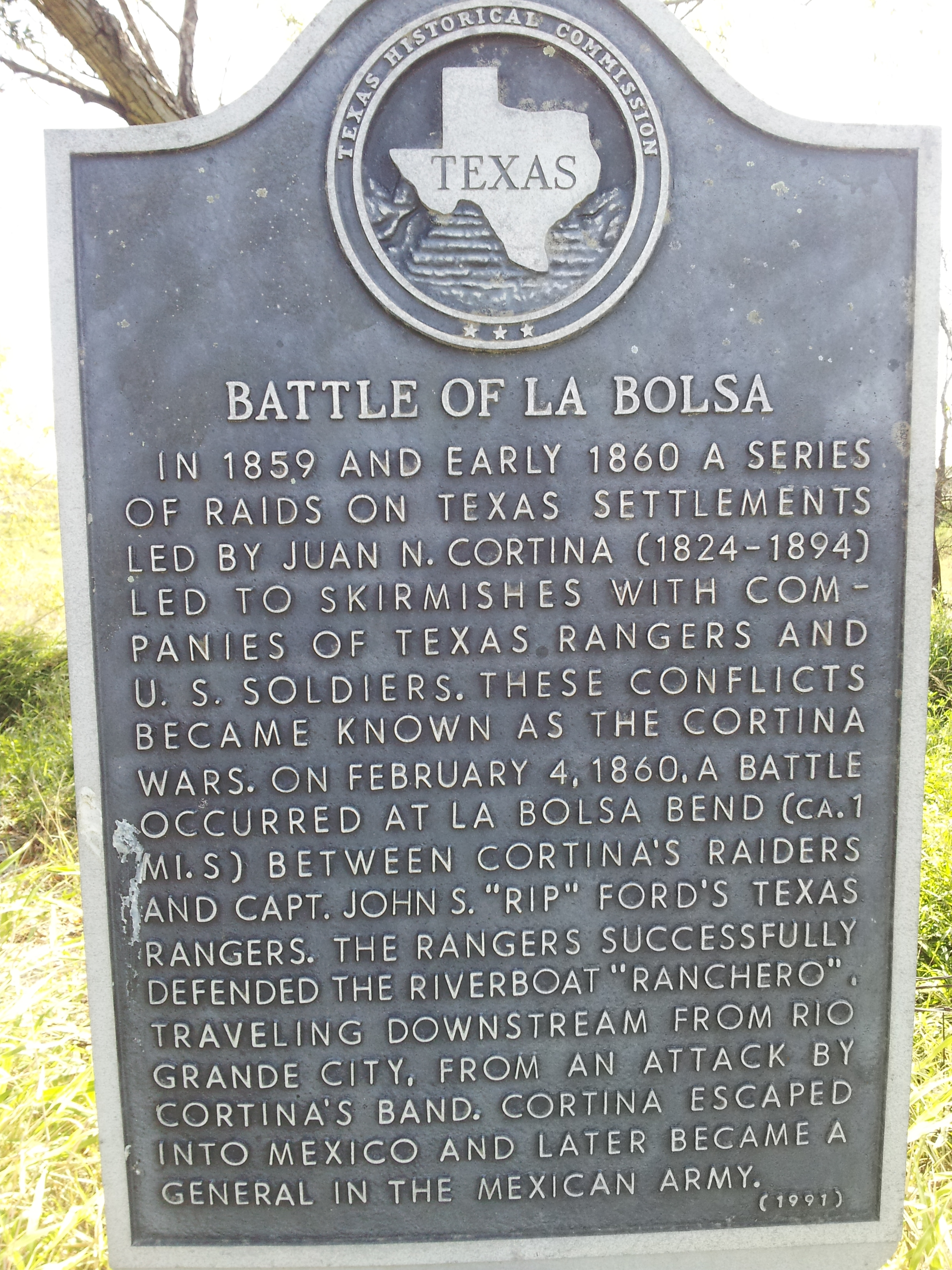
Date	December 13, 1859
Location	Near Brownsville, Texas, United States
Result	United States victory

Belligerents
United States	(Mexico) Mexican Paramilitary Forces: (Mexico) Cortinistas

Commanders and leaders
(United States) Samuel P. Heintzelman	Teodoro Zamora

Strength
290	~400

Casualties and losses
2 killed 5 wounded	~16 killed

The Battle of La Ebonal was fought in December 1859 near Brownsville, Texas during the First Cortina War. Following the Brownsville Raid, on September 28, and a few skirmishes with the Texas Rangers, rebel leader Juan Cortina led his small army into the hills outside of town and dug in near a series of cattle ranches. The United States Army responded by sending an expedition into the area, under the command of Major Samuel P. Heintzelman, with orders to pacify all resistance. A minor battle began on December 13, at a ranch called La Ebonal, and continued for a few hours as the Americans routed and then pursued the retreating Cortinistas.

== Background ==
The First Cortina War began on September 28, 1859 when Juan Cortina led about seventy-five men into Brownsville to punish the town marshal for past grievances. After killing between four and six people, releasing the prisoners from the town jail, and taking whatever arms and ammunition, the Cortinistas fled northwest to Rancho del Carmen, which was owned by Cortina's mother and used as his base for operations north of the river border. On October 12, the sheriff of Cameron County, James Browne, led a posse to the ranch and succeeded in arresting the sixty-year-old Tomas Cabrera, who was not only a close friend of Cortina but one of his chief lieutenants that had participated in the Brownsville raid. When Cortina found out what had happened to his friend, he issued an ultimatum to the people of Brownsville, threatening that he would "lay the town in ashes" if Cabrera was not released and if his enemies did not surrender to him. The situation quickly escalated from there. The citizens of Brownsville began constructing defenses, including a barricade to block the main road through town. They also formed a twenty-man militia, called the "Brownsville Tigers," which was sent to Rancho del Carmen and was hastily defeated by 300 rebels, who captured both of the Tigers' small artillery pieces. Cortina had his men build a forward base for his artillery outside of town and he formed a frontline close enough to Brownsville so that it could be seen by the Americans at the barricade. However, other than a shot from the cannon every morning at 6:00 am, there was no battle at the town itself. Over the next weeks, volunteers flocked to Cortina's camps from both sides of the border. Among his new recruits were some sixty Mexican criminals, who had broken out of the prison at Ciudad Victoria, and a band of Tampacaus native Americans from near Reynosa.

With Cortina's army growing stronger every day, the Americans sent for help and a force of Texas Rangers, under Captain William G. Tobin, was soon ordered to begin assembling in Brownsville. Cortina was well informed by his network of spies and sympathizers who lived in South Texas so he planned to ambush the rangers as they arrived in the area. On November 11, the morning after the arrival of the first rangers, Cortina was spotted coming down the road towards Brownsville, leading a body of an estimated 200 men. The American defenders quickly manned the barricades but Cortina decided not to attack and quietly withdrew back to base. The people of Brownsville panicked and, with the help of the rangers, an angry mob removed Cabrera from his cell and lynched him in Market Square. Cortina then hung three of his American prisoners before ambushing a small troop of rangers in the Palo Alto chaparral, near the Palo Alto Battlefield. In a fight that lasted less than one hour, three Americans were killed and four others were wounded. Their bodies were later found to have been "stripped and mutilated." In retaliation, Captain Tobin rode to the village of Santa Rita and burned it to the ground without any resistance. Later he moved up the river to attack Rancho del Carmen but again Cortina was victorious and the rangers were driven back to Brownsville by a "galling fire of round shot, grape and canister." Outgunned, about 100 Texas Rangers deserted and headed back north for home while those that remained waited for reinforcements.

At this point the United States Army became involved. On November 13, General David E. Twiggs ordered Major Samuel P. Heintzelman to lead an expedition of several hundred men to Brownsville. Though the major would be starting out from Old Camp Verde, in central Texas, many of the units placed under his command would be coming from distant states or territories, such as Kansas and Virginia. Because of this, Heinztelman issued orders for the majority of his men to rendezvous with him at Fort Merrill, on the Nueces River, and the remainder to assemble at Fort McIntosh, in Laredo, before beginning the final march to Brownsville. The major left Camp Verde on November 14 and arrived in Brownsville just before midnight on December 6, a journey of 332 miles. At that time, Heintzelman had with him two batteries from the 1st Artillery, under Lieutenants Douglas Ramsay and William Montrose Graham, Jr., a company from the 2nd Cavalry, under Captain George Stoneman, and two companies from the 8th Infantry, under Captains Arthur Tracy Lee and Charles Downer Jordan. Another battery of artillery, one company of cavalry, and a few more companies of infantry was still at Laredo. During all this time, Cortina's army grew to at least 400 men and a few artillery pieces but they were not well armed individually and had little or no military training. With information collected by Mayor Stephen Powers, District Judge Edmund J. Davis, and the filibuster José María Jesús Carbajal in Matamoros, Heintzelman concluded that Cortina probably had no more than 300 to 350 men, only 100 of whom were mounted. The Texas Rangers insisted that the number was at least 600.

== Battle ==
Immediately after arriving in Brownsville, Major Heintzelman reoccupied Fort Brown, rested his troops for a few days, and organized the rangers and the militia into one unit under his command. He also waited for some artillery pieces to arrive from the army stores in Brazos Santiago. On the morning of December 13, when he was ready, Heintzelman began marching 165 men west, up the Rio Grande road, to Rancho del Carmen. The weather was cold and slightly rainy. Two miles outside of town, the soldiers were joined by a force of 125 Texas Rangers. Heintzelman wanted to use the rangers for reconnaissance but they refused to move through the dense chaparral along the road in fear of being ambushed. As they approached Rancho del Carmen, the rangers again hesitated to continue further but Judge Davis, who accompanied the expedition, was able to convince some of them to keep moving. When the expedition reached Rancho del Carmen, they found that the "ten-foot thick mesquite (wood) parapets" had only recently been abandoned. The rangers then fanned out as they were supposed to by taking positions on the flanks in front of the column. After advancing down the river road two miles further, Heintzelman spotted one of Cortina's men waving a Mexican flag in the distance. Seconds later, the Cortinistas started the engagement by firing a "four pound ball" down the road from their positions at the nearby Rancho la Ebonal. Heintzelman had his artillery return the fire immediately but the American gunners were inexperienced, having never fired live ammunition before. At first, the American artillery went flying well over the Cortinista fortifications but after a spotter was deployed to the top of a mesquite tree the fire became more accurate. A gunnery duel continued for some time but casualties remained light on both sides. A piece of canister hit the pommel of Judge Davis' saddle and another piece wounded a man in the thigh. A third piece killed a mule before striking an ammunition wagon and setting it on fire.

After softening up the rebel positions, Heintzelman took the initiative by dismounting the rangers and sending them forward to attack one of the enemy's flanks while the infantry and cavalry attacked the other. In the meantime, the artillery would hold the road along the river, in the center of the battlefield. Neither of the movements made very much progress though. Not just because of incoming fire but because of how thick the prairie was. As the advance slowed, the Cortinistas launched an attack of their own, hoping to capture the American artillery. However, the Americans repulsed the attack with musketry and afterwards found eight dead rebels on the field. One Texas Ranger was killed during the engagement while two others were wounded. Two soldiers also received wounds. When the fighting ceased, Major Heintzelman ordered his men to regroup and rest for two hours before continuing further down the road. The rebels made another stand a short distance away from La Ebonal and yet another four miles up the road that leads to Edinburg and Rio Grande City, at the ranch of Jesus de Leon. During the latter engagement, both the rangers and the soldiers routed the Cortinistas, most of whom fled further up the river while others crossed over to Mexico. One more ranger was mortally wounded while a second was badly wounded in the shoulder due to an accidental discharge. Heintzelman reported that he counted eight more dead Mexicans as he rode up to the De Leon Ranch but overall casualties were difficult to determine because many of the rebels were literally "blown to pieces" by artillery fire. After another halt, the expedition continued on. At a fork in the road near Cortina's Rancho San Jose, fifteen miles from Brownsville, the Americans found a path leading through the chaparral where the rebels had dragged one of their cannons. The rain was starting to get heavier though so Heintzelmen decided to make camp for the night and follow the path on the next morning.

It was after 8:00 am by the time the march started again, mostly because the rangers took their time breaking camp. Not long after, the Americans heard the sound of Mexican bugles in the distance, sounding the retreat. Heintzelman ordered his men to make haste but no more Cortinistas were found. The major assumed correctly that he had successfully dispersed Cortina's army so he turned the column around and went back to Fort Brown, arriving later that evening. The Texas Rangers burned down several abandoned homes during the return march. According to Heintzelman; "The Texas Rangers were burning all - friends and foes.... We would undoubtedly have done better without the Rangers." Heintzelman later found that Cortina himself was not in charge of the rebels during the battle. He had gone north with 200 of his men, to conduct an ambush, and left his lieutenant, Teodoro Zamora, in command. However, when he heard the sound of cannon fire, Cortina rushed to the scene but apparently arrived too late to engage.

== Aftermath ==
After arriving back in Brownsville and the fort, Heintzelman allowed his men to celebrate the victory with a barrel of beer that was captured during the skirmish at Rancho de Leon. On the next morning, Heintzelman was "besieged by visitors congratulating him on his success." There were rumors, however, that Cortina was preparing to take up the offensive again by attacking Point Isabel and destroying the fleet of steamships there. Furthermore, the Texas Rangers were feuding over who they wanted to be led by. One half preferred Captain Tobin but the others preferred the recently arrived John Salmon Ford. Heintzelman preferred the latter, being that Salmon had discipline while Tobin let his men run wild. A war council later decided to send one company of rangers to Point Isabel, to protect the port, while the remaining rangers were sent north to scout Los Fresnos and Las Norias. Captain George Stoneman would also take a company of the 2nd Cavalry on a patrol up the Rio Grande. Meanwhile, Heintzelman was communicating with the Mexican authorities across the river in Matamoros. After speaking with the Mexican consul, Manuel Trevino, about Cortina and Mexican-American affairs in general, Heintzelman reviewed seven hundred Mexican Army troops before returning to Texas. At about the same time, a prominent local rancher, named Henry Clay Davis, entered Brownsville and told Heintzelman that Cortina was still retreating west, "burning and plundering as he went." This was further substantiated by Captain Stoneman and the Texas Rangers, who reported the same thing. For this, Heintzelman began preparing for a second march up the river. Leaving on December 21, the expedition headed west and eventually encountered the Cortinistas on December 27 in the Battle of Rio Grande City, the decisive engagement of the war. During the fighting, the rebels were surprised and routed from the city. They lost much of their arms and equipment, as well as about sixty men. The First Cortina War ended soon after.

== See also ==
- Garza Revolution
- Yaqui Uprising
- Bandit War
- Mexican Revolution
