= Battle of Carrizo =

1861 battle

- Part of the Second Cortina War
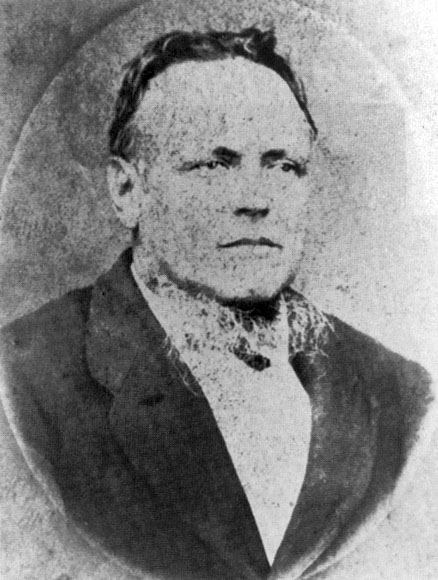
- Captain Santos Benavides
Date	May 22, 1861
Location	Zapata County, Texas, Confederate States
Result	Confederate victory

Belligerents
Cortinista militia	Confederate States of America

Commanders and leaders
Juan Cortina	(Confederate States of America) Captain Santos Benavides

Strength
30 Cortinistas	

The Battle of Carrizo was an 1861 battle, the only engagement of the Second Cortina War, and the final engagement of the wider Cortina Troubles. Juan Cortina, a Mexican rancher who had previously attacked American settlements in Texas' Rio Grande valley, sacked Carrizo, a settlement that was then the seat of Zapata County on May 22 with about thirty Cortinistas. In a forty-minute battle, Confederate Captain Santos Benavides decisively defeated Cortina, killing or capturing many of his soldiers and driving him back into Mexico.

== Background ==
The first Cortina War began in 1859 when Mexican rancher Juan Cortina and about 75 men raided Brownsville, Texas in response to the beating of a local Tejano named Thomas Cabrera. A series of battles followed, in which Cortina was eventually driven back to Mexico by John Rip Ford after his defeat at La Bolsa.

By 1861, Texas had seceded from the United States and joined the Confederate States of America. Although Zapata County officials reported a unanimous vote for secession, several prominent citizens remained Unionists at the time of the battle. A follower of Cortina, Antonio Ochoa, confronted county judge Isidro Vela in April with a group of armed men, intending to prevent the county officials from taking oaths to the Confederate States. After a confrontation, the insurgents were defeated.

== Battle ==
On May 22nd, Cortina and about thirty men entered Texas and attacked a ranch in Carrizo. Confederate troops under Captain Santos Benavides were dispatched from nearby Fort McIntosh to aid local forces. In a forty minute fight, Benavides decisively defeated Cortina, driving most of his forces back across the river into Mexico, killing or capturing several Cortinistas. About eleven prisoners from Cortina's force were either hanged or shot by the Confederate forces.

== Aftermath ==
After the battle, Cortina remained in Mexico and joined forces with Benito Juárez to defeat that year's French invasion, eventually being promoted to lieutenant colonel. In 1863, Cortina returned to the border to encourage the Union Army as it occupied Brownsville. As many as 300 of Cortina's forces were later present at the 1865 Battle of Palmito Ranch.

== See also ==
- List of wars involving the Confederate States of America
