= Juan Cortina =

Mexican ranchero, caudillo, and governor of Tamaulipas (1824–1894)

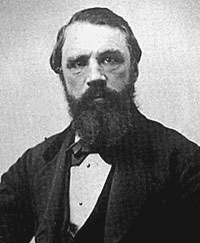

Governor of Tamaulipas
- In office December 1865 – 4 March 1866
- Preceded by: Francisco de León
- Succeeded by: José María Jesús Carvajal
- In office 1864–1864
- Preceded by: Manuel Ruiz
- Succeeded by: José María Jesús Carvajal

Personal details
- Born: 16 May 1824 Camargo, Tamaulipas, Mexico
- Died: 30 October 1894 (aged 70) Azcapotzalco, Mexico City, Mexico
- Spouse: María Dolores Tijerina (m. 1845)
- Nickname(s): Cheno Cortina; Robin Hood of the Rio Grande; Red Robber of the Rio Grande

Military service
- Allegiance: Mexico
- Branch/service: Mexican Army
- Rank: Brigade general
- Battles/wars: Mexican–American War; Battle of Palo Alto; Battle of Resaca de la Palma; First Cortina War; Brownsville Raid; Battle of Santa Rita; Battle of La Ebonal; Battle of Rio Grande City; Battle of La Bolsa; Second Cortina War; Battle of Carrizo; Second Franco-Mexican War; Battle of Puebla; Battle of Bagdad; Siege of Querétaro; American Civil War

Juan Nepomuceno Cortina Goseacochea (16 May 1824 – 30 October 1894), known as Cheno Cortina, was a Mexican ranchero, caudillo, military officer, and politician who effectively controlled the Mexican state of Tamaulipas and twice acted as its governor. In the lower Rio Grande borderlands he is remembered for leading the armed risings of 1859–1861 commonly called the Cortina Wars (Spanish: Guerras de Cortina).

Anglo-american newspapers and later Texas Ranger lore called him the "Red Robber of the Rio Grande." Tejano and Mexican popular memory more often treated him as a defender of people of Mexican origin after the Treaty of Guadalupe Hidalgo, and in contrast referred to him as the "Robin Hood of the Rio Grande." Modern scholarship treats him as a frontier caudillo who combined genuine grievances over land, law, and racial violence with personal honor, family interest, cattle raiding, and shifting wartime allegiances.

== Early life and family ==
A young Juan Cortina wearing the Mexican Army uniform.

Cortina was born in Camargo, Tamaulipas, on 16 May 1824, the son of José de la Trinidad Cortina, an attorney and former alcalde of Camargo, and María Estéfana Goseacochea de Cavazos. His mother belonged to the large land owing families of colonial Nuevo Santander. Through her, the household was tied to the Potrero del Espíritu Santo grant of roughly 261,000 acres issued to José Salvador de la Garza in the late eighteenth century; she later held an allotted portion of that grant on the north bank of the Rio Grande.

Trinidad Cortina died during the Mexican–American War and afterwards in 1848 Doña Estéfana moved the family from Camargo to her ranch, Rancho del Carmen, about nine miles upriver from the new town of Brownsville, Texas, where she built a house and chapel and established a ranching community. She died on 10 November 1867, and was buried at the ranch cemetery.

In Matamoros on 1 July 1845, Cortina married his cousin María Dolores Tijerina. The couple had several children. He spent his youth between Camargo, Matamoros, and the family ranches and was already a local military and ranching figure when the United States Army reached the Rio Grande in 1846.

== Mexican–American War ==
In 1846, at age twenty-two, Cortina was scouted by Pedro de Ampudia and joined Mexican forces under General Mariano Arista at Matamoros. Arista used him to raise irregular cavalry from local vaqueros. That force fought at the Battle of Palo Alto and the Battle of Resaca de la Palma. After the signing of the Treaty of Guadalupe Hidalgo the new international boundary split the old Nuevo Santander ranching world. A large part of the family’s Espíritu Santo lands now lay in Texas.

Cortina returned to the north bank, worked for a time for the U.S. Army quartermaster in the lower Valley, and entered Cameron County Democratic politics as a local boss among Mexican-Tejanos. A Cameron County grand jury indicted him at least twice for cattle theft. He was not arrested. Writers note that his standing among Mexican residents made local officers unwilling or unable to seize him.

== Land, law, and the lower Valley after 1848 ==
In the decade after the treaty, Mexican and Tejano landowners in the Lower Rio Grande Valley faced a new legal order. Texas courts, English-language procedure, tax sales, and a class of Brownsville lawyers and judges converted many Spanish and Mexican titles. Cortina accused a clique of attorneys and officials of stripping Mexicans “unfamiliar with the American legal system.” In his 1859 proclamations he called them “flocks of vampires, in the guise of men,” who robbed Mexicans “of their property, incarcerated, chased, murdered, and hunted them like wild beasts.”

Cortina’s own record was not only defensive. He remained a substantial ranchero, kept armed followers, and was repeatedly accused of cattle theft, the same charge later used in diplomatic pressure against him.

Doña Estéfana lost part of her Espíritu Santo allotment despite litigation that at points favored her; a Texas historical marker at her cemetery states that she “lost a portion of her land to robber barons, despite a court ruling in her favor.” Racial violence against Mexicans in Texas in this period is documented independently of Cortina’s career.

In 1858, Cortina joined other local rancheros in an attack on a remnant Karankawa band that had returned to the Texas side of the river near Rio Grande City after Mexican authorities in Tamaulipas accused them of raiding near Reynosa. Albert S. Gatschet, using testimony gathered for the Mexican Border Commission, wrote that Cortina and the other rancheros “surprised them at their hiding place in Texas, and were exterminated.” Contemporaries treated the coastal tribe as extinct after that raid. Later scholarship notes that Karankawa descendants survived elsewhere on the Gulf Coast.

== First Cortina War, 1859–1860 ==
=== Shears incident and the Brownsville raid ===
On 13 July 1859, in Brownsville, city marshal Robert Shears was beating Tomás Cabrera, an elderly Mexican man who had worked on the Cortina ranches. Cortina ordered Shears to stop. According to contemporary and later accounts, Shears answered with an insult along the lines of “What is it to you, you damned Mexican?” Cortina shot Shears in the shoulder and rode out with Cabrera.

On the morning of 28 September 1859, Cortina re-entered Brownsville with about forty to eighty men. His riders shot several people, including the jailer; five men were killed in the raid. They released Mexican they regarded as wrongly held and looked for specific Anglo enemies, many of whom hid or fled. Witnesses reported shouts of “¡Viva México!” and “Death to the Americans.” Cortina occupied the town until 30 September when influential residents of Matamoros crossed the river. After talks with José María Jesús Carbajal, Cortina agreed to evacuate the town and fell back to Rancho del Carmen. Brownsville men formed a posse known as the Brownsville Tigers, later joined by a Matamoros militia company. They attacked Cortina near Santa Rita and were routed, losing two cannons. Despite this the posse captured Cabrera; after Texas Rangers under William G. Tobin arrived in November, Cabrera was hanged.

=== Proclamations ===
Cortina issued two political proclamations from Rancho del Carmen. The first, dated 30 September 1859, addressed the inhabitants of Texas and of Brownsville:

There is no need of fear. Orderly people and honest citizens are inviolable to us in their persons and interests. Our object, as you have seen, has been to chastise the villainy of our enemies, which heretofore has gone unpunished. These have connived with each other, and form, so to speak, a perfidious inquisitorial lodge to persecute and rob us, without any cause, and for no other crime on our part than that of being of Mexican origin…

The second proclamation, dated 23 November 1859, addressed “the Mexican inhabitants of the State of Texas” and asked Governor Sam Houston to protect their legal interests. It included the sentence later most often quoted:

Mexicans! My part is taken; the voice of revelation whispers to me that to me is entrusted the work of breaking the chains of your slavery, and that the Lord will enable me, with powerful arm, to fight against our enemies…

Texas Ranger John Salmon Ford later wrote that, to the poor who heard him, Cortina was “a sign of hope in a land where hope heretofore had no meaning.” Brownsville editors printed the same texts as the work of an “arch murderer and robber.”

=== Campaign of December 1859 – early 1860 ===
In December, a second Ranger company under Ford and 165 U.S. regulars under Major Samuel P. Heintzelman moved upriver. Cortina’s force, reported at several hundred, laid waste to ranches in the lower Valley as it retreated. On 27 December 1859, Heintzelman defeated him at Rio Grande City; Cortina lost about sixty men and his equipment and crossed into Mexico.

He next appeared at La Bolsa, a bend of the Rio Grande, and tried to take the steamboat Ranchero. Ford’s Rangers crossed into Mexico, secured the south bank, and forced him back. Colonel Robert E. Lee, commanding the Eighth Military District, came to the lower Valley and threatened invasion of Mexico if the raids continued. Cortina withdrew into the Burgos Mountains of Tamaulipas and remained there more than a year.

== Second Franco-Mexican War and American Civil War ==
=== Second Cortina War and the Union, 1861–1863 ===
When Texas left the Union, Cortina sided with the Federal government against the Confederates who held the lower Valley. In May 1861 he crossed into Zapata County, Texas, and attacked Carrizo. Confederate captain Santos Benavides defeated him at the Battle of Carrizo; Cortina lost several men and withdrew into Mexico.

At the same time, the Mexican government of Benito Juárez was displaced by French and Imperialist troops. Juarez used Cortina as a frontier commander even while distrusting him. He fought alongside republican forces in the 1862 Battle of Puebla, after which he was promoted and sent back toward the border. In 1863 he was on the frontier as a lieutenant colonel. After Union troops under Major General Nathaniel P. Banks took Brownsville in November 1863, Cortina cheered the occupation from Matamoros and later received Banks there. Some of his men enlisted in the Union troops; Cortina also moved arms to the Union side.

=== Palmito Ranch, September 1864 ===
After the Union fell back from Brownsville to Brazos Island and Confederate forces under John Salmon Ford retook the town, Cortina closed cotton traffic with the Confederates and opened fire from the Mexican bank on rebel camps opposite Palmito Ranch. He planned to cross as many as 1,500 men of his brigade; on or about 8 September, as many as 300 men, with artillery, crossed the Rio Grande and fought alongside Colonel Hannibal Day against Confederates near Palmito Ranch. French diplomats protested a Mexican command on U.S. soil.

=== Matamoros and the Empire, September 1864 – April 1865 ===
Imperial forces then closed on Matamoros. On 26 September 1864 General Tomás Mejía entered the city; Cortina put on the uniform of the Second Mexican Empire. Contemporary Liberal and later republican accounts treated the surrender as a forced choice once Mejía was at the gates. The imperial interlude lasted until 1 April 1865. At San Fernando, on the Tamaulipas coast, Cortina once again declared his allegiance to Juárez and told the Liberal minister of war he was determined to resume his “natural character.” He cut the telegraph from Bagdad to Matamoros and moved several hundred cavalry and a company of infantry against the city in an attempt to recover artillery left there.

=== Return to Juárez, 1865–1870 ===
After April 1865 he again dealt with Union officers holding Brazos Island, fought imperial troops in Tamaulipas, and by mid-1866 rode into Matamoros as the imperial garrison left. At the end of the American Civil War he opened a recruiting office in Brownsville; some Cortinistas enlisted in the U.S. Army. In the summer of 1865 William Tecumseh Sherman, touring the frontier, met him in Brownsville, and U.S. materiel began moving to Juárez’s forces. He was present in the republican camp at Querétaro at the time of Emperor Maximilian’s execution in June 1867.

An elder Cortina c. 1870

In the vacuum of national authority he proclaimed himself governor of Tamaulipas more than once. Juárez ratified him as governor and military commander in early 1864. He held power again in late 1865 to 1866 before yielding to generals José María Jesús Carbajal and Santiago Tapia. Juárez ratified his rank of general de brigada in 1869 after the battle of Hacienda Lo de Ovejo, during an anti-Juárez revolt.

In late 1870 forty one Valley residents, including a former mayor of Brownsville, petitioned the Texas legislature to pardon Cortina for the 1859–61 fighting. One stated ground was the protection he had given Union men in 1864–65. The petition failed on second reading.

== Arrest, confinement, and death ==
In the 1870s Nueces Strip stockmen accused Cortina of running a large rustling network into Texas. American diplomatic pressure on Mexico City followed. In July 1875 he was arrested and taken to Mexico City. After Porfirio Díaz’s Plan of Tuxtepec succeeded in 1876, Cortina returned briefly to Tamaulipas and began to raise men again. Díaz had him rearrested. Motives include Cortina’s ambition in Tamaulipas, his unreliability, a payment from South Texas ranchers estimated in the tens or hundreds of thousands of dollars, and Washington’s wish to quiet the border as Díaz sought recognition.

He was held without trial at Santiago Tlatelolco until about 1890, then kept under house arrest in Azcapotzalco. He died there on 30 October 1894, aged seventy.

== In popular culture ==
- Documentary on 'History On Point' "Juan Cortina’s Raid of Brownsville, TX 1859: Part 1" https://historyonpoint.com/podcast/raid-of-brownsville-part-1-juan-cortina/
- Cortina is the subject of Oscar Chávez's song, "Corrido de Juan Cortina".
- Charles B. Griffith wrote a script to be directed by Roger Corman about Cortina called Devil on Horseback in 1955 - it was never made
- He was portrayed by Joaquim de Almeida in the 1999 film One Man's Hero
- In the Law & Order episode "Boy Gone Astray", Connie Rubirosa mentioned that Cortina was one of her ancestors.
- Jack Elam portrayed Cortina in the 1961 episode, "The General Without a Cause" on the syndicated television anthology series, Death Valley Days, hosted by Stanley Andrews.
- The 1996 documentary film, The West by Ken Burns, presents a section on Juan Cortina directed by Stephen Ives.
- In the novel Texas by Carmen Boullosa, the character Don Nepomuceno is based on Cortina.
- North and South, Episode 5 (1985) mentions him as a bandit being chased by American troops before the Civil War.
