= Brownsville Raid (1859) =

1859 military raid

- Part of Cortina Troubles
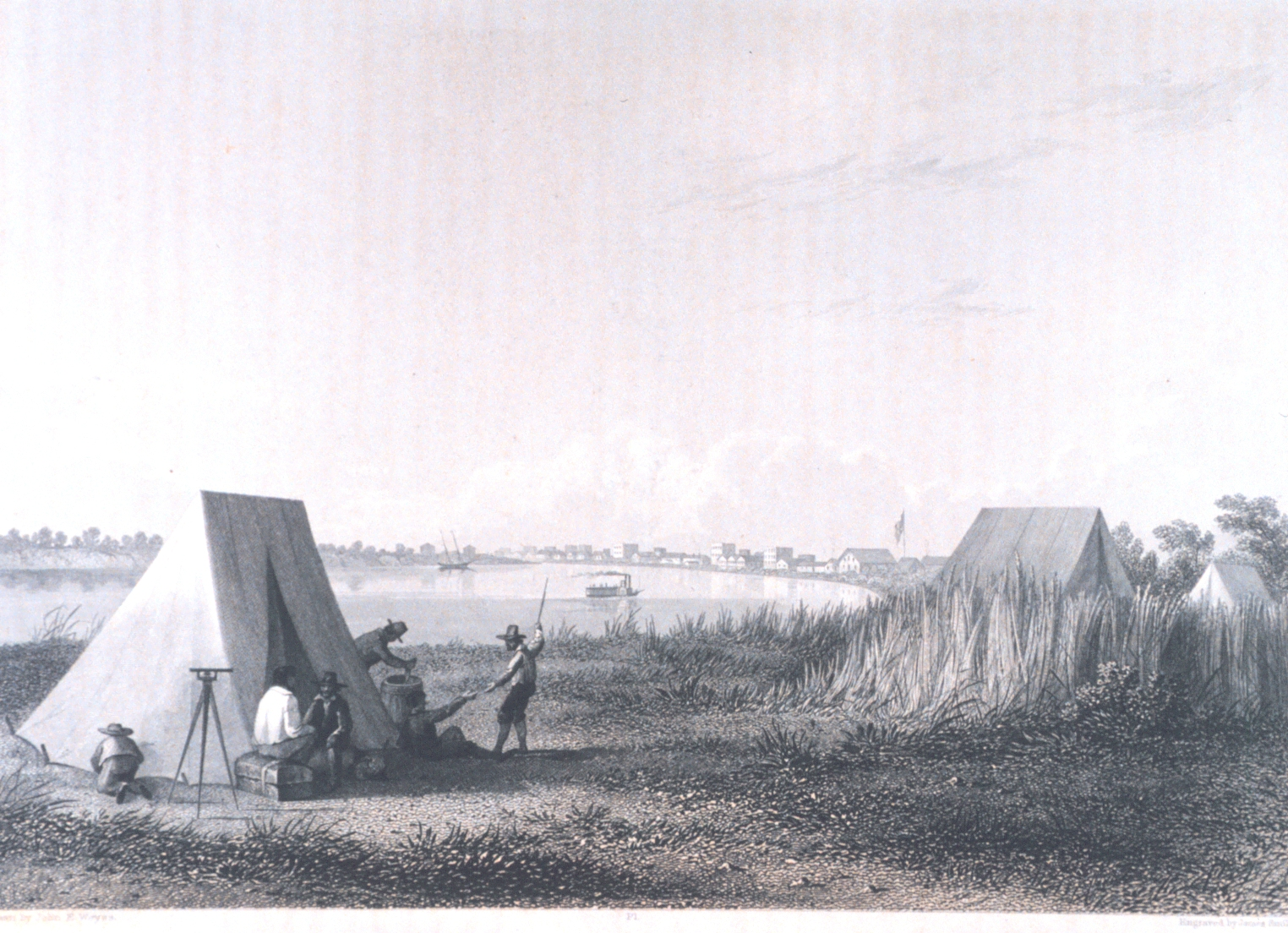
- Brownsville in 1857
Date	28 September 1859
Location	Brownsville, Texas
Result	Cortinista victory

Belligerents
(Mexico) Cortinistas	USA

Commanders and leaders
(Mexico) Juan Cortina	(United States) Robert Shears (WIA) (United States) Adolphus Glavecke (WIA) (United States) Robert Johnson (executed) (United States) George Morris † (United States) William Peter Neale † (United States) Viviano Garcia †

Strength
75 men on horseback	

Casualties and losses
None	5 killed

The Brownsville Raid was the opening act of the Cortina Troubles, a series of raids by Mexican rancher Juan Cortina into Texas. The raid was precipitated by Brownsville sheriff Robert Shears attacking a Mexican man named Thomas Cabrera and in turn being shot by Cortina. The incident was a culmination of growing discontent between Mexicans and Texan settlers.

On September 28, Cortina and a band of men attacked Brownsville with the intention of killing Shears and his associate Adolphus Glavecke.

== Prelude ==
Brownsville was first established on the banks of the Rio Grande in 1848, during the Mexican–American War. After the Treaty of Guadalupe Hidalgo, Tejano, or Hispanic Texan, ranchers in southern Texas came into conflict with Anglo-American settlers, who filed specious claims on property, forcing the landowners into the newly introduced American courts to assert their property rights. Mexican families would often have to hire an American lawyer, who would be paid with a chunk of land if he was successful.

On July 13, 1859, Mexican rancher Juan Cortina saw Brownsville sheriff Robert Shears pistol-whipping 59-year-old Tomas Cabrera, a former employee of Cortina's family, in the street. Cortina told the sheriff that he knew Cabrera and implored him to stop the beating, to which Shears responded by shouting "What is it to you, you damned Mexican?" In response, Cortina fired a warning shot, but when Shears continued whipping Cabrera, shot the sheriff in the shoulder. Cortina and Cabrera then fled Brownsville across the border to Matamoros, where he was hailed as a hero. To avoid an indictment, Cortina offered Shears cash for injuring him.

Cortina relocated permanently to Mexico and was commissioned as an officer in the Federal Army. In the months afterwards, Cortina raised a militia of around 100 Mexican men, popularly called the Cortinistas.

== Raid ==
Two hours before dawn on September 28, Cortina led a group of approximately 75 horsemen over the Rio Grande and into Brownsville, with the aim of rescuing Tejano prisoners and killing Shears, as well as rancher Adolphus Glavecke, who was infamous among the Tejanos for trading stolen cattle. The force, while shouting "death to the gringos!" and "Viva Mexico!", split into smaller bands to track down Shears and Glavecke. Cortina attempted to restrict looting and pillage among his men, although Texas Ranger John "Rip" Ford later accused the Cortinistas of having "killed whomever they wished, robbed whomever they pleased." At one point, Cortina arrived at the store of Alexander Werbiski and found his weeping Mexican wife at the door, telling her he would not harm her husband and that it was it was "no night for Mexican tears." He then bought arms and ammunition from Werbiski's store and left it untouched.

A main objective within Brownsville was the recently abandoned Fort Brown. Cortina's forces took over the fort but could not destroy it as planned because they could not batter down the magazine door. They were also not able to raise a Mexican flag at dawn due to a lack of rope. The Cortinistas freed several prisoners, killing jailer Robert Johnson, blacksmith George Morris, who had hidden beneath his house, and William Peter Neale, who was shot after bolting upright in bed when he heard the invading Cortinistas. The militia also killed one Tejano, Viviano Garcia, who attempted, without success, to defend Johnson. Shears and Glavecke escaped without harm when Cortina refrained from attacking the homes of those who had hidden them.

== Aftermath ==
At dawn, General José Carvajal, commanding the Mexican army in Matamoros, summoned Cortina and informed him that the Mexican government would not support his raid and would even prosecute him for it. Cortina, expressing regret over the killing of Garcia, left Brownsville for his mother's ranch.
