= Battle of La Bolsa =

1860 battle of the Cortina War

Coordinates: 26.0873°N 97.9418°W

- Part of the Cortina War
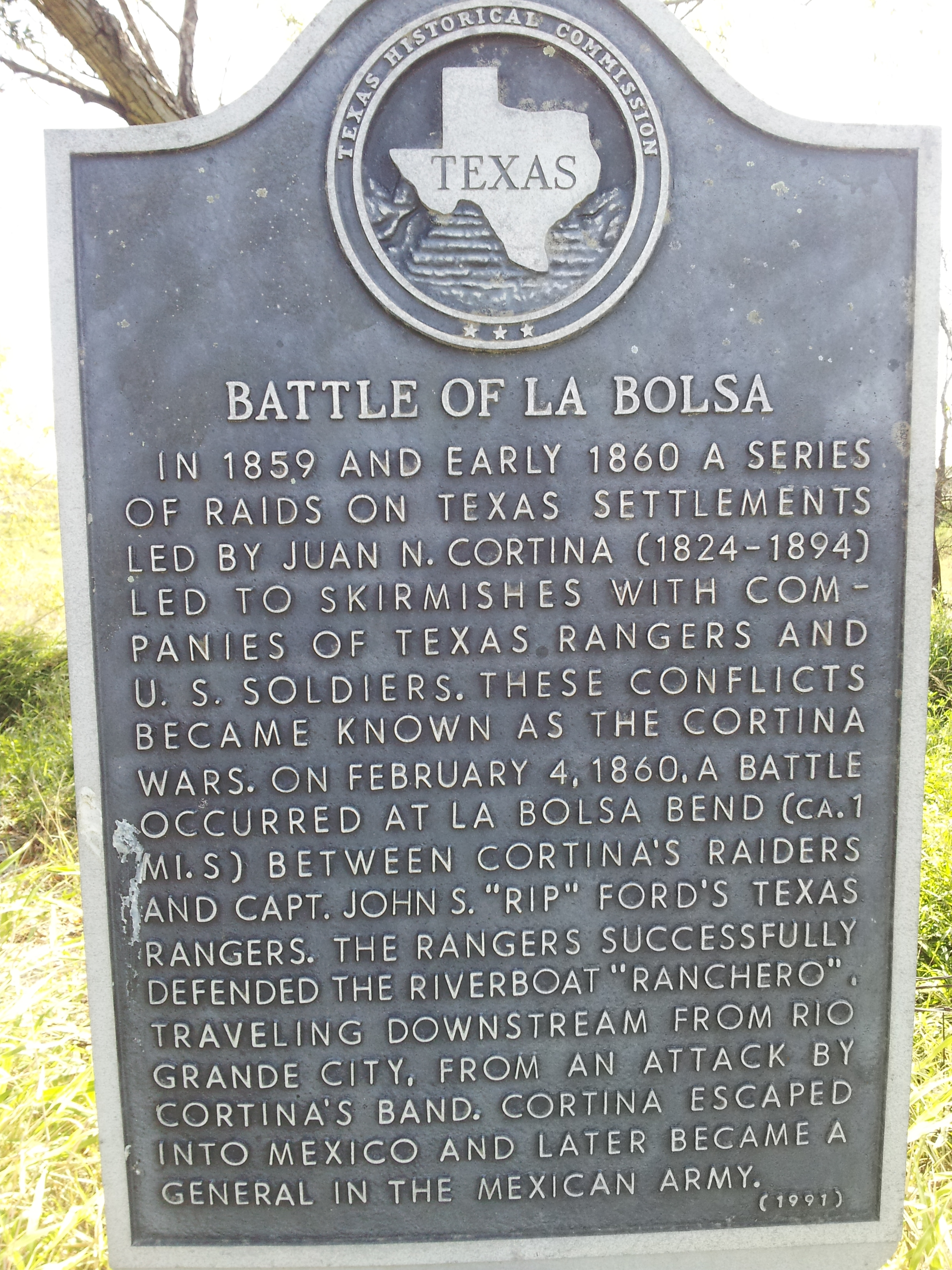
- A marker at the site of the battle
Date	February 4, 1860
Location	La Bolsa Bend, near Harlingen, Texas
Result	American victory

Belligerents
(Mexico) Cortinista militia	(United States) Texas Rangers

Commanders and leaders
(Mexico) Juan Cortina	(United States) Col. John Ford

Casualties and losses
29 dead 40 wounded	1 dead 4 wounded

The Battle of La Bolsa was a major event in the Cortina War, a series of armed confrontations between the militia of Mexican rancher Juan Cortina and elements of the United States Army and the Texas Rangers. The battle occurred on February 4, 1860, when Cortina's forces attacked the steamboat Ranchero on its way to Brownsville.

== Prelude ==
La Bolsa, meaning "the pocket," was a northward loop of the Rio Grande, on the border of Hidalgo and Cameron counties. On February 4, 1860, the steamboat Ranchero was on its way to Brownsville, Texas, with soldiers from Ringgold Barracks on board to guard the boat's cargo. Texas Rangers also provided security by riding along the river's north bank. More Rangers and a United States cavalry troop from Fort Brown approached from the east.

== Battle ==
As the Ranchero entered La Bolsa, Cortina's militia opened fire from the south bank. Those on board the Ranchero returned fire with their rifles and two cannons. Cortina prepared a second attack but retreated upon being charged by Rangers from Rio Grande City led by John Salmon Ford, who led the Rangers across the river.

== Aftermath ==
Although those on board the Ranchero suffered many casualties, the steamboat safely delivered her cargo to Fort Brown. As a result of the incident, the US Army sent Lt. General Robert E. Lee from San Antonio to threaten the Mexican Army with American intervention if they did not control Cortina's militias. Cortina retreated into the Mexican interior but later returned as an officer in the Union Army during the American Civil War to resume fighting with old rivals in the Rio Grande area.
