= Battle of Laredo =

Battle of the American Civil War

Coordinates: 27.5035°N 99.4954°W

- Part of the Trans-Mississippi Theater of the American Civil War
Date	18 March 1864
Location	Laredo, Texas
Result	Confederate victory

Belligerents
(Confederate States of America) CSA (Confederacy)	United States (Union)

Commanders and leaders
Santos Benavides	Alfred F. Holt

Units involved
33rd Texas Cavalry Regiment	1st Texas Cavalry Regiment

Strength
42	200

Casualties and losses
0	2 killed

The Battle of Laredo was fought during the American Civil War. Laredo, Texas was a main route to export cotton to Mexico on behalf of the Confederate States amid the Union blockade of ports along the Gulf of Mexico. On March 18, 1864, Major Alfred F. Holt led a Union force from Brownsville, Texas, to destroy 5,000 bales of cotton stacked at the San Agustín Plaza. Colonel Santos Benavides commanded 42 Confederate soldiers and repelled three Union attacks at Zacate Creek. Colonel Santos Benavides secured passage of the 5,000 cotton bales into Mexico.
