= Santos Benavides =

Mexican-American politician and Confederate army officer

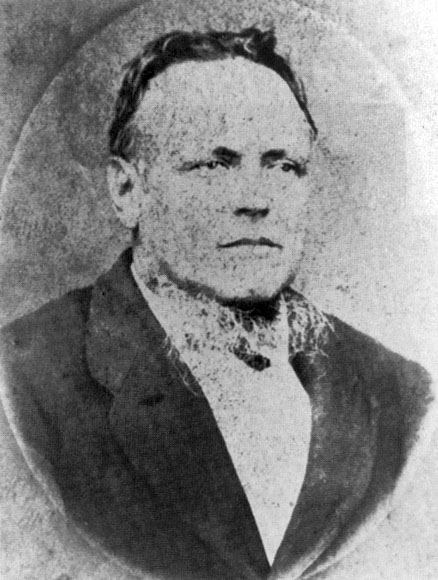
- Born: November 1, 1823; Laredo, Tamaulipas, Mexican Republic
- Died: January 9, 1891 (aged 67); Laredo, Texas, U.S.
- Burial place: Laredo, Texas
- Military career
- Allegiance: Confederate States of America
- Branch: Confederate States Army
- Service years: 1861–65 (CSA)
- Rank: Colonel (CSA)
- Commands: 33rd Texas Cavalry Regiment
- Conflicts: Second Cortina War; Battle of Carrizo; American Civil War; Battle of Laredo; Battle of Palmito Ranch
- Other work: Merchant, rancher

Santos Benavides (November 1, 1823 – November 9, 1891) was a Mexican-American Confederate colonel during the American Civil War. Benavides was the highest-ranking Tejano soldier in the Confederate military.

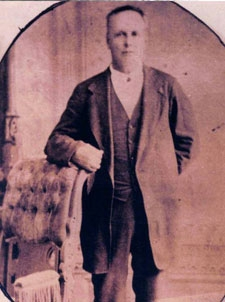
Copy of Santos Benavides photograph in the Republic of the Rio Grande Capitol Building Museum in Laredo

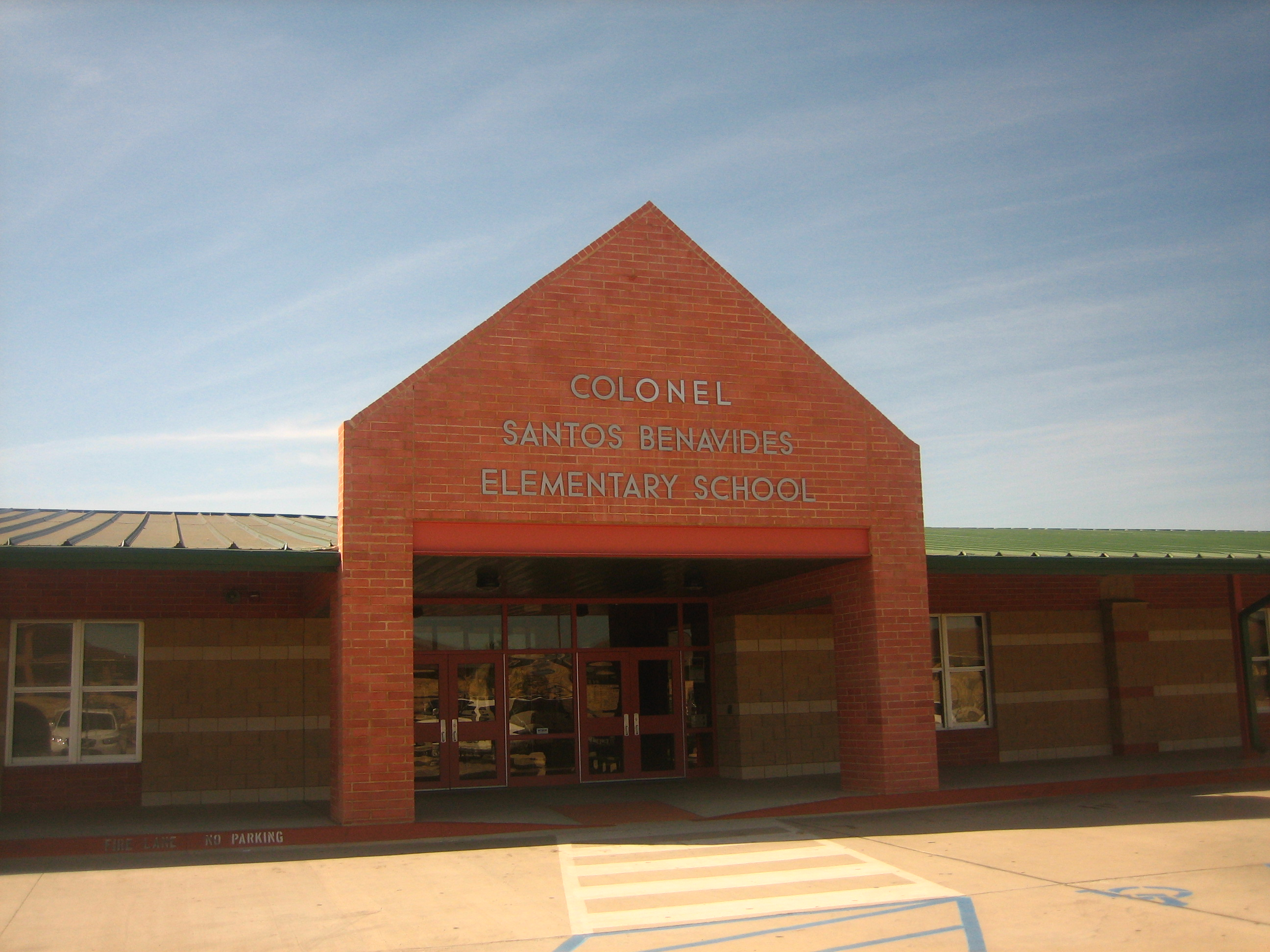
Entrance to Colonel Santos Benavides Elementary School in the Winfield subdivision of Laredo, Texas

== Biography ==
Benavides was born in Laredo, a descendant of Tomás Sánchez de la Barrera y Garza, the founder of Laredo, as well as the descendant of Captain Francisco Baez De Benavides, born in the Canary Islands and a Spanish early colonist of Northern Mexico. Benavides was elected Mayor of Laredo in 1856 and then became Webb County Judge in 1859. He was a Captain of the 33rd Texas Cavalry, also called Benavides's Regiment, until he was promoted to Colonel in November 1863.

Colonel Santos Benavides became the highest ranking Tejano officer in the Confederate Army. There are instances of him acting as a slave catcher, venturing into Mexico and retrieving runaway slaves and returning them to their masters, for which he was compensated.

On May 22, 1861, at the Battle of Carrizo (also called Battle of Zapata), Benavides engaged the local Tejano leader Juan Cortina (who had invaded Zapata County, an event usually referred as the Second Cortina War), and drove him back into Mexico. Probably his greatest contribution to the Confederacy was securing passage of Confederate cotton to Matamoros, Tamaulipas, Mexico, in 1863. Due to the Union blockade of ports along the Gulf of Mexico, shipping cotton to Mexico was one of the few ways the Confederacy was able to earn needed cash. On March 18, 1864, Major Alfred Holt led a force of about two hundred men of the Union First Texas Cavalry who were stationed near Brownsville, Texas under the command of Colonel Edmund J. Davis, who had earlier offered Benavides a Union generalship. Their mission was to destroy five thousand bales of cotton stacked at the San Agustín Plaza in Laredo. Colonel Benavides commanded 42 men and repelled three Union attacks at the Zacate Creek in what is known as the Battle of Laredo. Colonel Benavides secured passage of the 5,000 cotton bales into Mexico. In May 1865, Benavides's regiment participated in the last land battle of the Civil War, the Battle of Palmito Ranch.

After the war ended, he resumed his merchant and ranching activities and remained active in politics. He served three terms in the Texas State Legislature from 1879 to 1885. He died in Laredo and is buried there.

== See also ==
- Hispanics in the American Civil War
