= Cortina Troubles =

Military conflict

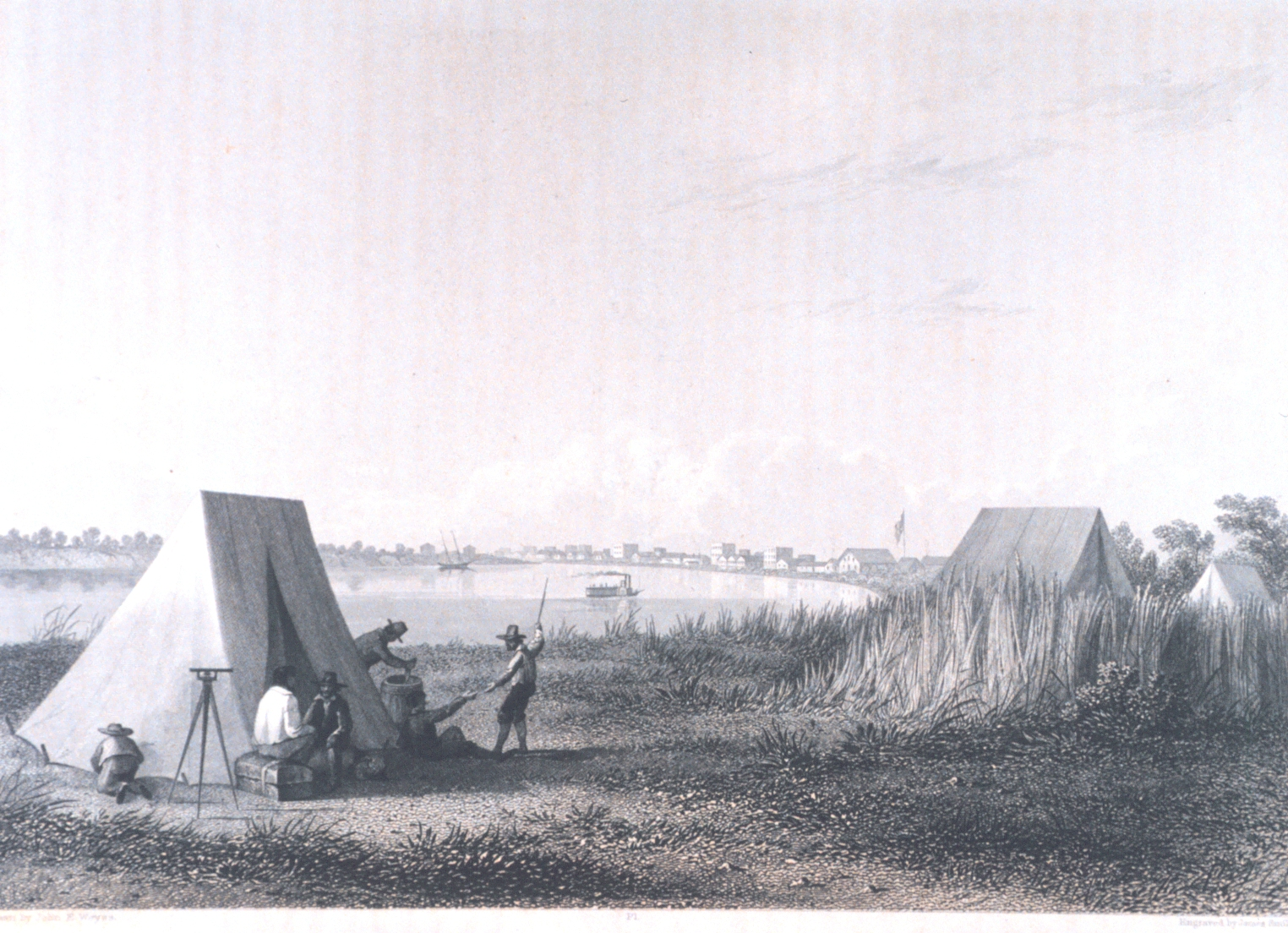
Date	First Cortina War: July 13, 1859 – March 17, 1860 (9 months and 4 days); Second Cortina War: May 21, 1861 – May 22, 1861 (1 day)
Location	Texas, United States; Tamaulipas, Mexico
Result	American–Allied victory

Belligerents
United States (Confederate States of America) Confederate States Mexico	(Mexico) Cortinista militia

Commanders and leaders
(United States) Maj. Samuel Heintzelman (WIA) (United States) Cap. Stoneman (United States) Marshal Robert Shears (WIA) (United States) Cap. Tobin (Confederate States of America) Col. John Ford (Confederate States of America) Col. Santos Benavides	(Mexico) Juan Cortina

Strength
United States Army; Confederate States Army; Texas Rangers; Brownsville Tigers; Matamoros militia	Unknown precisely

Casualties and losses
31 killed and wounded	216 killed

The Cortina Troubles is the generic name for the First Cortina War, from 1859 to 1860, and the Second Cortina War, in 1861, in which paramilitary forces led by the Mexican rancher and local leader Juan Cortina, confronted elements of the United States Army, the Confederate States Army, the Texas Rangers, and the local militias of Brownsville, Texas, and Matamoros, Tamaulipas.

According to author Robert Elman, Juan Cortina and his followers were the first "socially motivated border bandits," similar to the Garzistas and the Villistas of later generations. The fighting took place in the Rio Grande Valley area, which straddles the international border of Texas and Mexico.

== Trouble ==
=== First Cortina War ===
The First Cortina War began at Brownsville on July 13, 1859, when Cortina shot the town marshal, Robert Shears, in the arm for his brutalizing of Cortina's former employee, Tomás Cabrera. Tension increased between Cortina and the Brownsville authorities, and on September 28, he raided and occupied the town with a posse of between forty and eighty men. His enemies, however, had fled. During the occupation of Brownsville, Cortina issued a proclamation to reveal his intentions to both communities, quoting from Proverbs 22:24:

"(...) There is no need of fear. Orderly people and honest citizens are inviolable to us in their persons and interests. Our object, as you have seen, has been to chastise the villainy of our enemies, which heretofore has gone unpunished. These have connived with each other, and form, so to speak, a perfidious inquisitorial lodge to persecute and rob us, without any cause, and for no other crime on our part than that of being of Mexican origin, considering us, doubtless, destitute of those gifts which they themselves do not possess. (...) Mexicans! Peace be with you! Good inhabitants of the State of Texas, look on them as brothers, and keep in mind that which the Holy Spirit saith: "Thou shalt not be the friend of the passionate man; nor join thyself to the madman, lest thou learn his mode of work and scandalize thy soul."

Cortina retained control over Brownsville until September 30, 1859, when he evacuated the town at the urging of influential residents of Matamoros. In the following days, the townsfolk of Brownsville formed a twenty-man group to fight Cortina called the "Brownsville Tigers". In November, the Brownsville Tigers learned that Cortina was at his mother's home, called Rancho del Carmen, five miles west of Brownsville. They immediately launched an attack, only to be sent into retreat in disarray by the "Cortinistas", as they were called.

Later the same month, the Brownsville Tigers were joined by a group of Texas Rangers, and Cortina decided to attack them. The offensive was unsuccessful. In December, a second group of rangers led by Captain John "Rip" Ford arrived, larger and better organized. Because of appeals from Brownsville residents, the United States Army sent troops from San Antonio to the nearby Fort Brown, which had been abandoned a few years ago. The fort's new commander, Major Samuel Heintzelman, united and coordinated all armed groups to put an end to the Cortina threat.

Cortina retreated up the Rio Grande until on December 27, 1859, Heintzelman and Ford engaged him in the Battle of Rio Grande City. Cortina's forces were decisively defeated, losing sixty men and all their equipment. Pursued and defeated again by Ford a few days later, Cortina retreated with his men into the Burgos Mountains. The First Cortina War was mostly finished. With increasing pressure from the United States and Mexican Governments to cease all hostile activities, Cortina remained away from the scene for more than a year. The final engagements of the war were the Battle of La Bolsa, on February 4, 1860, and the Battle of La Mesa, on March 17. The Texas Rangers, under Ford, successfully defended their riverboat in the first engagement and routed the Cortinistas across the river at La Mesa, Tamaulipas.

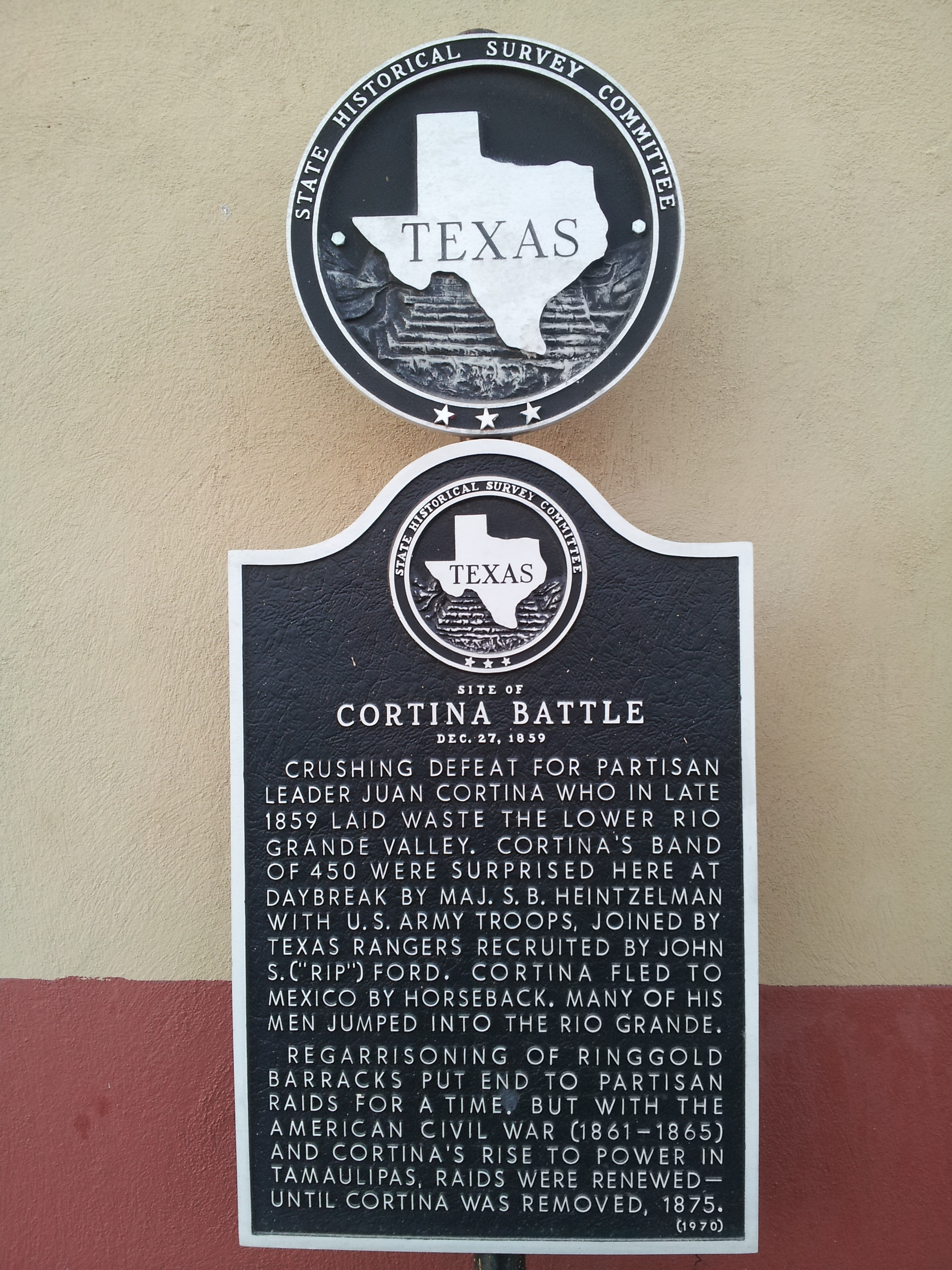
Texas Historical Marker in Rio Grande City

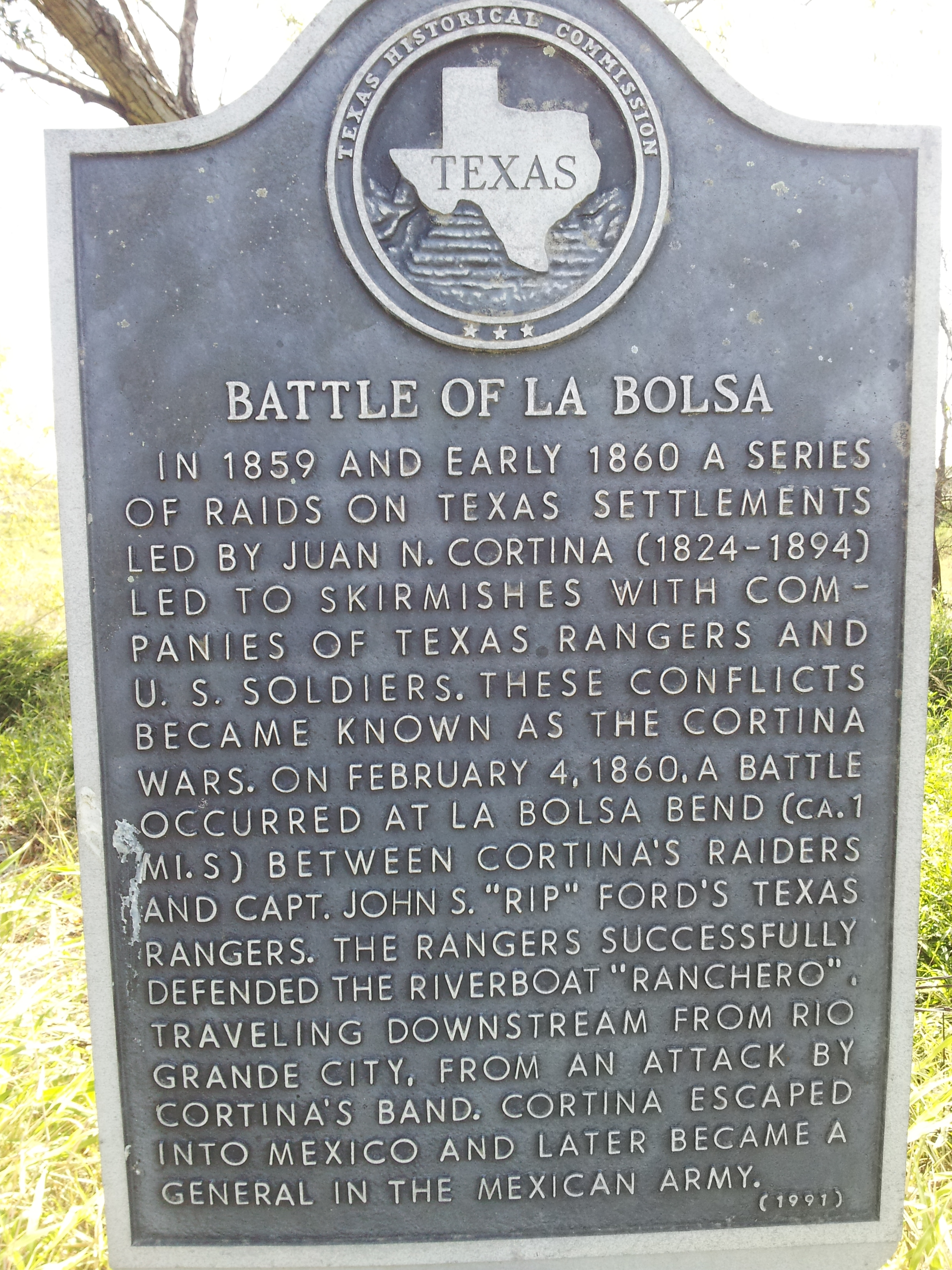
Texas historical marker on Highway 281 along the Rio Grande at the Hidalgo-Cameron county line.

=== Second Cortina War ===
In May 1861, the much shorter Second Cortina War occurred. The American Civil War had just begun, and Cortina, who had aligned himself with the Federal government of the United States, invaded Zapata County, Texas. Defeated by Confederate Captain Santos Benavides at the Battle of Carrizo and losing 18 men, Cortina retreated into Mexico. Cortina no longer conducted any large-scale military incursions within the United States. However, he was accused several times of promoting guerrilla actions against the richer Texan landowners in the area throughout the following years.

== Chronology ==
- The First Cortina War began on July 13, 1859, when Brownsville town marshal Robert Shears was shot in the arm by Juan Nepomuceno Cortina for brutalizing his former ranch hand, Tomás Cabrera (who was said to be drunk and causing a scene in Gabriel Catchell's coffee shop), and after ignoring Cortina's request to let him handle the situation. Cortina became one of the most important historical figures of the area and continued to exert a decisive influence in the local events until his arrest in 1875.
- On September 28, 1859, Juan Cortina raided and seized control of Brownsville with a forty to eighty-man posse with the intent of killing his enemies in Brownsville. His enemies went into hiding, and Cortina and his men shot five of the town's people presumably involved in the legal abuses against Texans of Mexican ethnicity. No indiscriminate attacks on the rest of the Brownsville population or their properties took place under the orders of Cortina. Cortina issues a famous proclamation, attempting to calm the American population of Brownsville and asking for respect towards the Mexican inhabitants' persons and properties.
- On September 30, 1859, Cortina evacuates Brownsville at the urging of José María Jesús Carbajal, Colonel Miguel Tijerina, Colonel Macedonio Capistran, Don Agapito Longoria, and Don Manuel Treviño, from Matamoros. The following days, Brownsville forms a twenty-man group to fight Cortina, calling themselves the "Brownsville Tigers". The Mexican authorities, fearing reprisals from the United States Government, instruct the Matamoros militia to join them. The group, led by Adolphus Glaevecke, capture Tomás Cabrera.
- In November 1859, the Brownsville Tigers learn that Cortina is at his mother's ranch near Santa Rita, Texas, now a ghost town, five miles west of Brownsville; the Tigers attack only to be sent into retreat in disarray by Cortina's forces.
- Later in the same month, the Brownsville Tigers were joined by a group of Texas Rangers. Cortina demanded the release of Cabrera by threatening to burn Brownsville. The Tigers hung Cabrera in the early part of that month, and the very next day, the Cortinistas launched an unsuccessful attack.
- On November 23, 1859, Cortina issued a second proclamation asking Texas Governor Sam Houston to defend the legal interests of Mexican residents in Texas.
- In December 1859, the second group of Texas Rangers led by Captain John "Rip" Ford and a regiment of the United States Army commanded by Major Samuel Heintzelman joined the Brownsville Tigers. Cortina retreats up the Rio Grande.
- On December 27, 1859, Heintzelman and Ford engaged Cortina in the Battle of Rio Grande City. Cortina was decisively defeated, losing sixty men and his equipment.
- On February 4, 1860, Captain John "Rip" Ford and a group of rangers successfully defended their riverboat against Cortina's men in the Battle of La Bolsa.
- On March 17, 1860, Captain John "Rip" Ford defeated the Cortinistas at La Mesa, Tamaulipas. The First Cortina War finishes.
- The Second Cortina War took place in May 1861. Cortina invaded Zapata County and attacked the county seat Zapata. He was defeated by Confederate Captain Santos Benavides in the Battle of Carrizo and retreated into Mexico after losing eighteen men. By the end of the wars, at least 245 men had been killed, most of whom were Cortinistas.
- In the 1870s, future Mexican President Porfirio Díaz received a large monetary contribution from the citizens of Brownsville to remove Juan Cortina under the pretext that he was rustling cattle across the border. In July 1875, Cortina was arrested and taken to Mexico City, where he would remain until his death in 1894.

== In popular culture ==
Mexican author Carmen Boullosa published the novel Texas in 2013, which presents a fictionalized account of the First Cortina War. The novel was translated into English by Samantha Schnee in 2014.

== Gallery ==
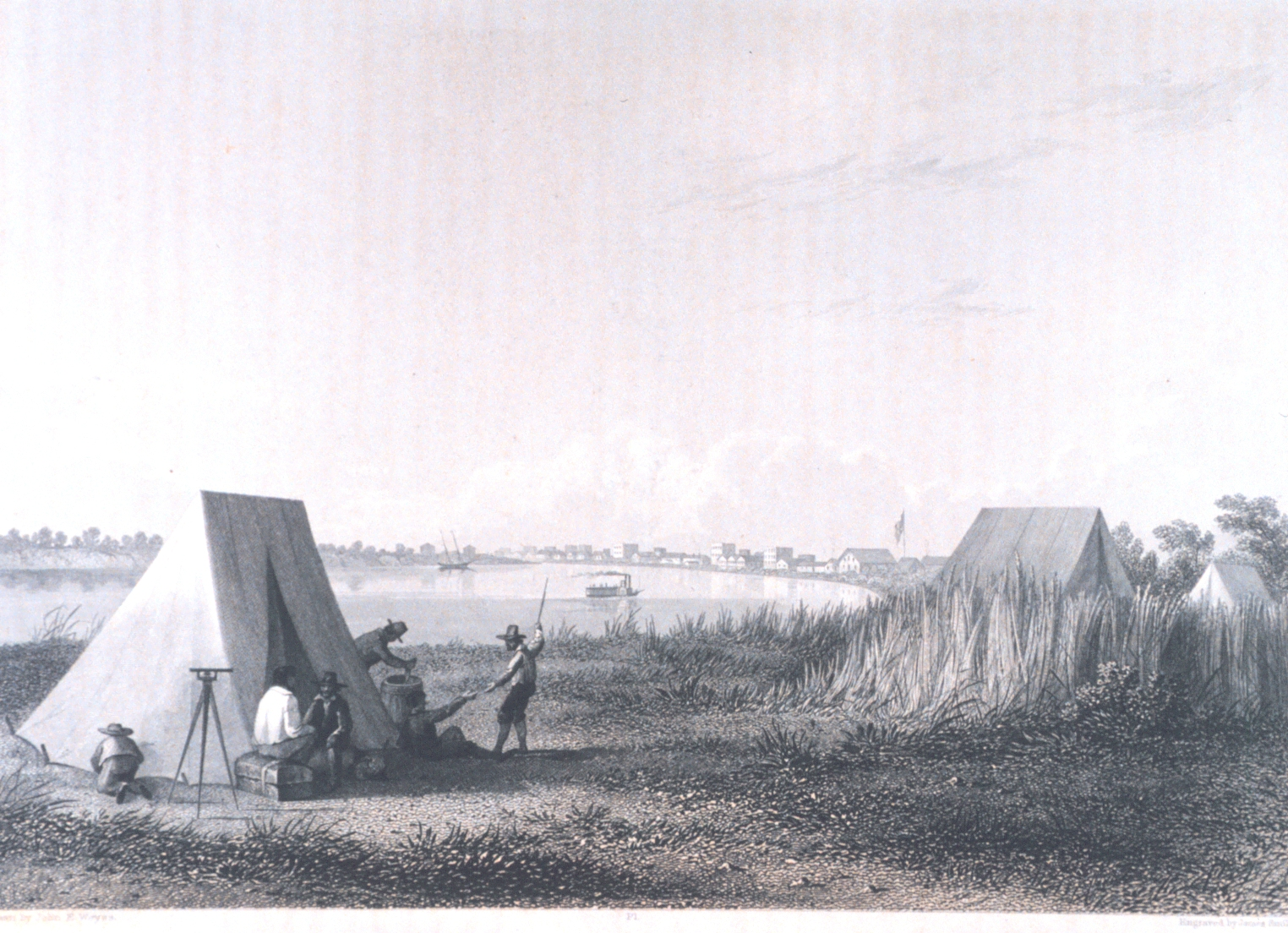
Brownsville, Texas, circa 1857

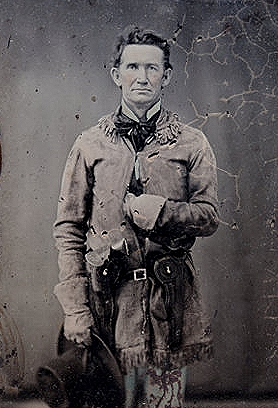
John "Rip" Ford was a colonel of the 2nd Texas Cavalry during the American Civil War.

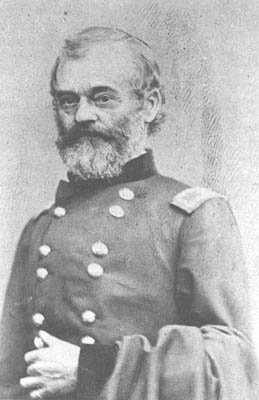
Major Samuel P. Heintzelman played a key role in the defeat of Juan Cortina.

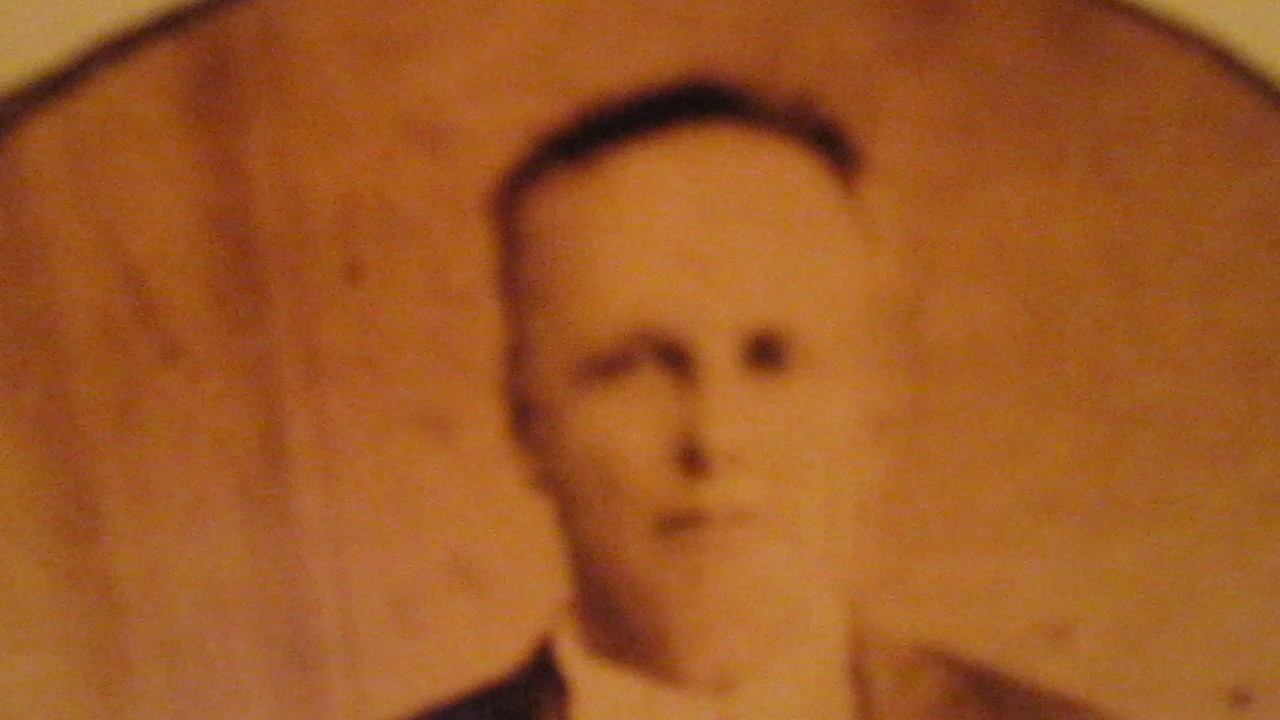
Copy of Santos Benavides photograph in the Republic of the Rio Grande Capitol Building Museum in Laredo.

== See also ==
- Garza Revolution
- Nogales Uprising
- Bandit War
- Mexican Revolution
