= Siege of Fort Texas =

1846 siege during the Mexican-American War

Coordinates: 25°53′54″N 97°29′32″W

- Part of the Texas Campaign of the Mexican–American War
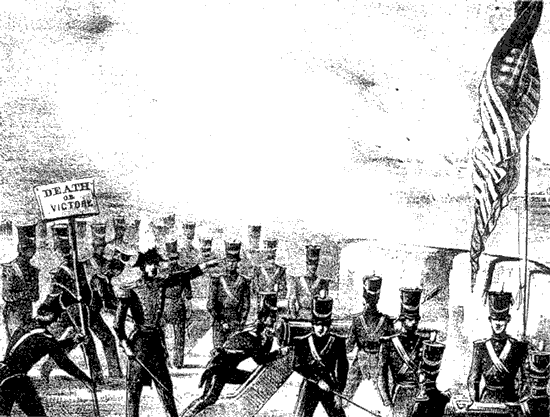
- Major Jacob Brown with his sword, commanding the defenders of Fort Texas, one of which is holding a sign stating, "Death or Victory".
| Date | May 3–9, 1846 |
| Location | near Brownsville, Texas |

Belligerents
| United States | Mexico |

Commanders and leaders
| Jacob Brown (DOW); Earl Van Dorn | Mariano Arista; Francisco Mejía; Pedro de Ampudia |

Strength
| 500 infantry men | 1,600; 14 artillery pieces |

Casualties and losses
| 2 killed 10 wounded | 2 killed 2 wounded 3 prisoners wounded |

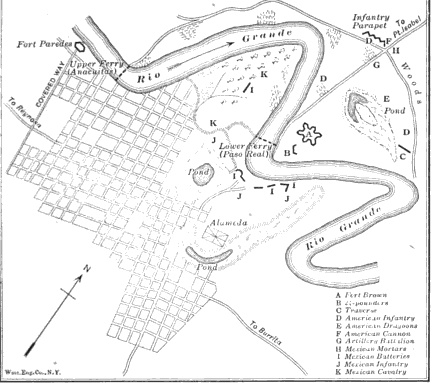
Disposition of American and Mexican forces

The siege of Fort Texas marked the beginning of active campaigning by the armies of the United States and Mexico during the Mexican–American War. The battle is sometimes called the siege of Fort Brown.

Fort Texas was located on the northern side of the Rio Grande opposite the Mexican town of Matamoros. At the time, the Rio Grande border with the United States was disputed by Mexico. On 3 May 1846, the fort was fired upon and besieged by Mexican forces under General Mariano Arista. The main American force under General Zachary Taylor advanced from Port Isabel and successfully engaged Arista at Palo Alto on 8 May. The following day, the Mexicans were routed at Resaca de la Palma, 4 miles (6 km) from Fort Texas. The siege was lifted, with the Mexican force withdrawing south of the Rio Grande. Taylor occupied Matamoros and continued operations in northeastern Mexico.

== Background ==
On 28 March 1846, the Army of Occupation under General Zachary Taylor reached the north bank of the Rio Grande. Taylor ordered Captain Joseph K. Mansfield to construct an earthen star fort for 800 men named "Fort Texas". The fort was garrisoned by 500 men under Major Jacob Brown, including the 7th Infantry, Capt. Allen Lowd's four 18-pounders, and Lt. Braxton Bragg's field battery.

Mexican General Francisco Mejia's 2,000 men also erected similar fortifications, including for his twenty cannons, for 800 men upstream at the Las Anacuitas ferry crossing, called Fort Paredes; and two redoubts about 800 yards from Taylor's camp, placing it in a crossfire. The largest cannon was a 12-pounder.

Following the Thornton Affair, Mexican forces under General Mariano Arista crossed the Rio Grande and then besieged Fort Texas, after realizing that on 1 May Taylor had taken most of his forces to Fort Polk on Point Isabel to protect his supply depot.

== Siege ==
At dawn on 3 May 1846, Mexican forces bombarded Fort Texas, but were silenced by the American response, although the Mexican artillery down the river was more successful. Lowd attempted to set fire to Matamoros with "hot shot". Mexican fire stopped at 7:30 pm, the American's at 11 pm. On 4 May, Mexican guns and a mortar were placed on the northern bank of the Rio Grande and on 5 May General Pedro de Ampudia arrived with 1,230 men and four guns. Since Ampudia's artillery was too light to breach the earthworks and the infantry disinclined to make an assault, the siege continued until 9 May with General Antonio Canales Rosillo's irregular cavalry astride the Point Isabel road preventing supplies from reaching the fort.

Captain Edgar S. Hawkins took command of Fort Texas when Major Brown was mortally wounded on 6 May at ten o'clock. When Arista demanded the fort's surrender at 4:30 that afternoon, Hawkins responded with "My interpreter is not skilled in your language but if I understand you correctly...I must respectfully decline to surrender."

As soon as it became clear Taylor was leaving Fort Polk, Arista moved his army from his camp at Tanques del Ramiereno to block Taylor's path leading to the battles of Palo Alto and Resaca de la Palma.

== Aftermath ==
Though the confrontation at Fort Texas lasted six days, with periods of heavy cannon fire, casualties were remarkably low. Only two U.S. soldiers died in the bombardment. Major Brown was struck in the leg by a cannonball on May 6 and survived for several days only to die on May 9, just hours before the siege ended. Despite his wound, Major Brown had helped maintain troop morale throughout the siege, thus contributing to the success of the defense of the Fort. Mexican leaders reported two killed and two wounded from American artillery fire during the siege. The effect of artillery fire on the civilian population of Matamoros is unknown. Laundress and cook Sarah Borginnes, who refused to take shelter during the siege but instead provided food and coffee to the American troops, was named "Heroine of Fort Brown" by the American newspapers.

== See also ==
- List of battles of the Mexican–American War
- List of conflicts in the United States
- Saint Patrick's Battalion

== Sources ==
- Brooks, N.C., A Complete History of The Mexican War
- Handbook of Texas Online, Fort Brown,
- Alcaraz, Ramon. Apuntes para La Historia De La Guerra Estes Mexico y los Estados-Unidos Tipografia De Manuel Payno Mexico (City) 1848
