= Jacob Brown (Texas soldier) =

American army officer (1789–1846)

- Born: July 19, 1789; Charlton, Massachusetts, U.S.
- Died: May 9, 1846 (aged 56) Fort Texas (later Fort Brown), Texas, U.S.
- Buried: Alexandria National Cemetery Pineville, Rapides Parish, Louisiana, U.S.
- Allegiance: United States
- Branch: United States Army
- Service years: 1812–1846 (US Army)
- Rank: Major
- Commands: 7th Infantry (August 1845 - May 9, 1846)
- Conflicts: Mexican-American War; Siege of Fort Texas
- Children: Sarah Jane Brown Van Vliet (1824 - 1917) Mary Augusta Brown Moore (1828 - 1912)

Jacob Brown Jr. (July 19, 1789 – May 9, 1846) was an American Army officer and commander of the U.S. 7th Infantry during the Mexican–American War. Brown was mortally wounded on May 6, 1846 while leading American forces at the Siege of Fort Texas near Brownsville, Texas.

== Early life ==
Jacob Brown Jr. was born in Charlton, Massachusetts, on July 19, 1789. His parents were Jacob Sr. and Mary (née Wells) Brown. Jacob Sr. was a revolutionary soldier during the American Revolutionary War. Jacob Sr. died in 1845 in Clarksburg, Massachusetts.

== Military career ==
Brown enlisted in the 11th United States Infantry on August 3, 1812, during the War of 1812. He was commissioned as an ensign in the 11th Infantry on April 15, 1814. On May 17, 1815, Brown transferred to the 6th Infantry where he served as regimental quartermaster from April 16 to June 1, 1821. He eventually became a lieutenant in the 7th Infantry. In 1825 he was promoted to captain, and to the rank of major in 1843. In August of 1845 he assumed command of the 7th Infantry.

Under orders from Zachary Taylor, Brown's regiment was selected to garrison the earthen fort across the Rio Grande from Matamoros, Mexico. Major Jacob Brown commanded the 7th Infantry in the early stage of the siege of Fort Texas.

Brown was hit by a shell on May 6, 1846, during the siege and died from his wounds on May 9, 1846. Fort Texas was later renamed Fort Brown in his honor, with the city of Brownsville, Texas deriving its name from the fort.

== Promotions ==
Private, August 3, 1812
Ensign, April 15, 1814
Third Lieutenant, May 1, 1814
Second Lieutenant, September 1, 1814
First Lieutenant, August 18, 1819
Captain, April 7, 1825
Major, February 27, 1843
