= Carne Muerto =

Comanche war chief (c. 1832–c. 1860s0)

- Tehcap

Comanche leader
- In office c. 1850s – c. 1860s

war chief, Quahadi band

Personal details
- Born: c. 1832 Edward's Plateau, Texas
- Died: c. 1860s
- Parent(s): Santa Anna, father
- Mother tongue: Comanche language

Military service
- Battles/wars: Battle of Little Robe Creek

Carne Muerto, or Tehcap (possibly Comanche: Tahkapʉ̠; c. 1832 – 1860s), was a war chief of the Quahadi band of the Comanche Indians.

He rose to fame first as a son of Santa Anna, and used that status to survive capture by John "Rip" Ford and his Texas Rangers. In 1850, Carne Muerto escaped U.S. Army custody, then became known as a ferocious war chief late in the 1850s for his relentless raiding of Euro-American settlements.

== Early life ==
Born in about 1832 to Comanche War Chief Santa Anna and one of his wives, Carne Muerto (translated from Comanche and Spanish as "Death Meat"; the more logical name in Spanish would be "Carne Muerta", which means "Dead Meat"), as he was known in Texas, and on the Comancheria , grew up as part of the Penateka band of the Comanches. The Penateka, in the days of Old Owl, Buffalo Hump, Yellow Wolf, and Santa Anna, up to the Great Raid, were the most numerous of the Comanche, but they had borne the brunt of the fighting, and disease finished what war had started. During the cholera epidemic of 1848–49, most of its remaining members died, and the band split up. His father dead, Carne Muerto and his mother went to live with the Quahadi band of the Comanche Indians.

== Capture by John "Rip" Ford ==
In June 1850, reported to be 18 years of age, Carne Muerto was captured by a Texas Rangers detachment led by John "Rip" Ford. According to the Rangers, Carne Muerto told the Rangers at once he was the son of Santa Anna, still a very well-known and respected peace chief who had once been a war chief second only to Buffalo Hump, and that if he was well treated the Rangers would be rewarded. (Carne Muerto prudently did not tell the Rangers that his father was dead, which he had to know, as he reportedly was there.) Ford, no lover of any Comanche, but believing Santa Anna was alive, and knowing well what he had once done in the border wars, was aware of the potential for disaster if Santa Anna's son was mistreated or killed while in captivity. Reportedly treated with kindness, the young warrior was held by the Rangers, and then by the Army, for almost a year before he escaped.

When Carne Muerto, a prisoner at Fort McIntosh, was moved to Fort Merrill in January 1851, Ranger Andrew Walker was put in charge of the patrol to guard the prisoner. Though that patrol ended up fighting more Comanche, Walker was under orders to make sure Carne Muerto came to no harm. Both the Rangers and the Army felt that because Carne Muerto was the son of a famous War Chief, he could potentially be traded for white captives among the Comanche under the best scenario, and in the worst case, would at least serve to show that captives should be treated humanely. Ford emphasized to the Army that should harm come to a famous Chief's son, the Comanche would take a terrible vengeance on settlers (which is why Ford insisted that Rangers remain part of Carne Muerto's guards, even while in military custody). Reportedly his mother came to Fort Merrill to plead for his release. Shortly thereafter, he escaped and rejoined the Quahadi.

== Later years ==
Carne Muerto became a war chief among the Quahadi in the mid-1850s and led repeated raids against white settlements. He was a noted leader in the resistance against white settlement of the Comancheria. He disappears from history in the early 1860s, after the Battle of Little Robe Creek.
