= 33rd Texas Cavalry Regiment =

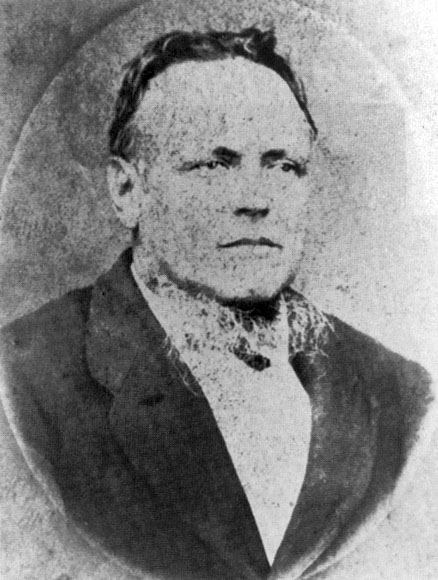
- Santos Benavides became a Colonel in the regiment.
- Active: 1862 – May 1865
- Country: Confederate States of America
- Allegiance: Confederate States of America, Texas
- Branch: Confederate States Army
- Type: Cavalry
- Size: Regiment (330 men, Apr. 1864)
- Nickname(s): 1st Texas Partisan Rangers
- Engagements: American Civil War; Battle of the Nueces (1862)

Commanders
- Notable commanders: James Duff

The 33rd Texas Cavalry Regiment was a unit of mounted volunteers from Texas that fought in the Confederate States Army during the American Civil War. San Antonio merchant James Duff organized the 14th Texas Cavalry Battalion. In summer 1862, the Texas government ordered the battalion to suppress the Union Loyal League, which was composed of German Texans who opposed secession. When a group of Germans fled toward Mexico, Duff led a contingent of soldiers in a pursuit that ended in the so-called Battle of the Nueces in August 1862. Most of the Germans were killed in what some named a massacre. The 14th Battalion was subsequently expanded into the 33rd Texas Cavalry Regiment by the addition of some Mexican-American companies raised by Santos Benavides. Benavides became a major before leaving the regiment to form his own unit in November 1863. At first, the new regiment was assigned to patrol the Rio Grande, and later its duties included defending both the Rio Grande and Corpus Christi, Texas. In April 1864, the regiment transferred to Bonham in north Texas. The unit never engaged regular Federal troops and disbanded in May 1865.

== See also ==
- List of Texas Civil War Confederate units
- Texas in the American Civil War
