= Battle of Rio Grande City =

American-Mexican battle

Coordinates: 26.3788°N 98.8203°W

- Part of the Cortina War
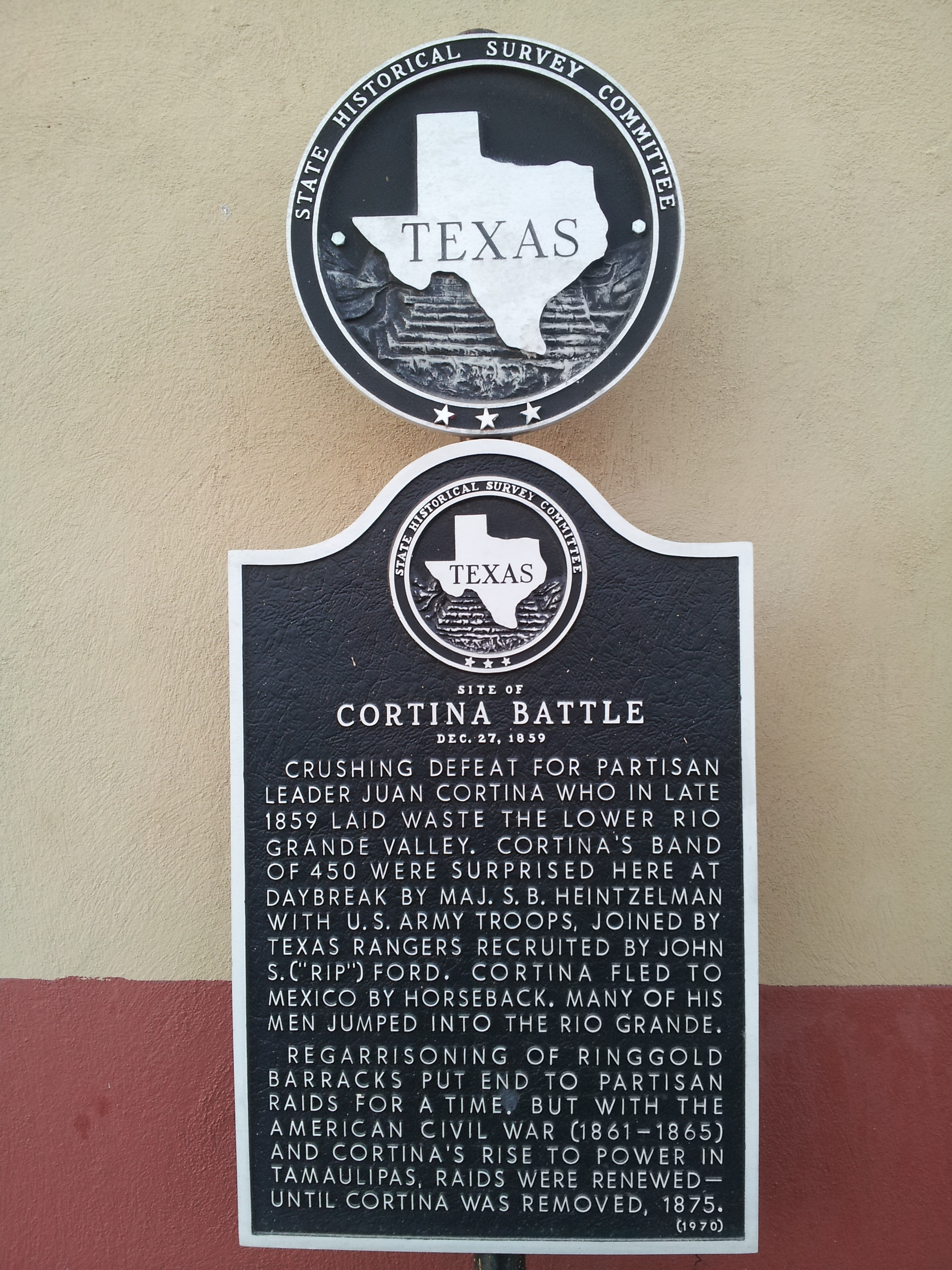
- Texas Historical Marker in Rio Grande City
Date	December 27, 1859
Location	Rio Grande City, Texas; La Bolsa, Mexico
Result	United States victory

Belligerents
(Mexico) Cortinistas	United States

Commanders and leaders
Juan Cortina	Samuel P. Heintzelman (Fort Brown); Captain Stoneman (2nd Cavalry); Major John Salmon Ford (Texas Rangers); Captain Tobin (Texas Rangers)

Strength
About 700 men	348 men

Casualties and losses
200 killed	

The Battle of Rio Grande City was a military engagement during the Cortina War between pro-Mexican Cortinistas and a group of US Army regulars supported by Texas Rangers.

== Background ==
In 1859, the United States Army moved its garrisons on the lower Rio Grande to Fort Brown, prompting Chena Cortina to attack Rio Grande City and all along the Rio Grande Valley from Laredo to the Gulf of Mexico. Governor Hardin Richard Runnels ordered Rip Ford with a detachment of State Troops (Texas Rangers) to Fort Brown, where he combined forces with Major Heintzelman and other Texas Rangers under Captain Tobin. The march there "brought to light many acts of vandalism. Houses had been robbed and fired, fences burned, property destroyed or carried into Mexico. Settlements were broken up for the time being; the inhabitants had fled for their lives. Cortina had committed these outrages upon citizens of the United States...". On 26 December, Cortina was camped in the main street of Rio Grande City.

== Battle ==
Cortina's right flank was on the Rio Grande. Major Ford's Texas Rangers were to turn the left flank of Cortina (on a little hill overlooking the town) while Major Heintzelman approached with his artillery at dawn on the 27th. At daylight, Major Ford drove in Cortina's picket, forced back a reconnoitering party, fired into Ringgold Barracks, forced it back, gained the crest of the hill and found the town empty. Cortina's artillery was on the Roma road and under a heavy fog, but Lt. Fry's detachment silenced it. Cortina's cavalry charged but Ford's troops left "Cortina's bold riders...on the ground." The Mexicans started to retreat at which time Heintzleman's troops arrived and helped Ford pursue the Mexicans to the river, killing many and forcing them to abandon their artillery.

== Aftermath ==
Cortina's forces retreated into Mexico near Guerrero and Mier. Major Heintzelman moved up the Rio Grande to Roma while Ford marched to Brownsville forming a new company of eighty-three Texas Rangers. On 2 February 1860, Ford and his Texas Rangers were placed under the command of Major Heintzelman and was responsible for clearing "the country of robbing bands" and defending the steamer Ranchero's passage from Rio Grande City to Brownsville from Cortina. On 4 February, Ford and forty-eight Rangers crossed into Mexico, confronted Cortina's forces around La Bolsa and forced them to flee. Ford stayed on the Mexican side of the Rio Grande until 6 February when he received assurances the Ranchero would not be attacked. The Ranchero reached Brownsville safely on 8 February.

Lt. Col. Robert E. Lee relieved Major Heintzelman and the Mexican authorities offered to restrain "their citizens from making predatory descents upon the territory and people of Texas...this was the last active operation of the Cortina War".
