= Samuel P. Heintzelman =

U.S. Army General

Samuel Peter Heintzelman
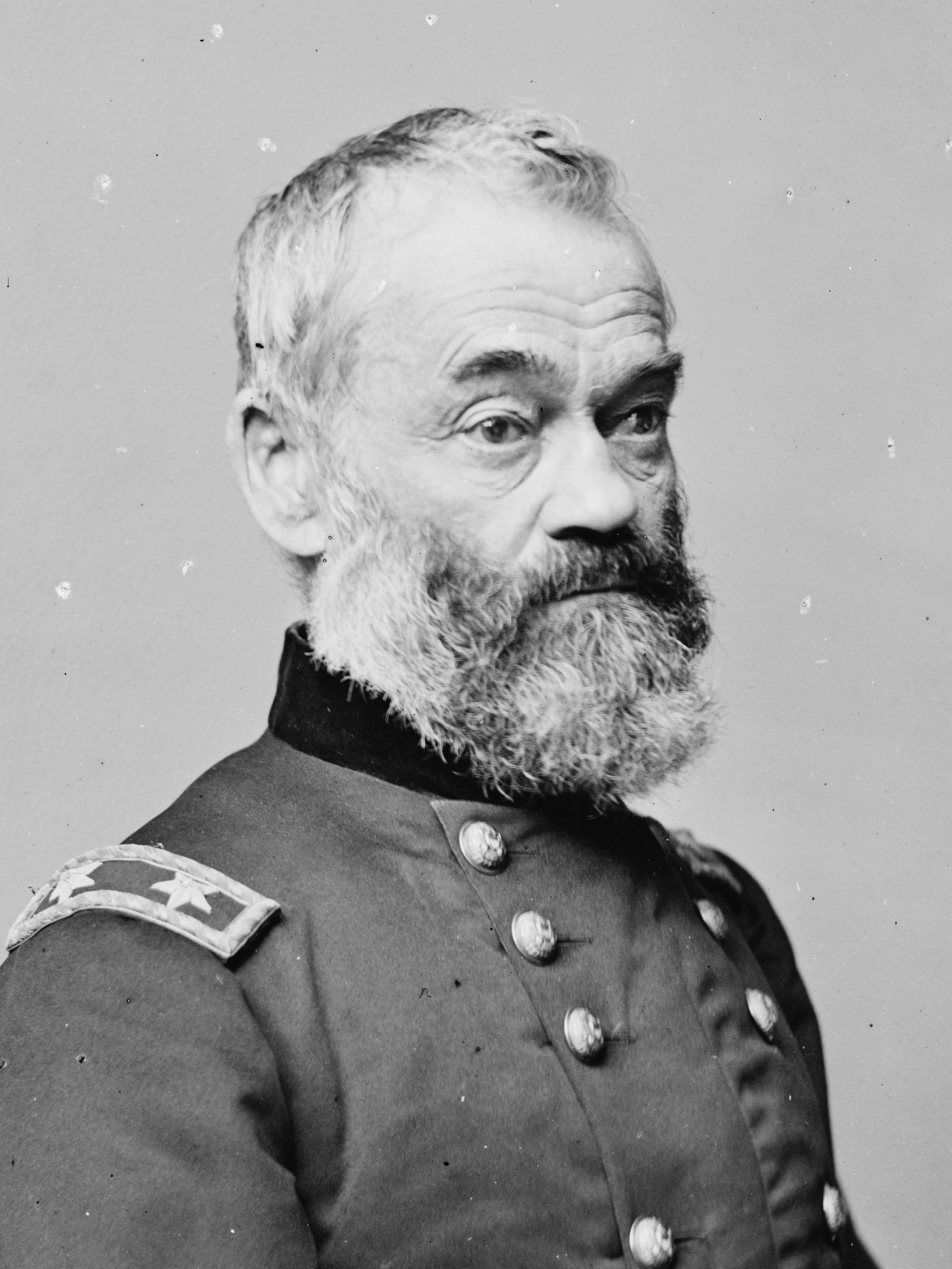
- Born: September 30, 1805; Manheim, Pennsylvania, U.S.
- Died: May 1, 1880 (aged 74); Washington, D.C., U.S.
- Burial place: Forest Lawn Cemetery, Buffalo, New York
- Military career
- Allegiance: United States of America
- Branch: United States Army; Union Army
- Service years: 1826–1869
- Rank: Major General
- Commands: III Corps; XXII Corps
- Conflicts: Second Seminole War; Mexican–American War; Battle of Huamantla; Action of Atlixco; Yuma War; Battle of Coyote Canyon; Battle of the Gila River; Cortina Troubles; Battle of La Ebonal; Battle of Rio Grande City; American Civil War; Manassas campaign; First Battle of Bull Run; Peninsula campaign; Battle of Yorktown; Battle of Williamsburg; Battle of Seven Pines; Seven Days Battles; Battle of Oak Grove; Battle of Savage's Station; Battle of Glendale (WIA); Battle of Malvern Hill; Northern Virginia campaign; Second Battle of Bull Run; Battle of Chantilly

Signature
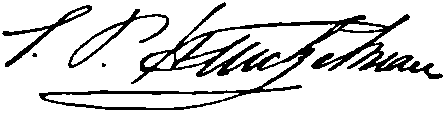

Samuel Peter Heintzelman (September 30, 1805 – May 1, 1880) was a United States Army general. He served in the Seminole War, the Mexican–American War, the Yuma War and the Cortina Troubles. During the early months of the American Civil War, he was a prominent figure, rising to the command of a corps.

The World War II Liberty ship SS Samuel Heintzelman, launched on 30 September 1942, was named in his honor.

== Early life and military service ==
Heintzelman was born in Manheim, Pennsylvania, to Peter and Ann Elizabeth Grubb Heintzelman. His paternal grandparents were German immigrants to the American colonies, while his maternal side was of English and Scottish descent, with ancestors arriving during the colonial era in the 17th century. He graduated from the United States Military Academy in 1826, 17th in a class of 41. and was commissioned a brevet second lieutenant in the 3rd U.S. Infantry, July 1, 1826, then in the 2nd U.S. Infantry and served on the Northern frontier at Fort Gratiot, Fort Mackinac, and Fort Brady. On March 4, 1833, he was promoted to first lieutenant and served on quartermaster's duty in Florida during the Second Seminole War. On July 7, 1838, he was appointed captain in the Quartermaster's Department, remaining in Florida with the 2nd Infantry until the close of the war in 1842. In 1844, He married Margaret Stuart of Albany, NY. In 1847, during the Mexican–American War, he joined General Winfield Scott's army in Mexico, taking part in several engagements, for which he was appointed brevet major on October 9, 1847. In 1848–49, he accompanied his regiment around Cape Horn to California, and for several years served in California and the Arizona Territory.

In December 1851, Major Heintzelman led the Yuma Expedition from the post of San Diego to put down the Yuma uprising, called the Yuma War. His expedition established Fort Yuma, and peace was made in October 1852. He received the brevet of lieutenant colonel for his conduct in the campaign against the Yuma Indians, and on March 3, 1855, he was promoted to major of the 1st U.S. Infantry and served with that unit on the Texas frontier. In 1859, during the First Cortina War in Texas, he was largely responsible for the defeat of Juan Cortina's forces.

Heintzelman was the first president of the Sonora Exploring and Mining Company, which established Cerro Colorado, a mining town in southern Arizona. The town became famous during the American Civil War for the massacre of mine employees by Mexican outlaws and for buried treasure.

== Civil War ==
When the Civil War began, Heintzelman was promoted to colonel of the 17th U.S. Infantry and brigadier general of volunteers in May 1861. He led a division at First Bull Run in July and was wounded in the elbow.

Heintzelman was in overall command of the 2nd Michigan Infantry regiment that was responsible for the raid, ransacking, and devastation of Pohick Church in Lorton, Virginia, on November 12, 1861. The historic church was built in 1769 by George Washington, George Mason, and George William Fairfax, among others, and restored after the War of 1812 by President Martin Van Buren, John Quincy Adams, and Francis Scott Key, among others. This ransacking caused the loss of a myriad of irreplaceable artifacts.

In March 1862, President Lincoln organized the Army of the Potomac into corps, and Heintzelman received the III Corps of the Army of the Potomac in the Peninsula Campaign. His corps played a prominent role in the Siege of Yorktown where Heintzelman and division commander Fitz-John Porter were among the first to use the Union Army Balloon Corps. The corps bore the brunt of the fighting at Williamsburg and saw significant action at Fair Oaks, Oak Grove, and Glendale. His corps was temporarily attached to the Army of Virginia and took part in the Second Battle of Bull Run. He was commissioned as a brevet brigadier general in the regular army for the battle of Fair Oaks and a major general of volunteers for the battle of Williamsburg. At the Battle of Glendale, Heintzelman was bruised in the wrist by a spent bullet and was unable to use his left arm for a few weeks. After the Seven Days Battles, he was promoted to major general of volunteers to rank from May 5. His popularity and confidence in the army were eclipsed by the aggressive nature of his subordinate division commanders Joseph Hooker and Philip Kearny, and he did not display any notable leadership or tactical prowess in either the Peninsula Campaign or Second Bull Run, although following the Union retreat from Gaines Mill, he was one of three corps commanders to advocate launching a counterattack against the Army of Northern Virginia.

The Second Bull Run campaign had been hard on the III Corps, which sustained heavy losses, including one of its division commanders, and had come close to being driven from the field in panic. On September 4, Heintzelman was relieved from command, being judged as too old and insufficiently aggressive. He was reassigned to the Washington D.C. defenses and served there until being transferred to the Northern Department in January 1864. He remained in that post for ten months, but received no further assignments for the rest of the war. Heintzelman's volunteer commission expired on August 24, 1865 and he reverted to the regular army rank of colonel. He served on army boards of inquiry and on occupation duty in Texas as part of Reconstruction.

== Retirement and death ==
Heintzelman retired on February 22, 1869 and was granted a promotion to major general, entitling him to the pension of that rank. After leaving the army, he served on the board of directors of several companies in New York and Washington D.C. before retiring completely in 1874. He died in Washington on May 1, 1880, at the age of 74. He is buried in Forest Lawn Cemetery, Buffalo, New York. According to his doctor, he died of complications arising from an attack of pleurisy during the Peninsula Campaign eighteen years earlier.

His grandson Stuart Heintzelman, a West Point alumnus of the class of 1899, served in World War I and rose to the rank of Major General.

== See also ==
- List of American Civil War generals (Union)

Preceded by None	Commander of the III Corps (Army of the Potomac); March 13 – October 30, 1862	Succeeded by George Stoneman
