= Fort Brown =

- U.S. National Register of Historic Places
- U.S. National Historic Landmark District
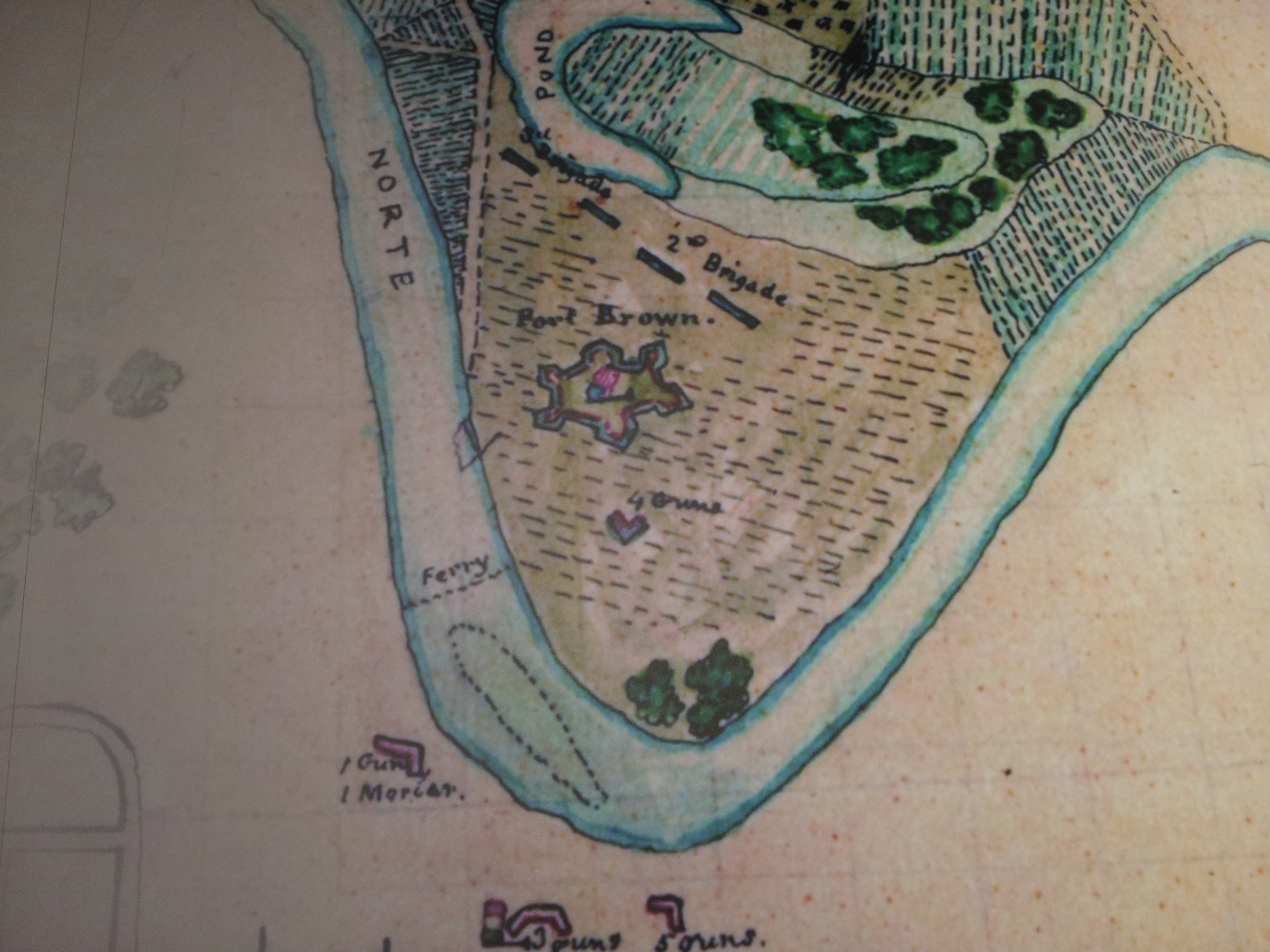
- Period map of Fort Brown in the park exhibit.

- Location within Texas Location within the United States
- Location: South edge of Brownsville off International Boulevard, Brownsville, Texas
- Coordinates: 25°53′54″N 97°29′32″W
- Area: 20 acres (8.1 ha)
- Built: 1846
- NRHP reference No.: 66000811

Significant dates
- Added to NRHP: October 15, 1966
- Designated NHLD: December 19, 1960

Fort Brown (originally Fort Texas) was a military post of the United States Army in Cameron County, Texas, during the latter half of the 19th century and the early part of the 20th century. Established in 1846, it was the first US Army military outpost of the recently annexed state. Confederate Army troops stationed there saw action during the American Civil War. In the early 20th century, it was garrisoned in relation to military activity over border conflicts with Mexico. Surviving elements of the fort were designated as a National Historic Landmark in 1960.

== Early years ==
In 1846, Captain Joseph K. Mansfield directed the construction of a star-shaped earthwork for 800 men called "Fort Texas" on the northern side of the Rio Grande "by the order from General [Zachary] Taylor to command the city of Matamoros" south of the river.

The next year, the fort was besieged during the opening of the Mexican–American War. During the siege of Fort Texas, two Americans were killed, including Major Jacob Brown and George Oakes Stevens (of Vermont) of the 2nd Dragoons. In honor of the fallen major, General Taylor renamed the post as Fort Brown. In 1849, the city of Brownsville, Texas, was established not far from the fort's grounds.

== Cortina ==
While in command at the fort, Major Samuel P. Heintzelman coordinated with John Salmon Ford in the Cortina Troubles, culminating in the Battle of Rio Grande City in 1859.

== Civil War ==
In 1861, Confederate Colonel John "Rip" Ford occupied the fort, with a garrison there until 1863. The Confederate forces were finally driven out by Union forces under General Nathaniel P. Banks, who had his troops camped in tents erected at the fort site. This Union occupation ended in 1864, when Confederate forces under General James E. Slaughter and Colonel Ford took control of the area. They held the post until the end of the war, when it was occupied again by Union forces under General Egbert Brown.

== Postbellum ==
From 1867–1869, a permanent US Army fort was constructed under the supervision of Captain William A. Wainwright. In 1882, Dr. William Crawford Gorgas was assigned to the hospital at Fort Brown during the height of a yellow fever outbreak. Using Fort Brown as his base of operations, Gorgas studied the disease for several years. He was sent to Cuba during the Spanish–American War.

== Brownsville raid ==
A unit of African-American soldiers, known as Buffalo Soldiers, was stationed at Fort Brown. White residents of town resented the presence of the Black soldiers, and tensions rose. On August 13 and 14, 1906, unknown persons "raided" Brownsville, indiscriminately shooting bystanders. They wounded one White man and killed White resident Frank Natus. The townspeople of Brownsville quickly blamed the Black soldiers for the incident. The Army investigated the matter and concluded that the Black soldiers were guilty although their supervising officers supported them and said that they had been at the fort. President Theodore Roosevelt, ordered all 168 Black soldiers to be discharged "without honor."

In 1972, the Army conducted another investigation, led by Lt. Col. William Baker. The government concluded that the Black soldiers had not been responsible. They were given posthumous honorable discharges, but only two of the original 168 men were still alive. The two men received compensation, but the Army did not restore the dead soldiers' pensions to which their descendants would have been entitled.

Since the late 20th century, historians have speculated about the incident. The History Channel's program History's Mysteries attributed the incident to Brownsville residents' shooting up the town with rifles using the same caliber ammunition (.45-70 ?) as the soldiers and then framing the soldiers. (Academic press books about the Brownsville Raid include The Brownsville Raid (1970/1992) and The Senator and the Sharecropper's Son: Exoneration of the Brownsville Soldiers (1997) by John D. Weaver, and Racial Borders: Black Soldiers along the Rio Grande (2010) by James Leiker.)

== First airplane to be attacked by hostile fire ==
On April 20, 1915, U.S. Signal Corps Officers Byron Q. Jones and Thomas Millings flew a Martin T over the fort to spot movements of the Mexican revolutionary leader Francisco "Pancho" Villa. The plane reached an altitude of 2,600 ft. and was up for 20 minutes. It did not cross the border into Mexico although it was fired upon by machine guns and small arms. These frequent patrols lasted for six weeks and were used more effectively in 1916.

== 124th Cavalry ==
The troopers stationed at Fort Brown from 1929 to 1945 were from the 124th Cavalry Regiment, Texas National Guard, which was one of the last mounted cavalry regiments in the United States Army. On November 18, 1940, they went into active military training. After the Japanese attack on Pearl Harbor, the division served with distinction, dismounted, in the China Burma India Theater, where a member of the unit from Fort Brown earned the theater's only Medal of Honor (awarded to Jack L. Knight, commanding F Troop).

== United States Army Air Forces use ==
During World War II, Fort Brown was transferred to the USAAF Training Command on July 7, 1943. The USAAF Gulf Coast Training Center (later the Central Flying Training Command) used the fort for flexible gunnery training until the fort was inactivated on February 1, 1946.

== Decommission ==
On February 1, 1946, Fort Brown was decommissioned and turned over to the Army Corps of Engineers on April 25, 1946. It was acquired by the City of Brownsville and Texas Southmost College in 1948.

Three areas that were once part of the post were designated a discontiguous National Historic Landmark District in 1960 in recognition of its historic importance. They include earthworks built in 1846; a cavalry barracks built in 1848; and a collection of buildings erected mainly between 1868 and 1870, including a hospital, morgue, barracks, commissary, colonel's house, and officers' quarters.

The Consolidated Appropriations Act, 2023 authorized the addition of Fort Brown (166 acres) to Palo Alto Battlefield National Historical Park.

== Gallery ==
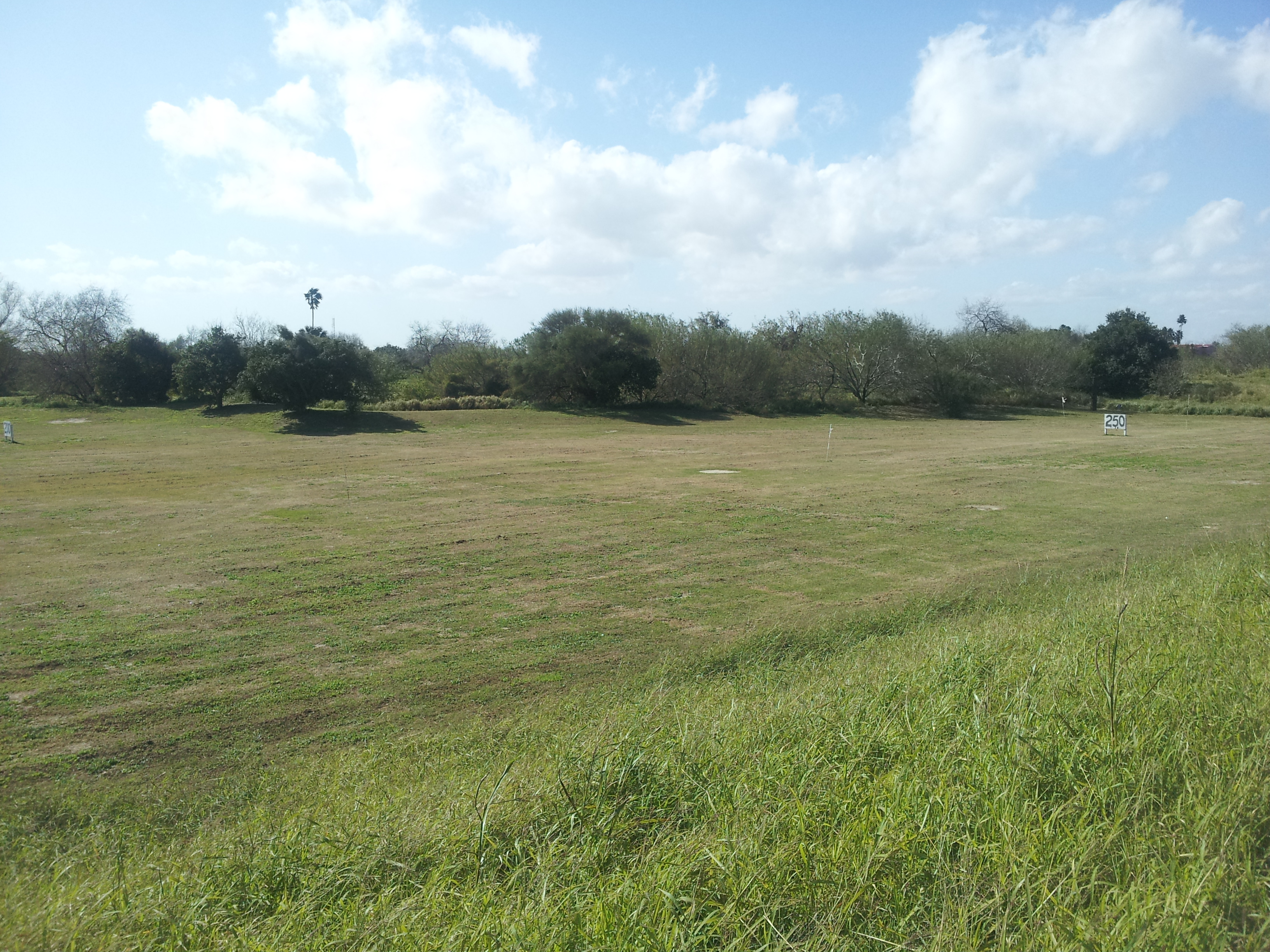
Remnants of the Fort Brown earthworks form the boundary of the Fort Brown Memorial Golf Course and the driving range.

Some of the buildings at Fort Brown

Champion Hall, which served as the medical laboratory and isolation ward until World War I

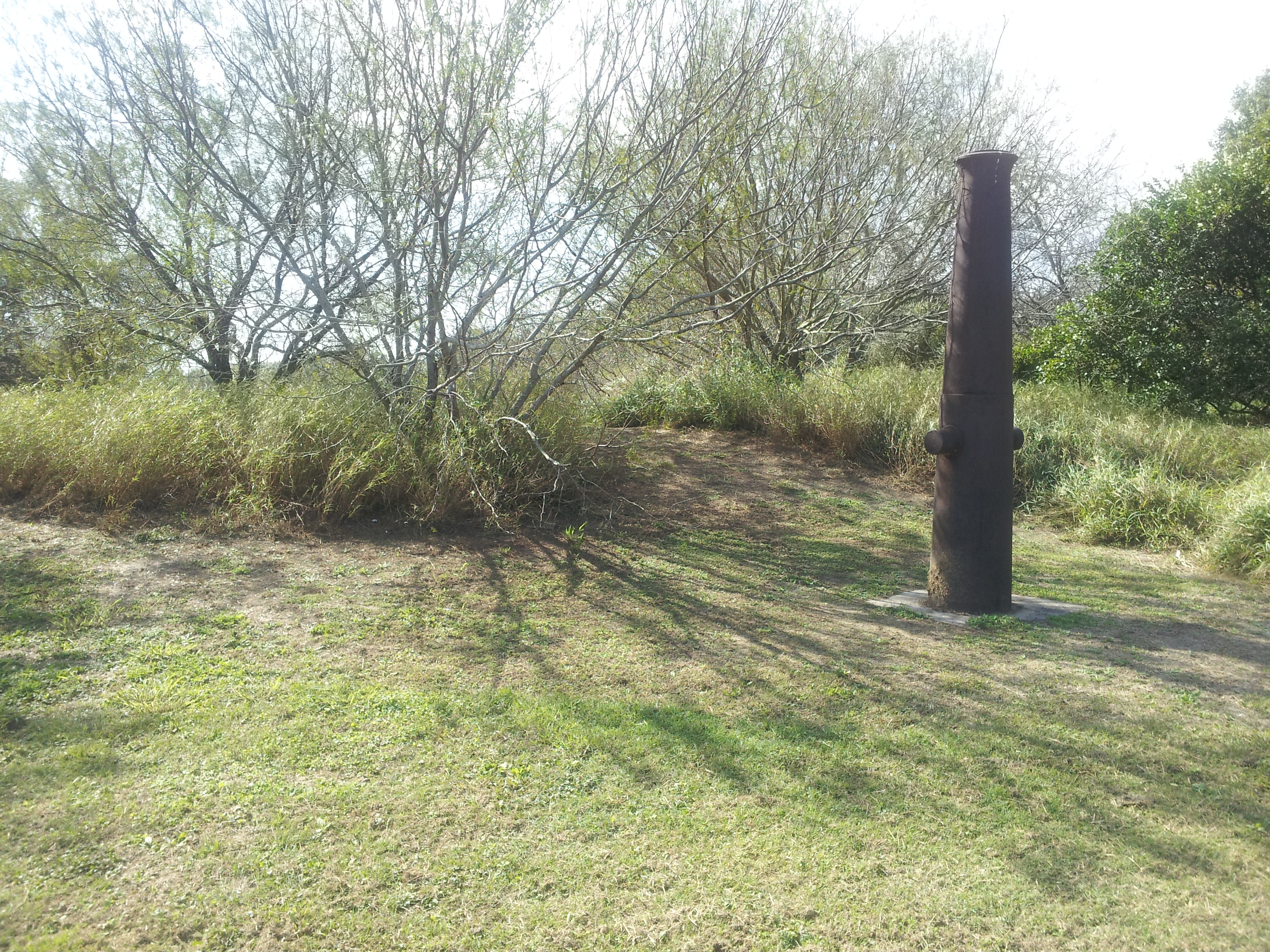
Monument to the fallen Maj. Brown

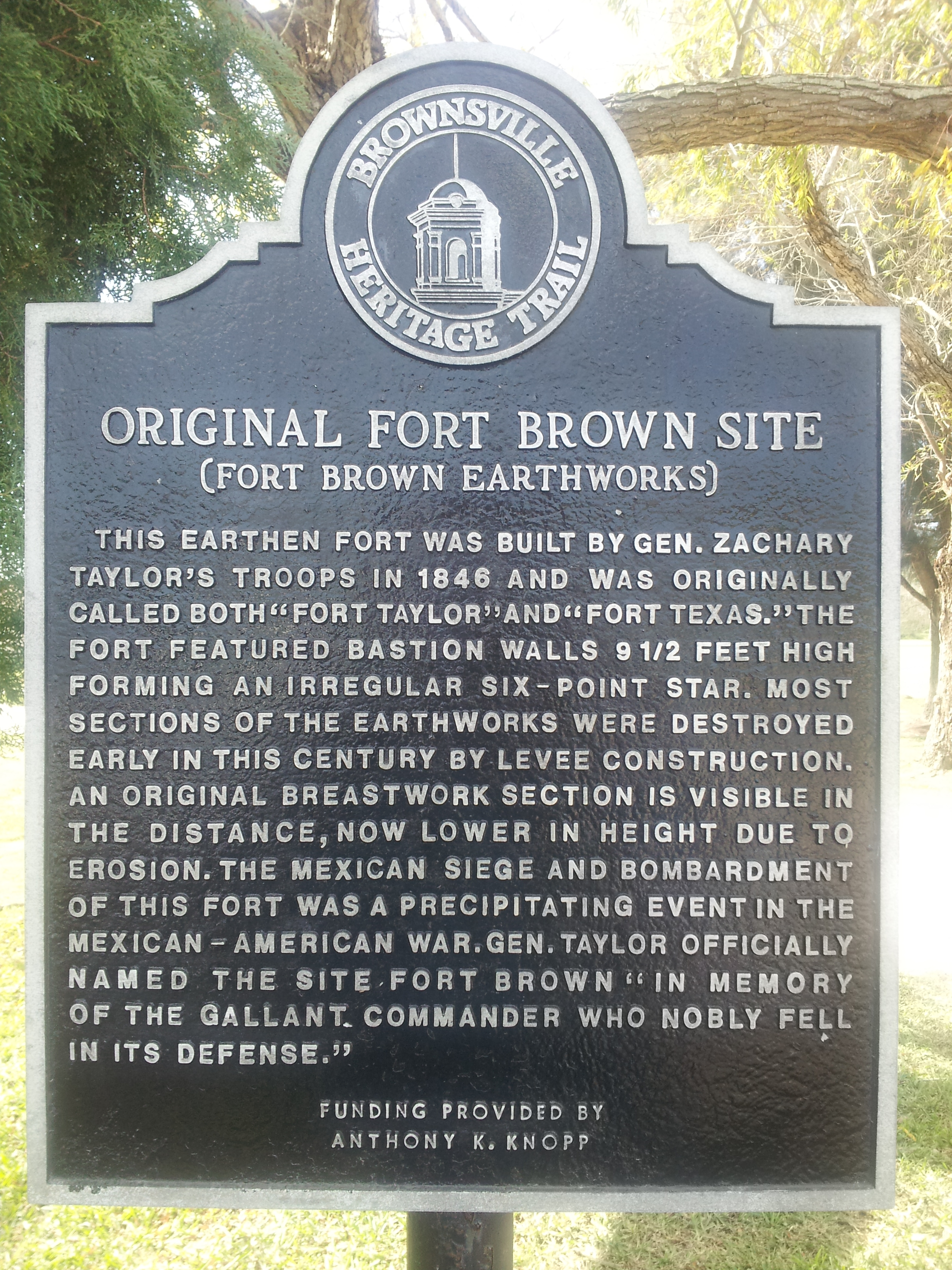
Texas historical marker

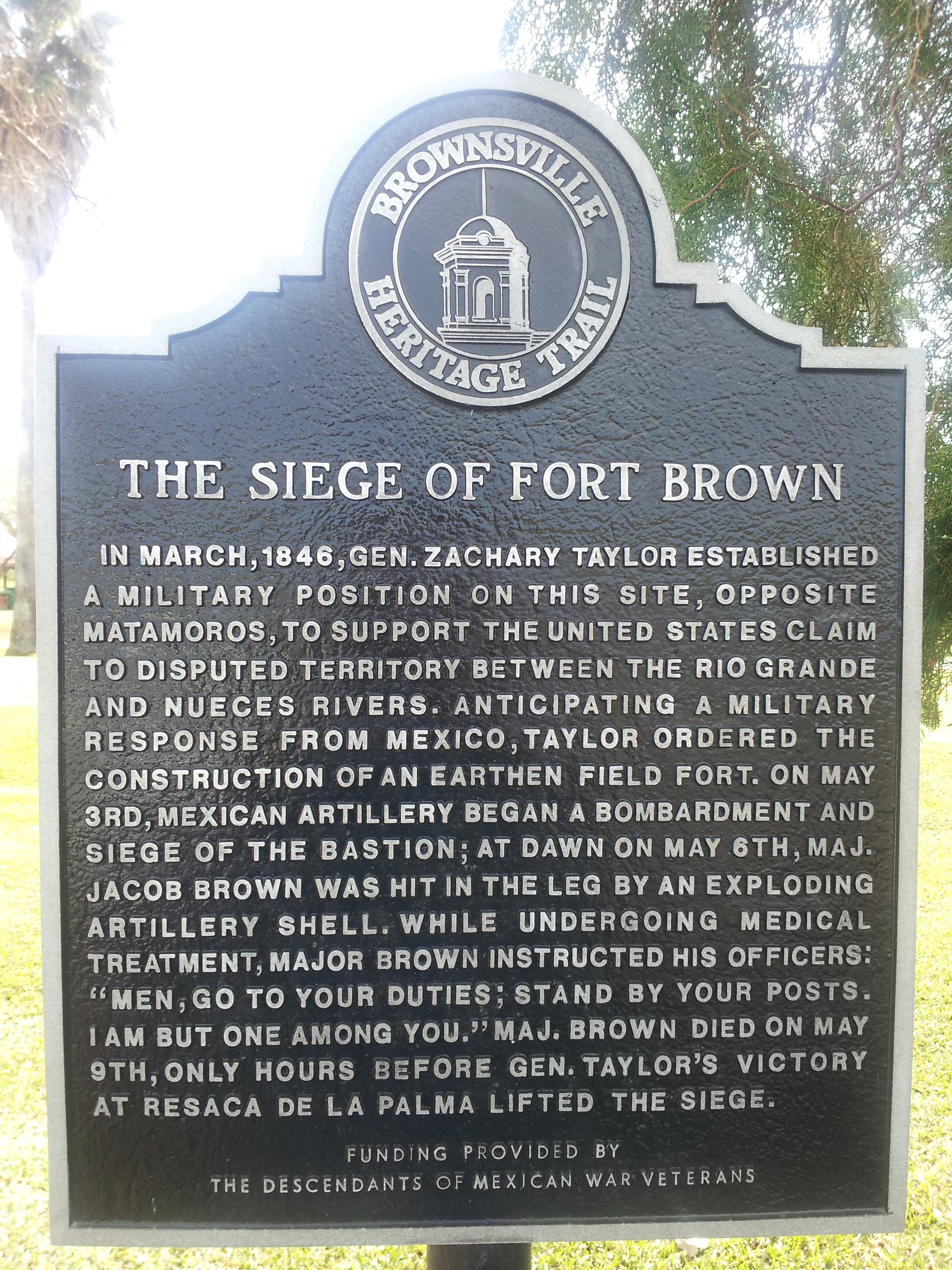
Texas historical marker commemorating the siege

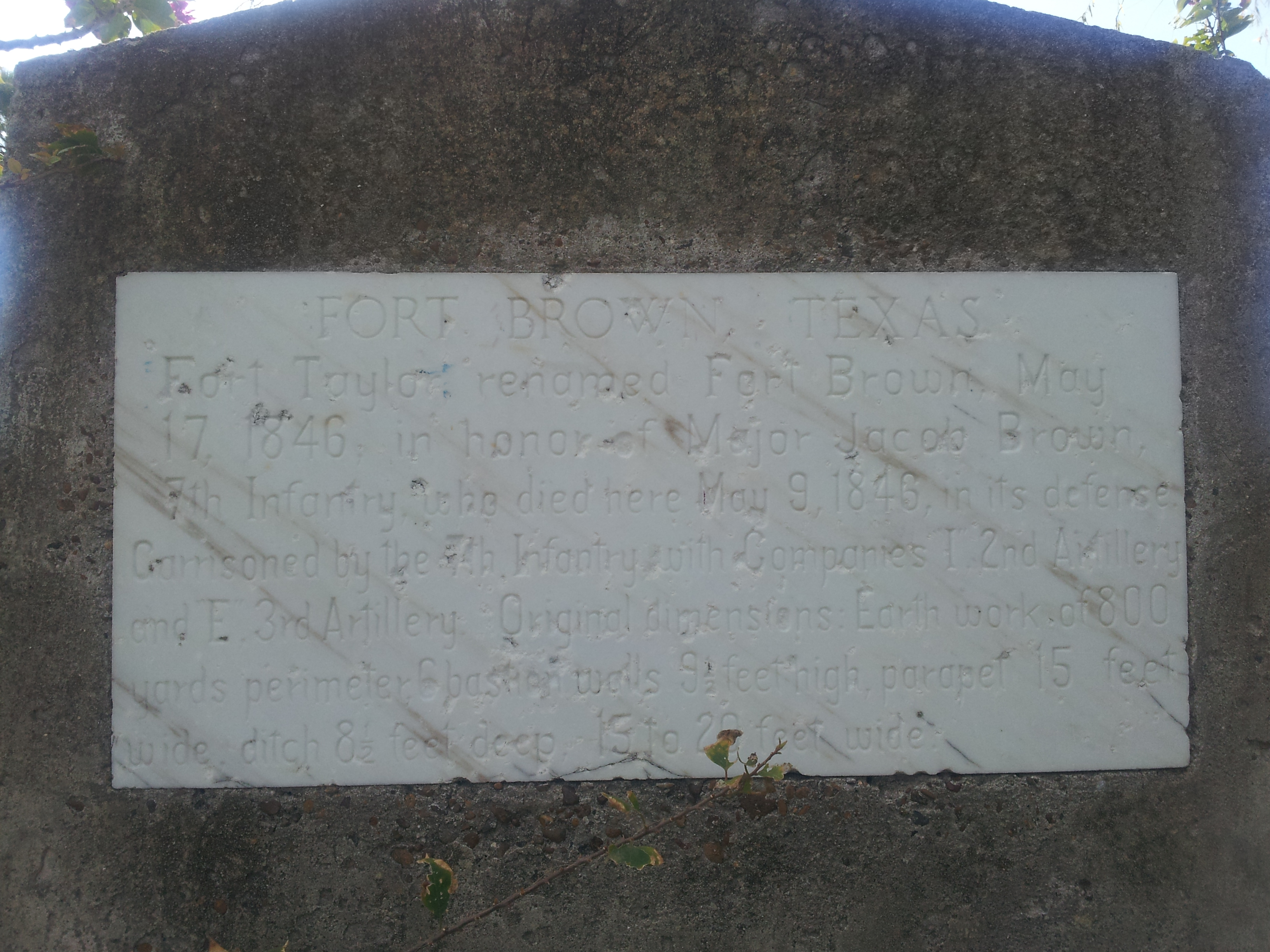
Texas historical marker explaining the dimensions of the fort

== See also ==
- List of National Historic Landmarks in Texas
- National Register of Historic Places listings in Cameron County, Texas
- Recorded Texas Historic Landmarks in Cameron County
