= Santa Rita, Texas =

Coordinates: 25°58′46″N 97°35′56″W

- Ghost town
- Interactive map of Santa Rita, Texas
- Country: United States
- State: Texas
- County: Cameron
- Established: Late 18th century

Population
  - Total: 0
- Time zone: UTC-6 (CST)
  - Summer (DST): UTC-5 (CST)
- Area code: +1-956
- Nearest Airports: Brownsville: Brownsville/South Padre Island International Airport Matamoros: General Servando Canales International Airport

Santa Rita, Texas is a ghost town near Brownsville in Cameron County, Texas, United States. It is believed to have been the first government seat in the county in 1848, and perhaps the earliest town to have been named by English-speaking people from the area. Around the late 18th century, this area was a ranching community, even before the city of Matamoros, Tamaulipas, was established in 1826. When Brownsville was finally elected as the county seat a few months later, most of the residents from Santa Rita moved to the winning townsite. By the late 1930s, nothing remained in Santa Rita. Today, Santa Rita is found near the colonia of Villa Nueva (San Pedro), a historical site in the Rio Grande Valley, northwest of the city of Brownsville.
