= John Salmon Ford =

American military officer and politician (1815–1897)

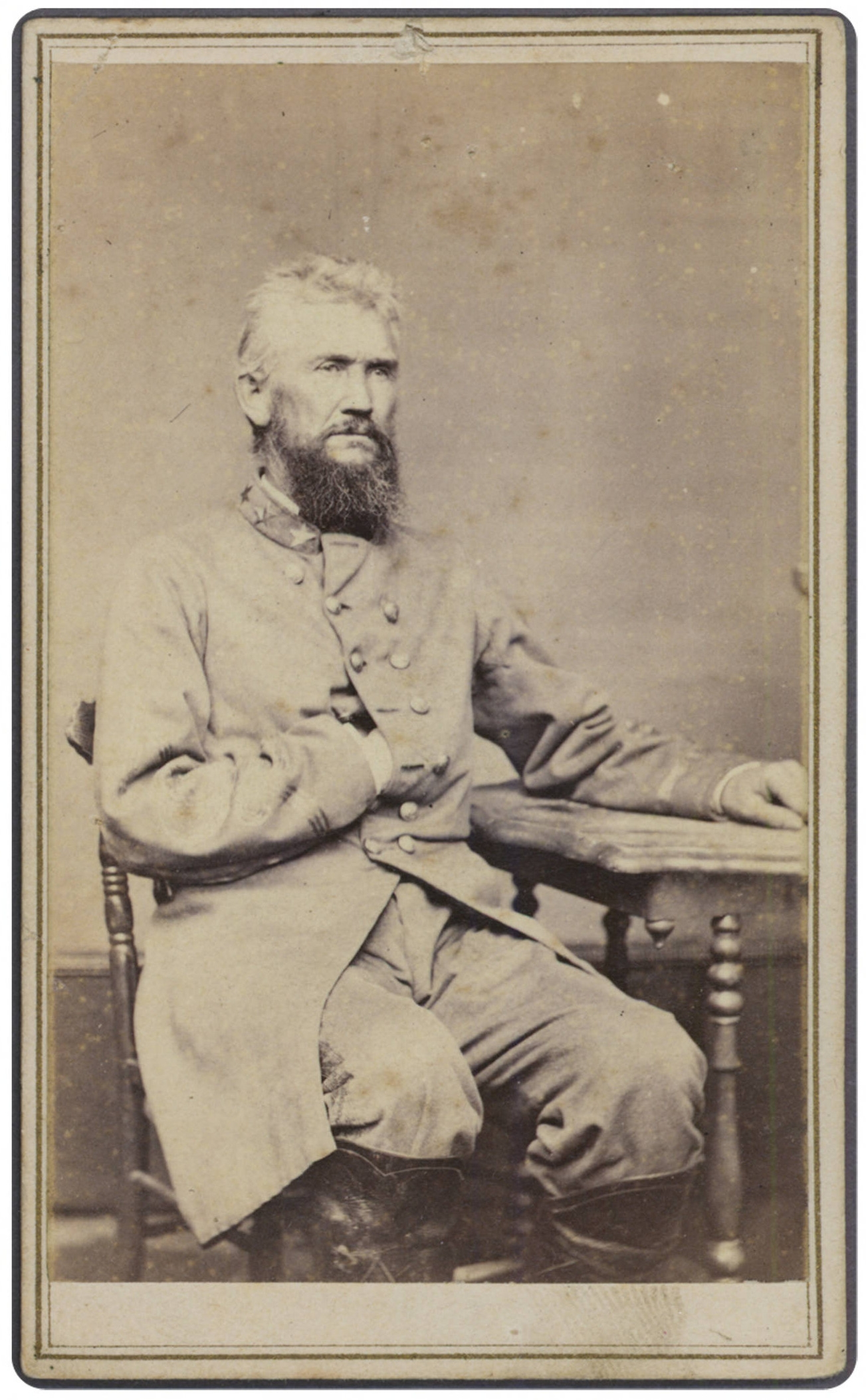
- Ford, during the American Civil War

Member of the Texas Senate
- In office January 20, 1852 – November 7, 1853
- Preceded by: Edward Burleson
- Succeeded by: Elliott McNeil Millican
- Constituency: 21st district
- In office April 18, 1876 – August 30, 1879
- Preceded by: Joseph E. Dwyer
- Succeeded by: Stephen Powers
- Constituency: 29th district

Mayor of Brownsville
- In office 1874

12th Mayor of Austin
- In office 1854–1855
- Preceded by: William P. DeNormandie
- Succeeded by: John T. Cleveland

Personal details
- Born: May 26, 1815 Greenville District, South Carolina, U.S.
- Died: November 3, 1897 (aged 82) San Antonio, Texas, U.S.
- Spouse: Mary Davis
- Occupation: Military officer, doctor, lawyer, journalist, politician
- Awards: Hall of Honor
- Nickname: "Rip"

Military service
- Allegiance: Republic of Texas; United States of America; Confederate States of America
- Branch/service: Army of the Republic of Texas (1836–1838); United States Army; Texas Militia; Confederate States Army
- Rank: Colonel (CSA); Brigadier General (Militia)
- Unit: Regiment of Texas Mounted Rifles; Texas Rangers
- Commands: Texas Scout Company (Mexican–American War), 2nd Texas Cavalry Regiment (CSA)
- Battles/wars: Indian Wars; *Antelope Hills Expedition (1859); *Battle of Little Robe Creek (1859); Merchant's War (1851–1852); Mexican–American War; First Cortina War; *Battle of Rio Grande City (1859); American Civil War; *Second Cortina War (1861); *Battle of Palmito Ranch (1865)

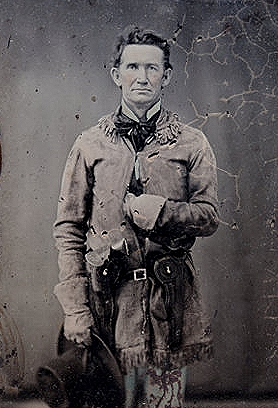
Ford as a Texas Ranger, 1858

John Salmon Ford (May 26, 1815 – November 3, 1897), also known as "Rip" Ford, was an American military officer and politician who served as the 12th mayor of Austin from 1854 to 1855 and as the mayor of Brownsville in 1874. During his long career in public service, Ford also held office as a member of the Congress of the Republic of Texas and the Texas Senate. Beyond politics, he was a doctor, a lawyer, and a journalist and newspaper owner.

Ford was a Texas Ranger, commanded men during the Antelope Hills expedition, and later fought as a Confederate colonel. He led the Confederate forces in what was arguably the last engagement of the American Civil War, the Battle of Palmito Ranch on May 12–13, 1865. It was a Confederate victory, but as it occurred more than a month after Robert E. Lee's surrender, it did not affect the war's outcome.

== Early life ==
Ford was born in Greenville District, South Carolina, on May 26, 1815, and grew up in Lincoln County, Tennessee. His parents were William and Harriet Ford. When he was 16, he moved to Shelbyville, Tennessee, to study medicine. He met his wife, Mary Davis; however, the marriage ended in divorce. Ford then moved to Texas to fight for independence from Mexico.

== Texas ==
Ford arrived in Texas in June 1836, too late to participate in the Texas Revolution. He served in the Texas army until 1838. He opened a medical practice in the east Texas town of San Augustine, where he practiced for eight years. He also studied law and passed the bar exam before winning election to the Texas legislature in 1844, advocating annexation by the United States. The following year he moved to Austin where he purchased the Texas National Register, renaming it the Texas Democrat.

When the Mexican–American War began, Ford enlisted in John Coffee Hays' regiment of Texas Mounted Rifles. He was promptly appointed a lieutenant and served as an adjutant and medical officer. Ford saw active duty with his regiment in Mexico, commanding a scout company for part of the time. Ford received the nickname 'Rip' for his peculiar inclusion of "Rest in peace" after each name when composing his company's casualty lists.

In 1849, with Robert Neighbors, Ford explored the country between San Antonio and El Paso and published a report and map of the route, which became known as the Ford and Neighbors Trail. Later the same year, he was made captain in the Texas Rangers and was stationed between the Nueces River and the Rio Grande, where he had numerous fights with Native Americans during 1850 and 1851. In 1850, he captured the war chief Carne Muerto, a son of Santa Anna. After his Ranger unit was disbanded, Ford participated in Jose Maria Jesus Carbajal's Merchant's War (1851-1852) as a colonel.

In 1852, Ford was elected to the Texas Senate, bought the Southwestern American, and established the State Times in 1853, which he sold in 1857. Early in 1858, he accepted a commission as Senior Captain in the state troops and defeated hostile Native Americans in the Battle of Little Robe Creek on the Canadian River. Late in 1859, he was sent to the Rio Grande by Governor Hardin Richard Runnels at the head of 53 state troops (Texas Rangers), where he joined operations with Captain George Stoneman of the 2nd Cavalry and Captain Tobin's Texas Rangers against Juan Cortina in the Battle of Rio Grande City.

== American Civil War ==
In 1861, Ford served as a member of the Secession Convention and initiated a trade agreement between Mexico and the Confederate States of America. As a Confederate States Army colonel, Ford commanded the Rio Grande Military District. In early April 1861, Ford commanded troops who defended Zapata County from invaders from Mexico who did not want Texas in the Confederacy in the Second Cortina War. They had entered Zapata County from Mexico and hanged the county judge. Several invaders were killed, marking the first deaths in defense of the Confederacy, about two weeks before the bloodless Battle of Fort Sumter. Between 1862 and 1865, Ford ran the Bureau of Conscription of the State, and engaged in border operations protecting Confederate-Mexican trade. After raising 1,300 troops, "The Cavalry of the West", Ford recaptured Fort Brown on July 30, 1864. His forces attacked U.S. soldiers a few miles above Palmito Ranch on September 9, 1864, forcing them to retreat to Brazos Island on September 12, 1864. In May 1865, Ford led Confederate forces in the Battle of Palmito Ranch, by some criteria the last battle of the American Civil War.

"Some of the Sixty-Second Colored Regiment were also taken. They had been led to believe that if captured they would either be shot or returned to slavery. They were agreeably surprised when they were paroled and permitted to depart with the white prisoners. Several of the prisoners were from Austin and vicinity. They were assured they would be treated as prisoners of war. There was no disposition to visit upon them a mean spirit of revenge."-Colonel John Salmon Ford, May 1865.

When Ford surrendered his command following the battle at Palmito Ranch, he urged his men to honor their paroles. He insisted that "the negro had a right to vote".

== Post Civil War ==
Ford acted as a guide for the U.S. military operating against "cow-thieves and other disturbers of peace and quietude" and was a correspondent for the Galveston News. Later, he was assistant editor for the Brownsville Ranchero and wrote for the Brownsville Courier before establishing and publishing the Brownsville Sentinel. He died in San Antonio, on November 3, 1897, aged 82.

In 2008, Ford was inducted to the Texas Military Hall of Honor.

== See also ==
- List of American Civil War generals (Acting Confederate)
- List of mayors of Brownsville, Texas

Political offices
Preceded by W. P. DeNormandie	Mayor of Austin; 1854–1855	Succeeded by John T. Cleveland
Texas Senate
Preceded by Edward Burleson	Texas State Senator from District 21; 1852–1853	Succeeded by Elliott McNeil Millican
Preceded by Joseph E. Dwyer	Texas State Senator from District 29; 1876–1879	Succeeded by Stephen Powers
