= Army of Occupation (Mexico) =

United States army commanded by Zachary Taylor in the Mexican-American War

The Army of Occupation was the name of the U.S. Army commanded by Zachary Taylor during the Mexican–American War.

== Creation ==
On April 23, 1845, Brevet Brigadier General Zachary Taylor was appointed to command the 1st Military District along the Texas/Louisiana border. On April 27 Taylor received orders to move with a "Corps of Observation" to the Texas frontier. Taylor moved his forces to Corpus Christi and established a base there. While at Corpus Christi, Taylor named the forces assembled there the Army of Occupation.

== Operations on the Rio Grande ==
In May 1846, the army numbered 2,400 and was divided into two brigades. The 1st Brigade was commanded by Lt. Col. William G. Belknap and would be the right wing of the army. The 2nd Brigade was commanded by Colonel David E. Twiggs and was the left wing. Taylor defeated the Mexican army at the battles of Palo Alto and Resaca de la Palma.

Order of Battle

Brigade	Commander	Composition
1st Brigade (left wing)	Lt. Col. William G. Belknap	8th Infantry - Capt. William R. Montgomery; Light Battery A, 2nd U.S. Artillery - Capt. James Duncan; Artillery Battalion - Lt. Col. Thomas Childs
2nd Brigade (right wing)	Col. David E. Twiggs	3rd Infantry - Capt. Lewis N. Morris; 4th Infantry - Capt. George W. Allen; 5th Infantry - Lt. Col. James S. McIntosh; Light Battery C, 3rd U.S. Artillery - Capt. Samuel Ringgold; May's Squadron, 2nd Dragoons - Capt. Charles A. May; Ker's Squadron, 2nd Dragoons - Capt. Croghan Ker

== Monterrey ==
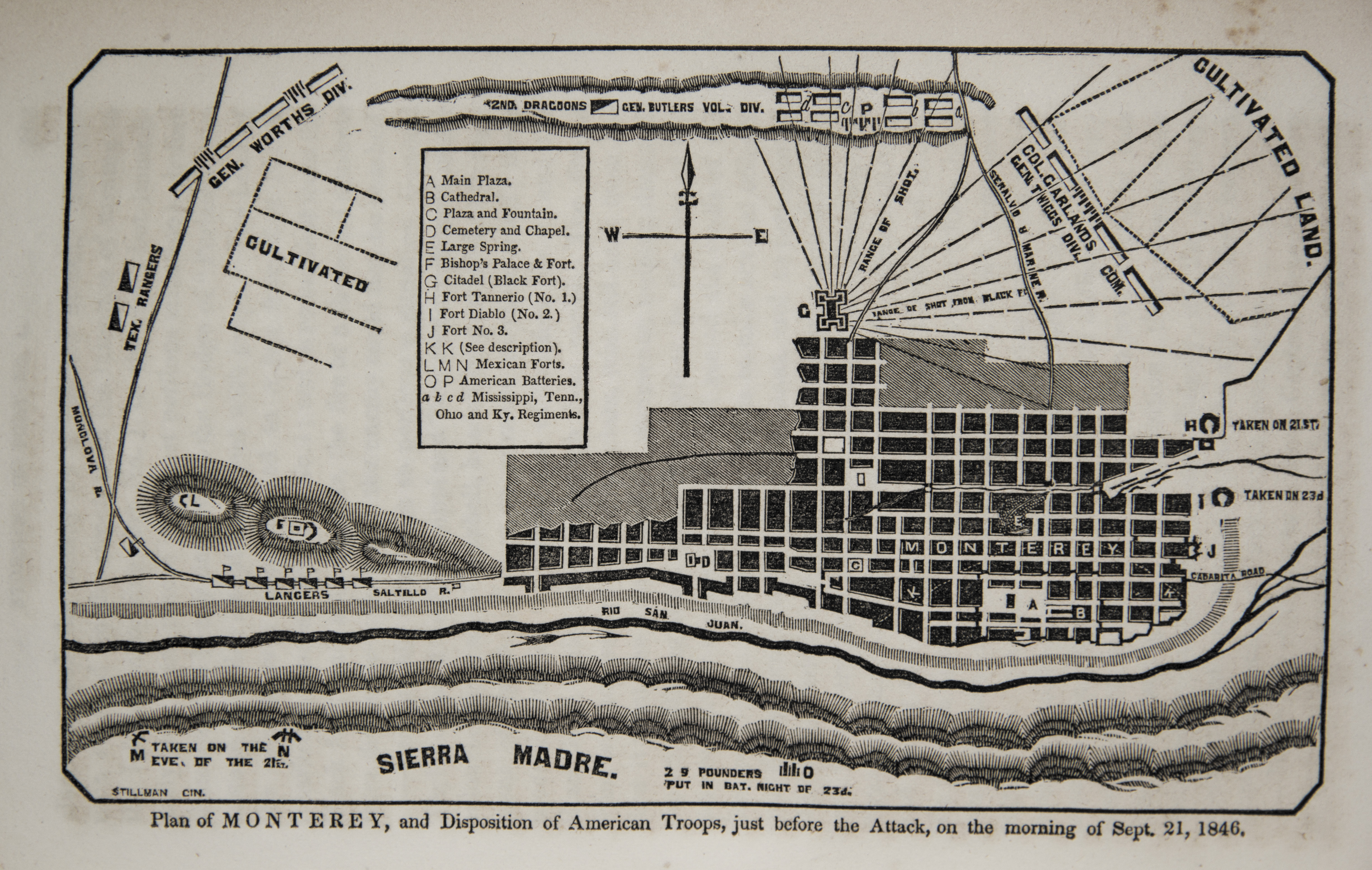
Plan of Monterey, and Disposition of American Troops, just before the Attack, on the morning of Sept. 21, 1846

Taylor received significant reinforcements for an invasion of northern Mexico. The Army of Occupation was organized into four divisions, two of them being made up mostly of volunteers and two of them mostly regulars. David Twiggs was given command of the 1st Division of Regulars and Brigadier General William J. Worth of the 2nd Division of Regulars. The 1st Division of Volunteers under the command of Kentucky native, General William O. Butler who also served as Taylor's second-in-command. The 2nd Division of Volunteers was placed under the command of General Robert Patterson. James Pinckney Henderson, governor of Texas and major general of Texas commanded the so-called "Texas Division" composed of two mounted regiments, one of them being the famous Texas Rangers under Col. John C. Hays. Patterson's 2nd Division was stationed at Camargo until he received orders directly from the Secretary of War to proceed to and occupy the coastal city of Tampico.

Taylor and the remaining three divisions along with Henderson's Texans, numbering around 6,000, moved into northern Mexico to fight the battle of Monterrey. The enlistments of several of the volunteer units ran out just prior to the battle. Many of the volunteers went home but several stayed and the remnant were formed into new units. Colonel Albert Sidney Johnston's regiment of Texas volunteers time ran out. A company was formed of Mississippi and Texas volunteers that volunteered to stay and Colonel Johnston was made inspector general to General Butler. A whole brigade of Louisiana volunteers' time had run out and all left except one company's worth of soldiers who stayed and called themselves the "Phoenix Company".

General Twiggs' Division was to lead the attack on Monterrey but prior to the battle he overdosed on his usual laxative and was forced to turn command over to Lt. Col. John Garland. During the fighting General Butler was wounded and forced to relinquish command to Brig. Gen. Thomas L. Hamer. Generals Worth and Henderson and Col. Jefferson Davis served as commissioners for the surrender of Monterrey and the army occupied the city for several months after. During this period of occupation General Hamer unexpectedly died from sickness.

Order of Battle at Monterrey

- Commander – Major General Zachary Taylor
  - Inspector General, U.S.A. - Colonel George Croghan

Unattached units

- Company C, 1st U.S. Artillery - Captain Lucien B. Webster

Division	Brigade	Regiments and Others
1st Regular Division; Brig. Gen. David E. Twiggs	1st Brigade Lt. Colonel John Garland	3rd Infantry - Major William W. Lear; 4th Infantry - Major George W. Allen; Mississippi & Texas Volunteers - Captain William R. Shivor; Company E, 3rd U.S. Artillery - Captain Braxton Bragg
1st Regular Division; Brig. Gen. David E. Twiggs	2nd Brigade Lt. Colonel Henry J. Wilson	1st Infantry - Major John J. Abercrombie; Baltimore & District of Columbia Battalion - Lt. Col. William H. Watson
1st Regular Division; Brig. Gen. David E. Twiggs	Unattached	Light Battery C, 3rd U.S. Artillery - 1st Lieutenant Randolph Ridgely; 2nd Dragoons - Lt. Colonel Charles A. May
2nd Regular Division; Brig. Gen. William J. Worth	1st Brigade Lt. Colonel Thomas Staniford	8th Infantry - Captain George Wright; Artillery Battalion (served as Infantry) - Lt. Colonel Thomas Childs; Light Battery A, 2nd U.S. Artillery - Captain James Duncan
2nd Regular Division; Brig. Gen. William J. Worth	2nd Brigade Colonel Persifor F. Smith	5th Infantry - Major Martin Scott; 7th Infantry - Major Dixon S. Miles; "Phoenix Company" Louisiana Volunteers - Captain Albert C. Blanchard; Light Battery K, 1st U.S. Artillery - Lt William W. Mackall
1st Volunteer Division; Maj. Gen. William O. Butler	1st Brigade Brig. Gen. Thomas L. Hamer	1st Ohio - Colonel Alexander M. Mitchell; 1st Kentucky - Colonel Stephen Ormsby
1st Volunteer Division; Maj. Gen. William O. Butler	2nd Brigade Brig. Gen. John A. Quitman	1st Tennessee - Colonel William B. Campbell; Mississippi Rifles - Colonel Jefferson Davis
Texas Division; Maj. Gen. J. Pinckney Henderson	not brigaded	1st Texas Mounted Rifles (Texas Rangers) - Col. John C. Hays; 2nd Texas Mounted Rifles - Colonel George T. Wood

Forces Stationed at Camargo

Division	Commander	Composition
2nd Division of Volunteers	Major General Robert Patterson	1st Brigade - Brig. Gen. Thomas Marshall; 2nd Brigade - Brig. Gen. Gideon Pillow

== Buena Vista ==
After capturing Monterrey most of the units in the Army of Occupation were transferred to Winfield Scott for the invasion of central Mexico and in October Henderson's Texans returned home. Taylor felt that the transfer of these forces was an attempt by his political rival President James K. Polk to deprive Taylor of any further military glory. Taylor decided instead to move south to Saltillo, Coahuila, where he diverted the Center Division under John E. Wool from its expedition against Chihuahua and ordered it to Saltillo. Together with the Center Division the Army of Occupation numbered 4,500 and Wool became second-in-command to Taylor. The army had only one organized brigade; the Indiana Brigade under General Joseph Lane composed of the 2nd and 3rd Indiana regiments. The rest of the army was made up of 4 volunteer infantry regiments, 2 volunteer cavalry regiments, 2 regiments of U.S. dragoons and 4 battalions of U.S. artillery, all reporting directly to generals Wool and Taylor. Antonio López de Santa Anna assembled an army of 25,000 and marched to destroy the Americans at Saltillo. Taylor met Santa Anna at the Battle of Buena Vista and although greatly outnumbered defeated the Mexicans.

Army of Occupation - Major General Zachary Taylor

Division	Brigade	Regiments and Others
Central Division; Brig. Gen. John E. Wool	Indiana Brigade Brig. Gen. Joseph Lane	2nd Indiana – Colonel William A. Bowles; 3rd Indiana – Colonel James H. Lane; Independent Battalion, 3rd Indiana – Major Willis A. Gorman (WIA)
Central Division; Brig. Gen. John E. Wool	Infantry	1st Illinois – Colonel John J. Hardin (KIA); 2nd Illinois – Colonel William H. Bissell; 2nd Kentucky – Colonel William R. McKee; Mississippi Rifles – Colonel Jefferson Davis (WIA); 1st Texas Rangers, detachment - Captain Benjamin McCulloch; Texas Company of Foot - Captain Patrick Edward Connor (WIA)
Central Division; Brig. Gen. John E. Wool	Cavalry	Arkansas Mounted Regiment – Colonel Archibald Yell (KIA); Kentucky Mounted Regiment – Colonel Humphrey Marshall; 1st Dragoons – Captain Enoch Steen (WIA); 2nd Dragoons – Lt. Colonel Charles A. May (WIA)
Central Division; Brig. Gen. John E. Wool	Artillery	Light Battery C, 3rd U.S. Artillery – Captain Braxton Bragg; Company E, 3rd U.S. Artillery - Captain Thomas W. Sherman; Company B, 4th U.S. Artillery – Captain John M. Washington

== Evacuation ==
In November 1847 Taylor left Mexico and returned to the United States. Command of the Army of Occupation was transferred to General Wool. Wool made plans for various campaigns in northern Mexico, but the war came to an end before he could undertake any significant campaign. Wool thus oversaw the evacuation of the army from Mexico. The evacuation was well underway by July 1848 when Wool requested to be relieved due to illness. On July 23, command of the Army of Occupation was transferred to Colonel William Davenport, who moved the remaining units of the army to Fort Brown along the Rio Grande.

== See also ==
- Army of the West (1846)

== Notes ==
The unit was temporarily attached to the Texas Division during the battle.
