= Battle of Palo Alto =

Major battle of the Mexican-American War

Coordinates: 26.02007°N 97.46538°W

- Part of the Texas Campaign of the Mexican–American War
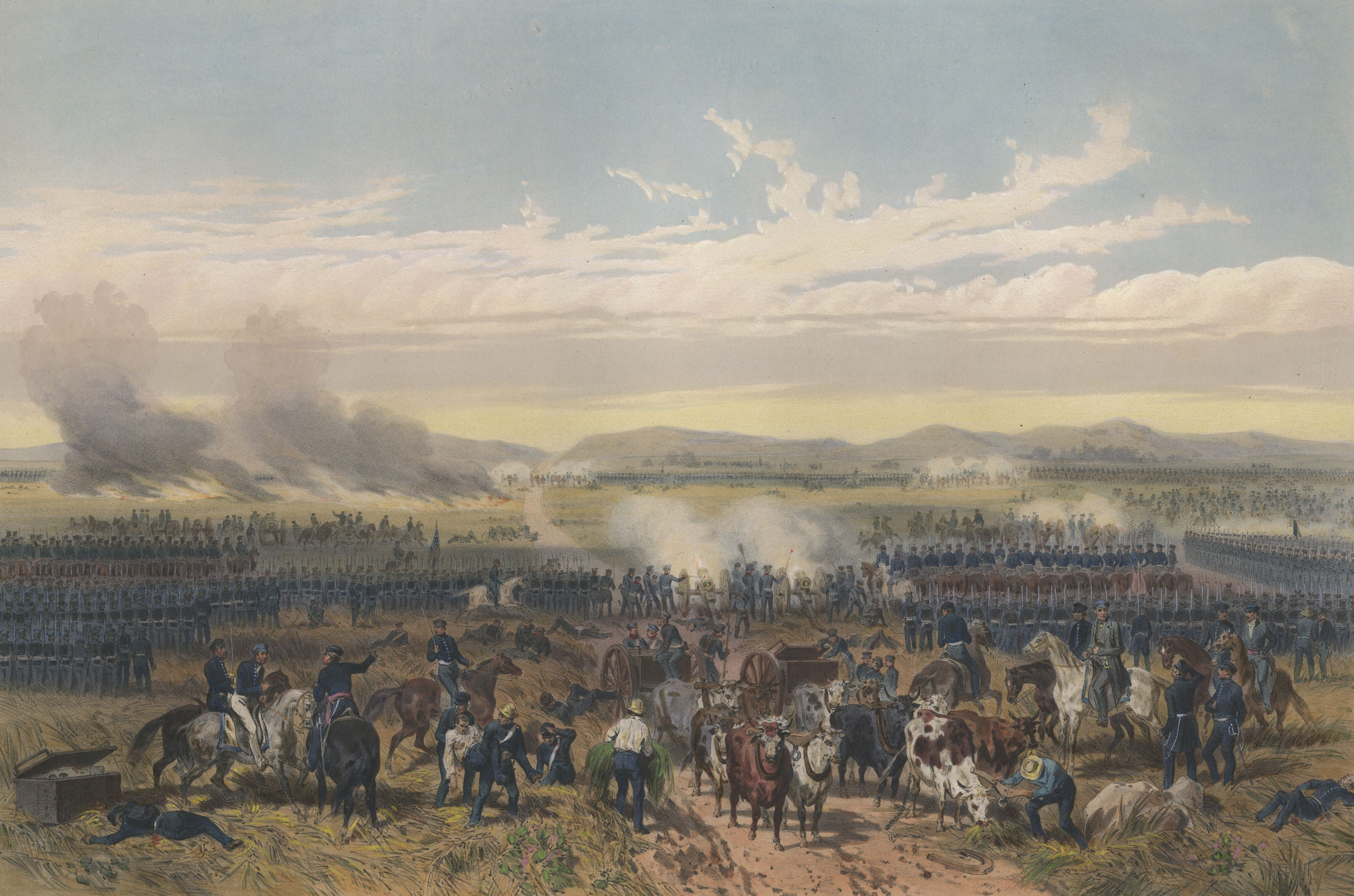
- Painting by Carl Nebel (Note: Painting is in error by depicting background mountains. The nearest in any direction are 240 miles away, near Monterrey, NL, MX.)
Date	May 8, 1846
Location	near Brownsville, Texas
Result	American victory: Retreat of Mexican Army south to near the Rio Grande; Set the stage for the Battle of Resaca de la Palma the following day

Belligerents
United States	Mexico

Commanders and leaders
(United States) Zachary Taylor	(Mexico) Mariano Arista

Strength
2,288; 8 artillery pieces	3,709; 12 artillery pieces

Casualties and losses
9 killed 47 wounded 2 missing	102 killed 129 wounded 26 missing

The Battle of Palo Alto (Spanish: Batalla de Palo Alto) was the first major battle of the Mexican–American War and was fought on May 8, 1846, on disputed ground five miles (8 km) from the modern-day city of Brownsville, Texas. A force of some 3,700 Mexican troops – most of the Army of The North – led by General Mariano Arista engaged a force of approximately 2,300 United States troops – the Army of Occupation led by General Zachary Taylor.

On April 30, following the Thornton Affair, Mexican General Mariano Arista's troops began to cross the Rio Grande. On May 3, the troops began to besiege the American outpost at Fort Texas. Taylor marched his Army of Occupation south to relieve the siege. Arista, upon learning of his approach, diverted many of his units away from the siege to meet Taylor's force. The battle took place on May 8, three days before the formal declaration of war on Mexico by the United States. Arista ordered two cavalry charges, first against the American right flank and later against the left. Both were unsuccessful. The American victory is widely attributed to superior artillery, as the U.S. "light" artillery was much more mobile and accurate than that of the Mexican forces.

That evening, Arista was forced to withdraw further south. The armies clashed again the next day at the Battle of Resaca de la Palma.

== Background ==
The Americans ended up ensconced at what came to be known as Fort Brown right across the Rio Grande from Matamoros. On April 24, Arista arrived at Matamoros, having sent General Anastasio Torrejon with a portion of the army across the river to a point a few miles up the river from Matamoros. His plan was to throw troops across the Rio Grande, above and below the positions occupied by the Americans, and advancing to Point Isabel: the base of Taylor’s supply line on the Atlantic Coast, cut off Taylor from his supply line forcing him into an engagement.

After having dispatched Torrejon, Arista marched with the remainder of the troops and twelve pieces of artillery to Longoreño about five leagues east down the river. Leaving Francisco Mejia with only a small garrison in command at Matamoros.

The crossing at Longoreño was long delayed due to a lack of boats thus reducing Arista’s element of surprise, but Taylor was already on to him. The fact that Torrejon had crossed the river and was already further up west was discovered when Captain Thornton and his dragoons who had been sent up the river, fell into an ambuscade and were captured, which came to be known as the Thornton Affair. Later Taylor received intelligence that Mexican forces were preparing to cross the river below his position and not believing that Arista would make a direct assault on his fortified camp, concluded that Point Isabel was the true target.

On May 1, Taylor left his camp well fortified and marched toward Point Isabel which he reached the following day. Meanwhile Arista was crossing the river with his army and received intelligence that Taylor was anticipating his moves. He then gave orders for the batteries at Matamoros to fire upon Fort Brown and sent Pedro de Ampudia with four guns to besiege it. The cannonade began at five in the morning on May 3. Meanwhile Arista united his forces with those of Torrejon and took up a position at Palo Alto east of Point Isabel and North of Fort Brown thus cutting off communications between Fort Brown and Point Isabel. Taylor and his troops however heard the shelling of Fort Brown and Captain Walker was sent with a small cavalry escort to make contact with Fort Brown. By making a very wide turn he evaded Arista and then hid his men in the chaparral making his way alone by night to Fort Brown only to discover that the American troops there were enduring the bombardment with little damage. By the morning of May 5, he was back at Point Isabel with this news.

Taylor now determined to go to the relief of the fort with supplies of ordnance and provisions and on the 7th now set off again for Matamoros with two thousand three hundred men. On May 8 at around noon Taylor’s forces crossed paths with Arista’s forces and both began to prepare for battle.

== Battle ==
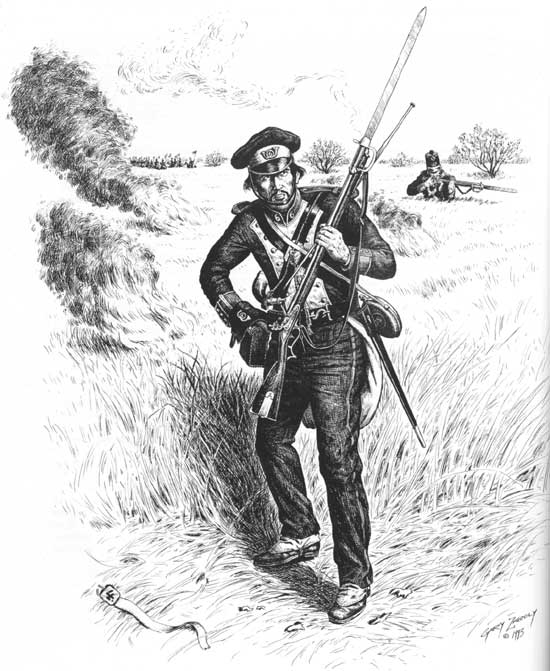
A Mexican soldier at Palo Alto

Facing north and moving left to right, General Arista's army consisted of General Antonio Canales Rosillo's 400 irregular cavalry in chaparral, Anastasio Torrejon's cavalry brigade consisting of the 8th, 7th and Light Cavalry, astride the Point Isabel road, then came General Jose Maria Garcia's brigade of the 4th and 10th Infantry with two 8-pounders, then General Rómulo Díaz de la Vega's brigade of the 10th and 6th Infantry with five 4-pounders, then the Tampico Corps, the 2d Light Infantry and a sapper battalion with a 4-pounder. Behind this line was Col. Cayetano Montero's light cavalry.

Facing south and moving right to left, Taylor, with a force of 2,300 men and 400 wagons, placed Col. David E. Twiggs with Lt. Col. James S. McIntosh's 5th Infantry and Maj. Samuel Ringgold's artillery battery, followed by Capt. Lewis N. Morris' 3d Infantry with Lt. William H. Churchill's two 18-pounders astride the road, followed by Capt. George W. Allen's 4th Infantry, Lt. Thomas Childs' artillery battalion, Lt. Col. William G. Belknap's wing, James Duncan's battery, then Capt. William R. Montgomery's 8th Infantry on the American left. Lt. Col. Charles A. May's dragoon squadron guarded the left flank and Capt. Croghan Ker guarded the train. Montgomery was slightly wounded during the battle, along with approximately ten other officers, some of them severely.

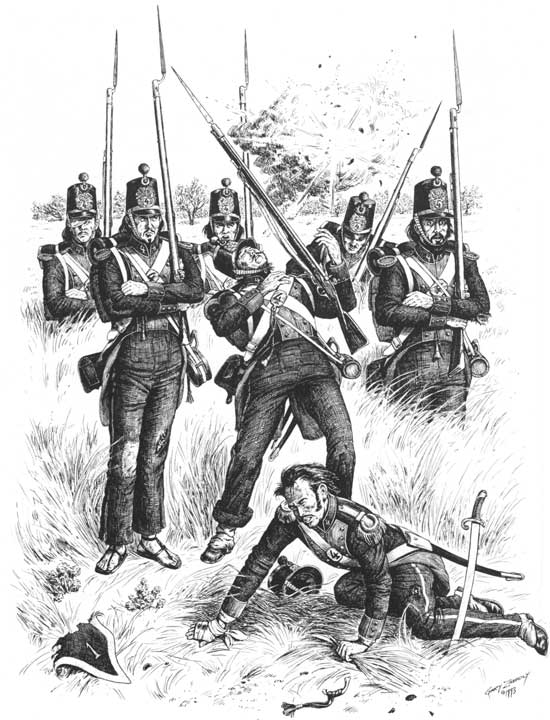
Mexican infantry under US artillery fire

Taylor halted his columns and formed a line behind his batteries when the Mexican artillery started firing at 2 pm central daylight time. The American artillery was very effective while the Mexican artillery often fell short. Arista ordered Torrejon's cavalry to attack the American right, but progress was slow, allowing Twiggs to form the 5th Infantry into a square to meet them with a couple of volleys.

A fire started from a cannon burning wad which halted fighting for an hour as the smoke paralleled between the lines of the opposing forces. Arista pulled back 1,000 yards on his left and Taylor advanced accordingly, rotating the axis of the battle 40 degrees counterclockwise. May failed to turn the Mexican left before the artillery duel resumed. Child's artillery battalion formed a square to repel another Torrejon cavalry charge. Duncan's battery stopped Arista from turning the American left and then advanced with the 8th Infantry and Ker's dragoons to drive the Mexican right from the field. A charge ordered by Arista at this time resulted in the light cavalry fleeing along the Mexican line, taking the 6th Infantry with them. Fighting stopped with dusk and both armies camped for the night.

== Aftermath ==
The morning of the 9th revealed the Mexican army slowly moving south. Taylor sent forward a 220-man battalion under McCall to reconnoiter the Mexican positions. The Battle of Resaca de la Palma would follow.

Major Ringgold was struck by a cannon ball and mortally wounded during the battle. But Ringgold's and Duncan's effective cannoneers with their "Flying Artillery"—the tactic of using light artillery to attack then quickly move to another location and fire once more—carried the day and won the battle for the Americans. General Zachary Taylor emerged from the war a national hero.

The battlefield is now Palo Alto Battlefield National Historical Park and is maintained by the National Park Service.

The State of Iowa named its counties soon after the battle, and several Iowa counties are named in honor of the battle and its participants, including Palo Alto, Ringgold, Page, and Taylor. The city of Palo, Iowa, was also named for the battle.

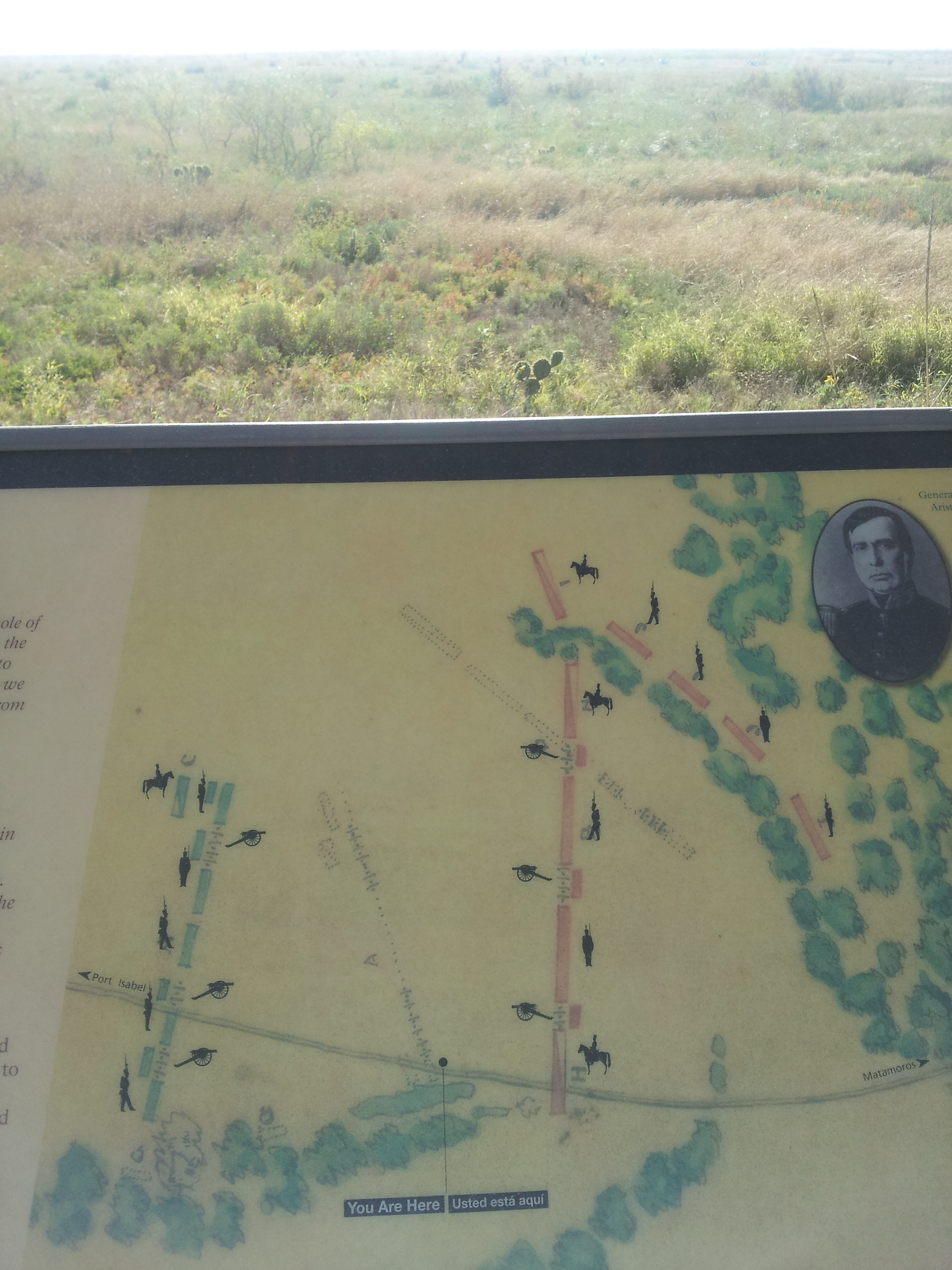
Battle of Palo Alto site

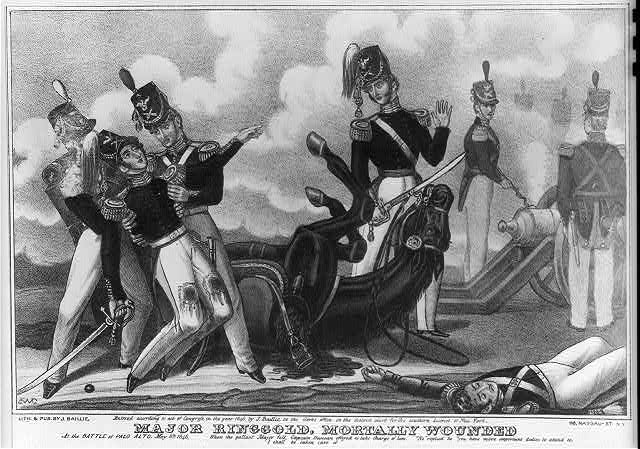
Engraving memorializing the fatal wounding of Maj. Samuel Ringgold in the battle

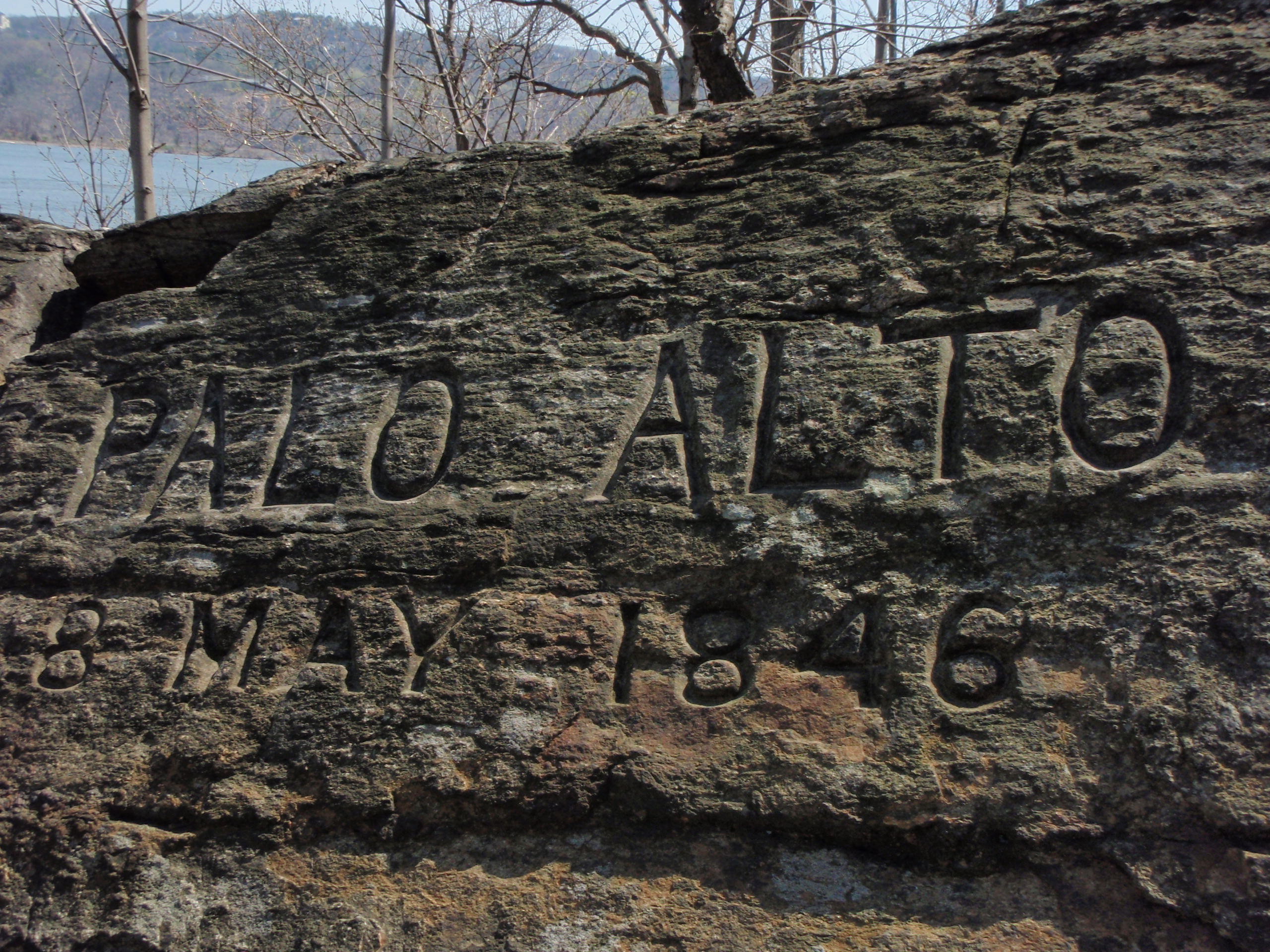
Monument to the Battle of Palo Alto at West Point

== Order of battle ==
=== Mexican ===
Army of the North – Gen.div. Mariano Arista

- Deputy – Gen.br. Pedro Ampudia

Infantry

- 1st Brigade – Gen. Jose M. Garcia
  - 10th Line – Col. Jose M. Garcia, Bn.Comdte. Manuel Montero
  - Artillery battery (2x 8-lb)
- 2nd Brigade - Gen. Rómulo Díaz de la Vega
  - 1st Line – Col. Nicolas Mendoza
  - 6th Line – Lt. Col. F. Garcia Casanova
  - Artillery battery (6x 4-lb)
- Brigade – Gen. Pedro Ampudia
  - 4th Line – Col. Jose Lopez Uraga
  - Villas of the North Cavalry Auxiliary
  - Sappers Company
  - Artillery battery (2x 6-lb ?)
- Unassigned
  - 2nd Light – Col. Jose Maria Carrasco, Lt.Col. M. Fernandez
  - Tampico Coast Guards Battalion – Lt. Col. Ramon Tabera
  - Zapadores (Sappers) Battalion – Lt. Col. Mariano Reyes

Cavalry

- Cavalry Brigade – Acting Gen. Anastasio Torrejon
  - 7th & 8th Line – Col. A. Torrejon?
  - Light Regiment of Mexico – Col. C. Montero
  - Presidential Companies – Col. Sabariego
- Artillery battery (2x 4-lb guns)
- Irregular Cavalry (Rancheros) – Gen.br. A. Canales

Artillery – Gen. Tomas Requena

- Chief of div. Raphael Linarte
  - Artillery battery (2x 8-lb, 2x 6-lb)
  - Artillery battery (4x 4-lb) – Capt. Ballarta?
  - Artillery battery (4x 4-lb)

=== American ===
Army of Occupation – Brig. Gen. Zachary Taylor

1st Brigade "Left Wing" – Lt. Col. William G. Belknap

- Artillery Battalion (acting as Infantry) – Lt. Col. Thomas Childs
- Light Battery A, 2nd U.S. Artillery – Capt. James Duncan
- 8th Infantry – Capt. William R. Montgomery
- Wagon Train – Capts. George H. Crosman & Abraham C. Myers

2nd Brigade "Right Wing" – Colonel David E. Twiggs

- 5th Infantry – Lt. Col. James S. McIntosh
- Light Battery C, 3rd U.S. Artillery – Samuel Ringgold (mw)
- 3rd Infantry – Capt. Lewis M. Morris
- Battery I, 3rd U.S. Artillery (2x 18-pounder siege guns) – Lt. William H. Churchill
- 4th Infantry – Maj. George W. Allen
- 2nd Dragoons – Capts. Croghan Ker & Charles A. May

== Fort Polk ==
Zachary Taylor established Fort Polk, (Note: Not to be confused with Fort Polk in Louisiana) near Point Isabel, 23 miles northeast of present day Brownsville, with a Gulf of Mexico pass suitable for ships' landings, on March 24, 1846, as a supply base for his operations leading up to the Battle of Palo Alto, and used it until 1850. He garrisoned it with two artillery companies under Major John Munroe. Major Charles Thomas was the Depot Quartermaster using wagons and river steamers to supply Taylor.

Taylor established camps for those heeding his call for volunteers at Point Isabel, the north end of Brazos Island, and along the Rio Grande between Barita and Fort Brown, at a place known as Camp Belknap.

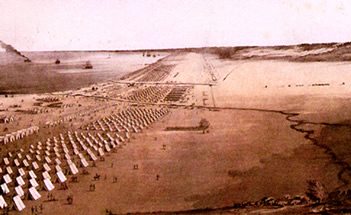
Taylor's three brigades camped at Corpus Christi along the Nueces River in 1845 before the march south to the Rio Grande.

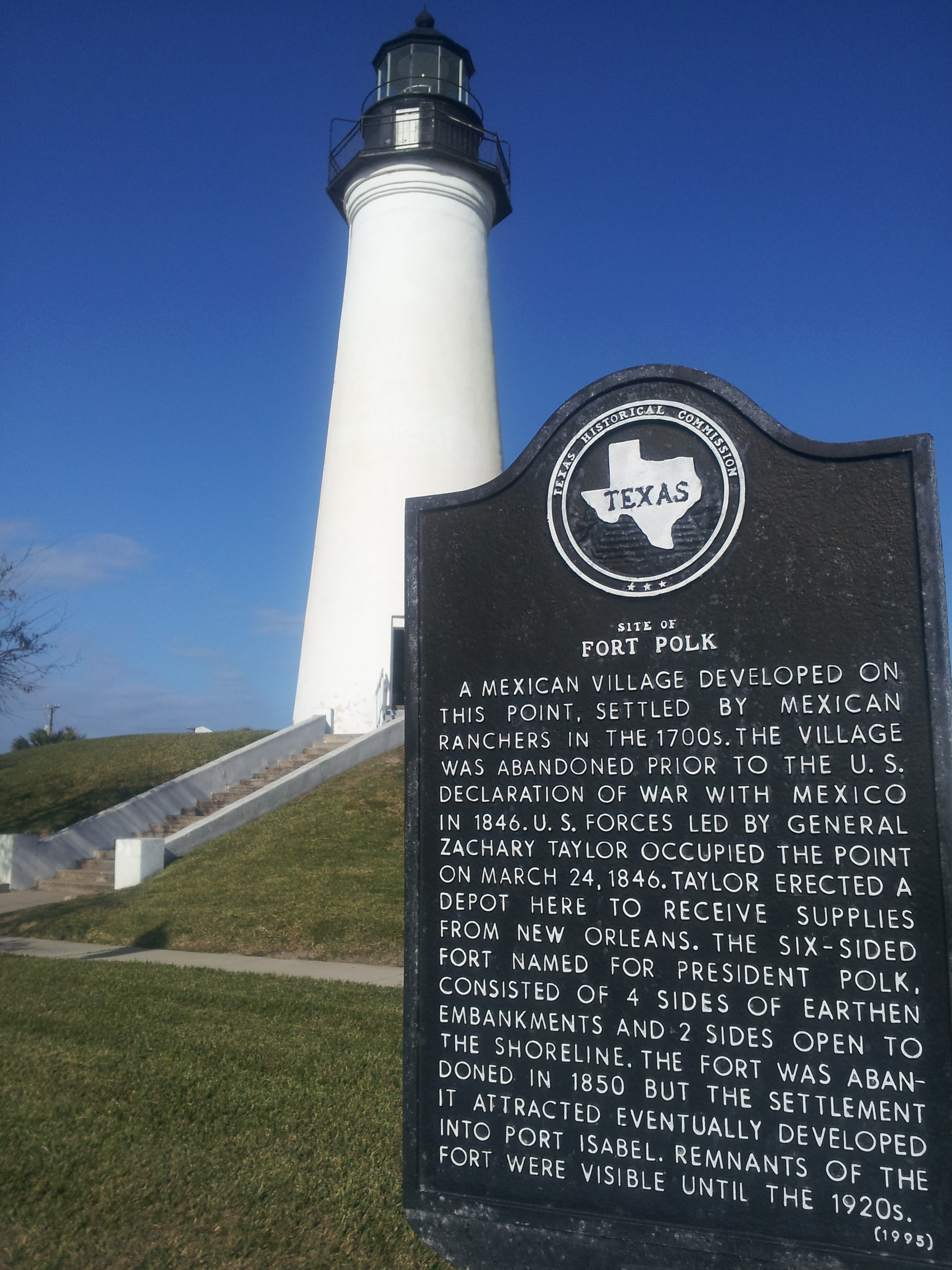
Point Isabel, the site of Taylor's supply base

== Gallery ==
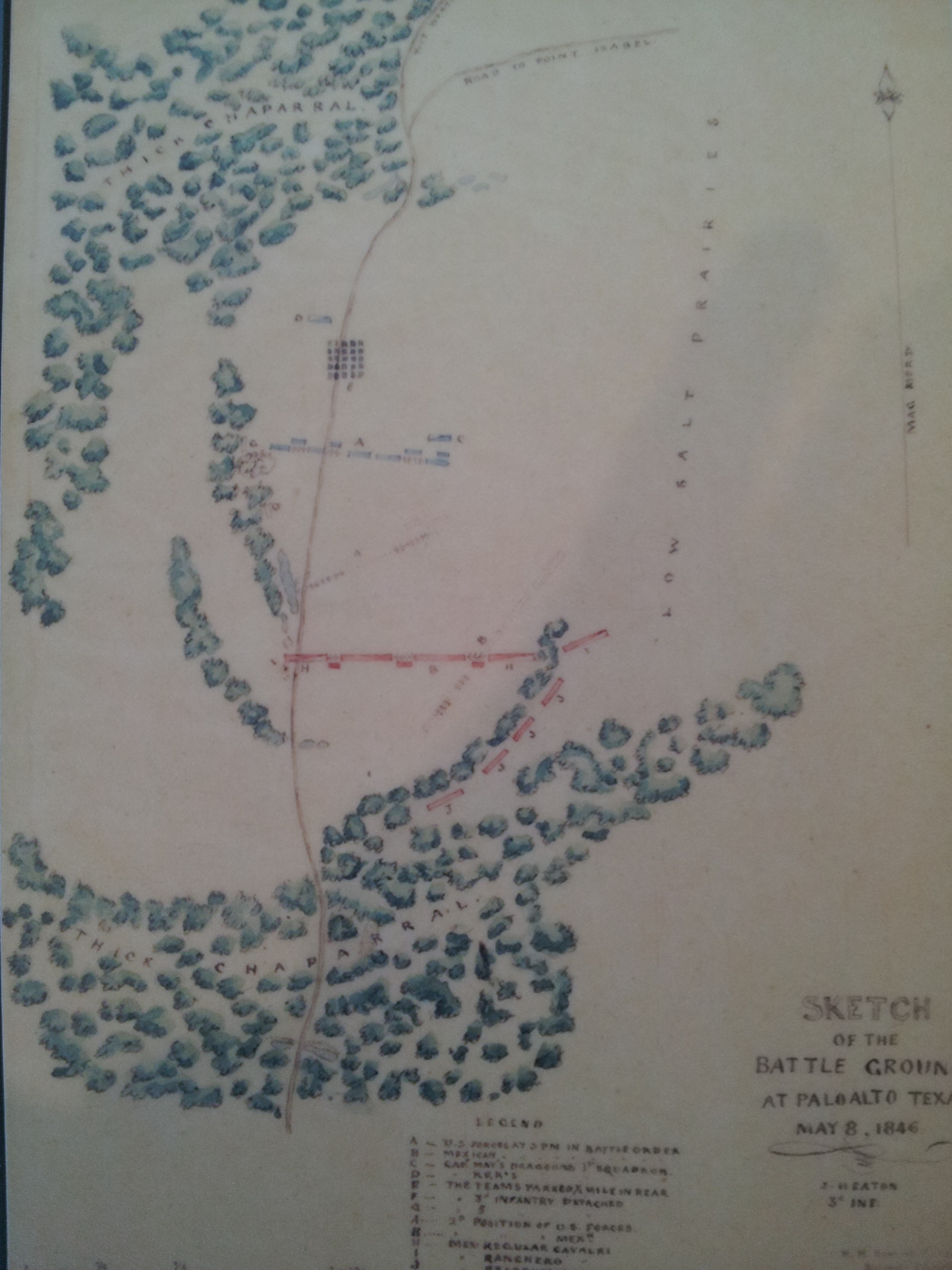
Period map of the battle

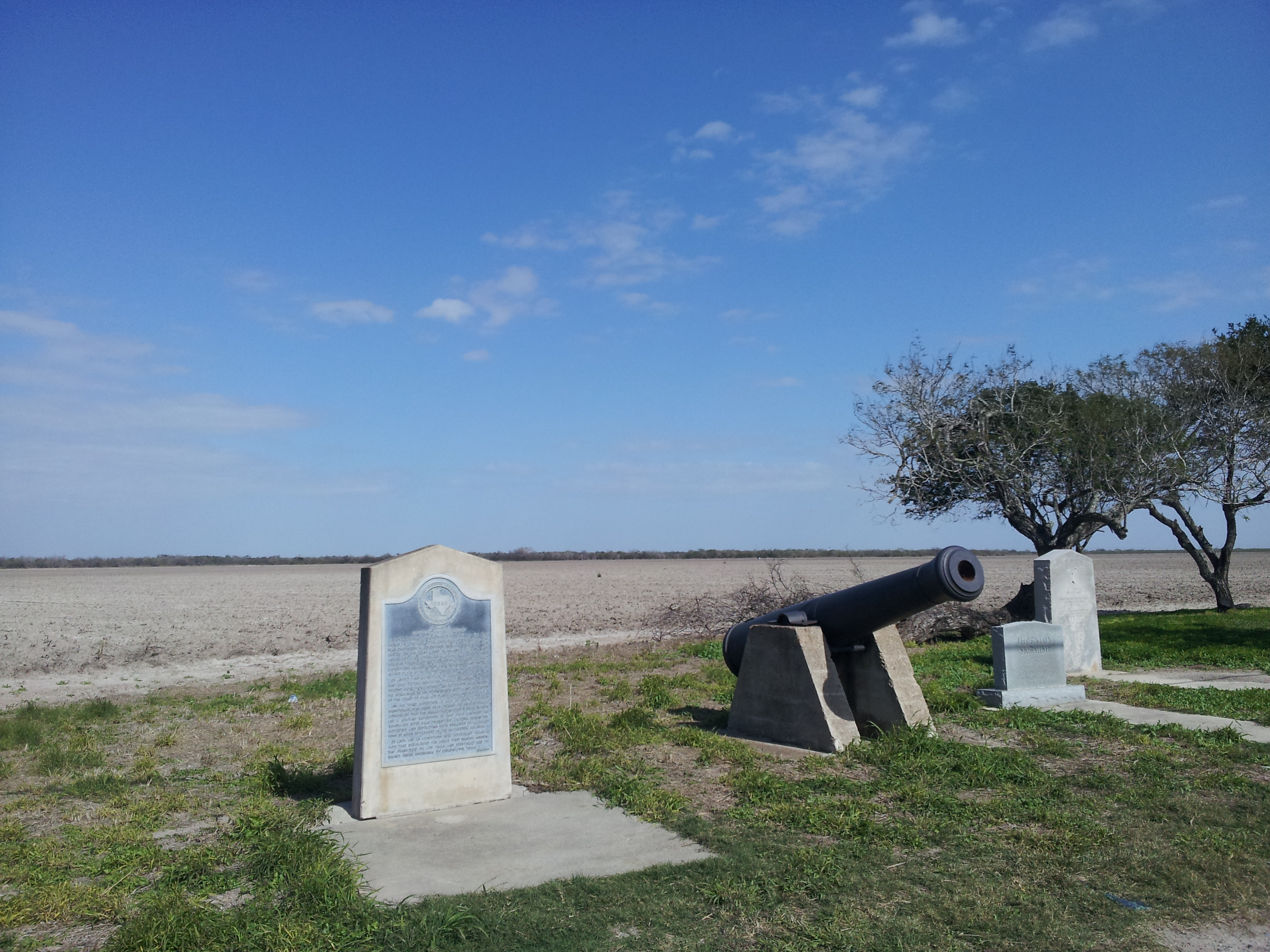
Rancho de Carricitos, the site of the Thornton Affair

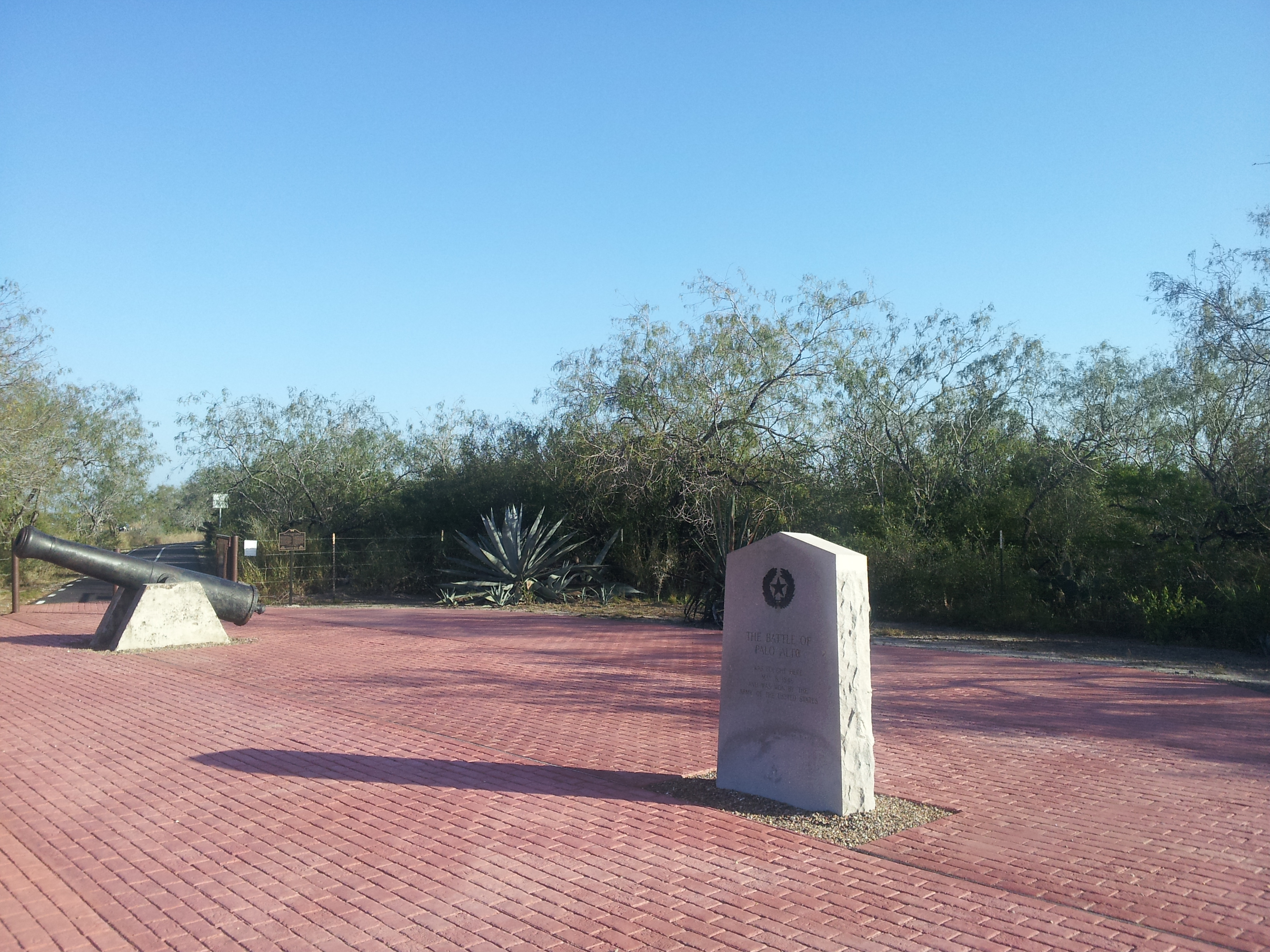
Texas historical marker

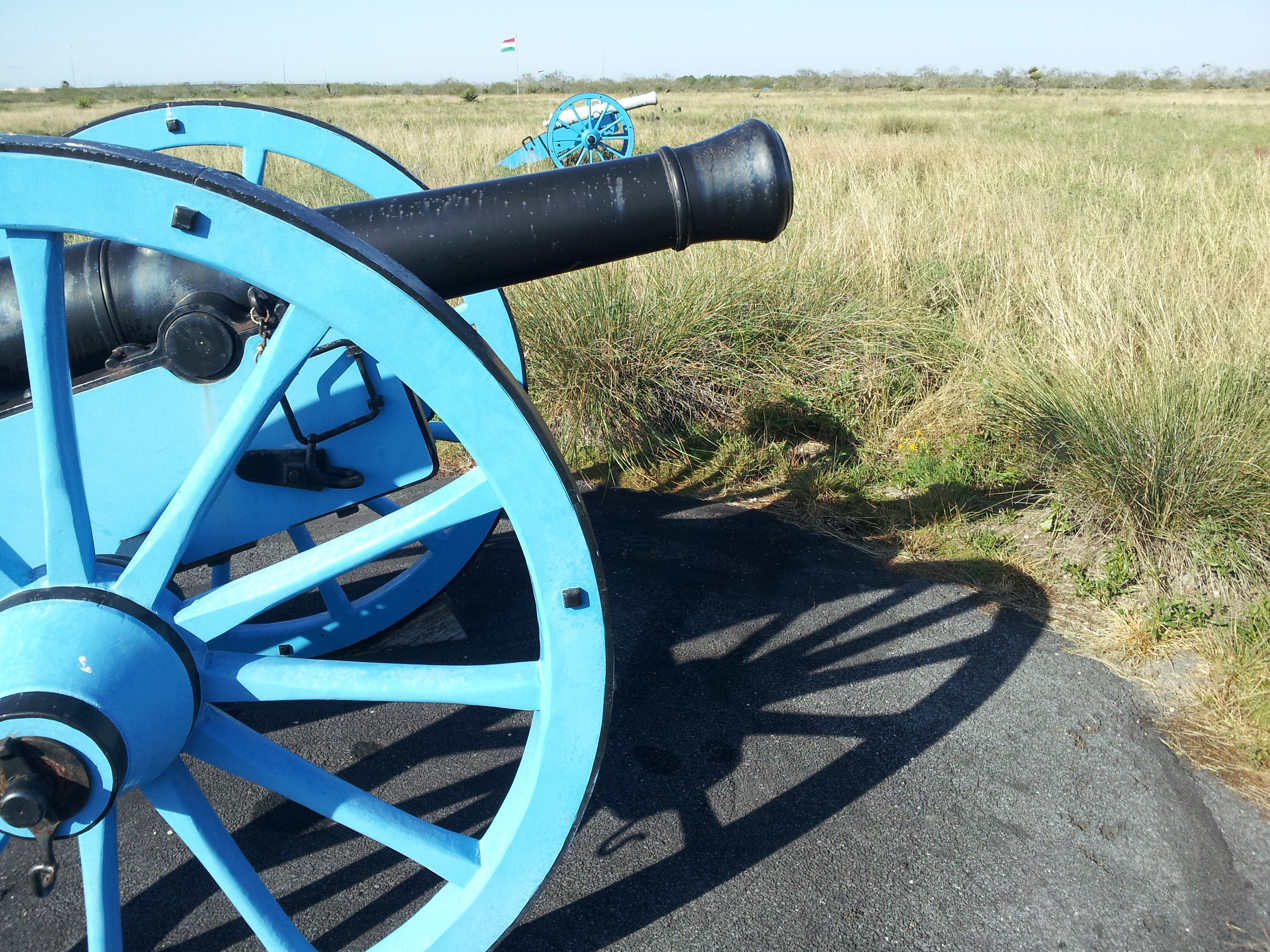
Mexican cannon

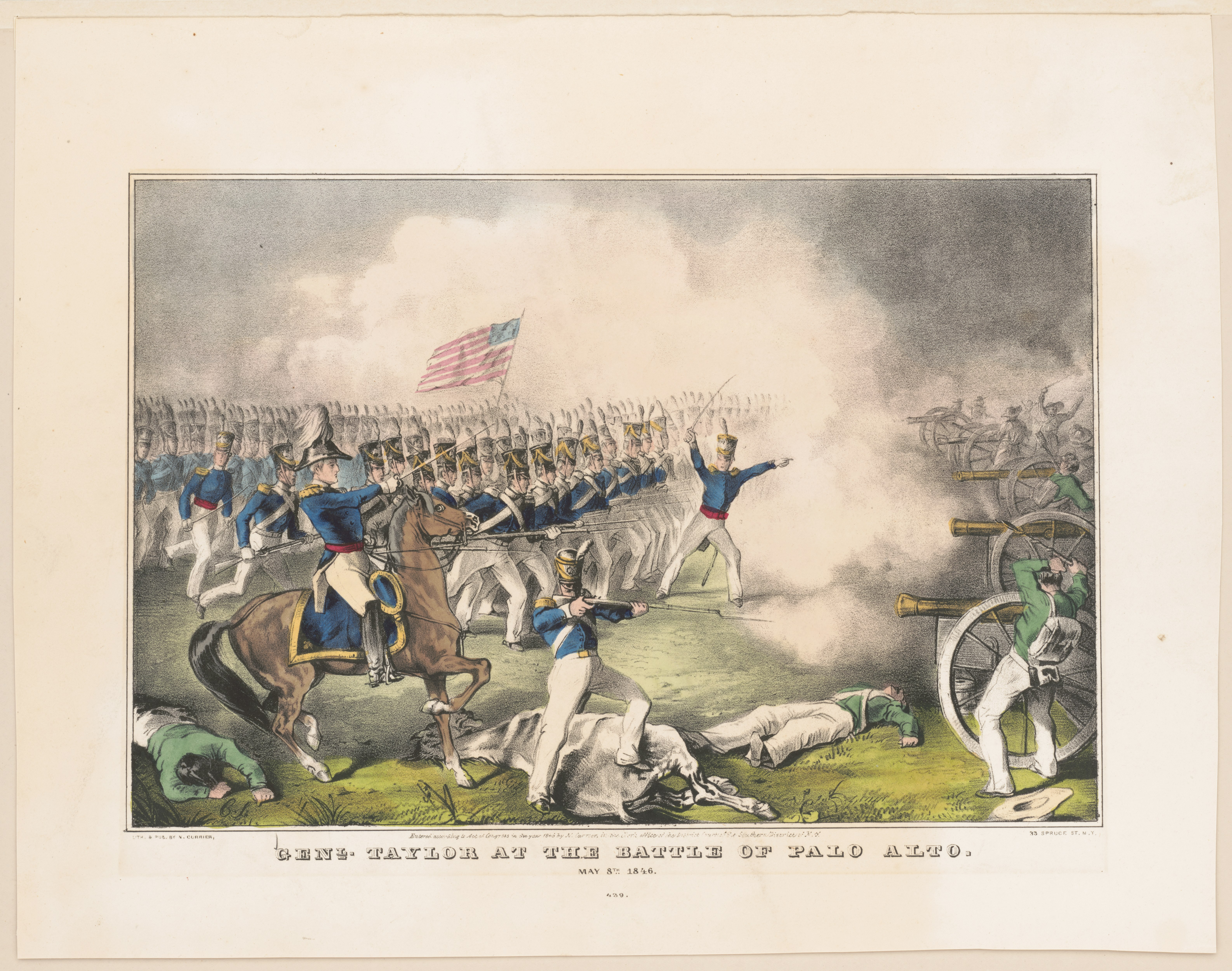
Painting of the battle

== See also ==
- Battles of the Mexican–American War
- List of conflicts in the United States
- Hispanic Heritage Sites (U.S. National Park Service)
- Saint Patrick's Battalion

== Bibliography ==
- Bauer, Karl Jack (1974). The Mexican War, 1846–1848. New York: Macmillan. ISBN 978-0-8032-6107-5.
- Frost, John (1848). The Mexican War and Its Warriors. H. Mansfield. (eBook)
- Tucker, Spencer C., ed. (2013). The Encyclopedia of the Mexican-American War: A Political, Social, and Military History. Vol. 1. Santa Barbara, California: ABC-CLIO. ISBN 978-1-85109-853-8.
- Montgomery, Henry (1847). The life of Major General Zachary Taylor. Aubura, J. C. Derby & co.
- "Palo Alto Battlefield". National Park Service. 2017.
- "Battle of Palo Alto". A&E Television Networks: History.com. 2017.

Additional Reading

- Chartrand, René. "Santa Anna's Mexican Army, 1821–1848"
- Crawford, Mark. "Encyclopedia of the Mexican-American War"
- Haecker, Charles M. (1997). On the Prairie of Palo Alto. Texas A&M University Press. ISBN 978-0890967584.
- Brooks, Nathan C. (2009). A Complete History of The Mexican War. Applewood Books (664 pages). ISBN 978-1429021005.
- Robarts, William Hugh (1887). Mexican War Veterans: A Complete Roster of the Regular and Volunteer Troops in the War Between the United States and Mexico, from 1846 to 1848. Brentano's.
