= Texas Campaign =

- Part of the Mexican–American War
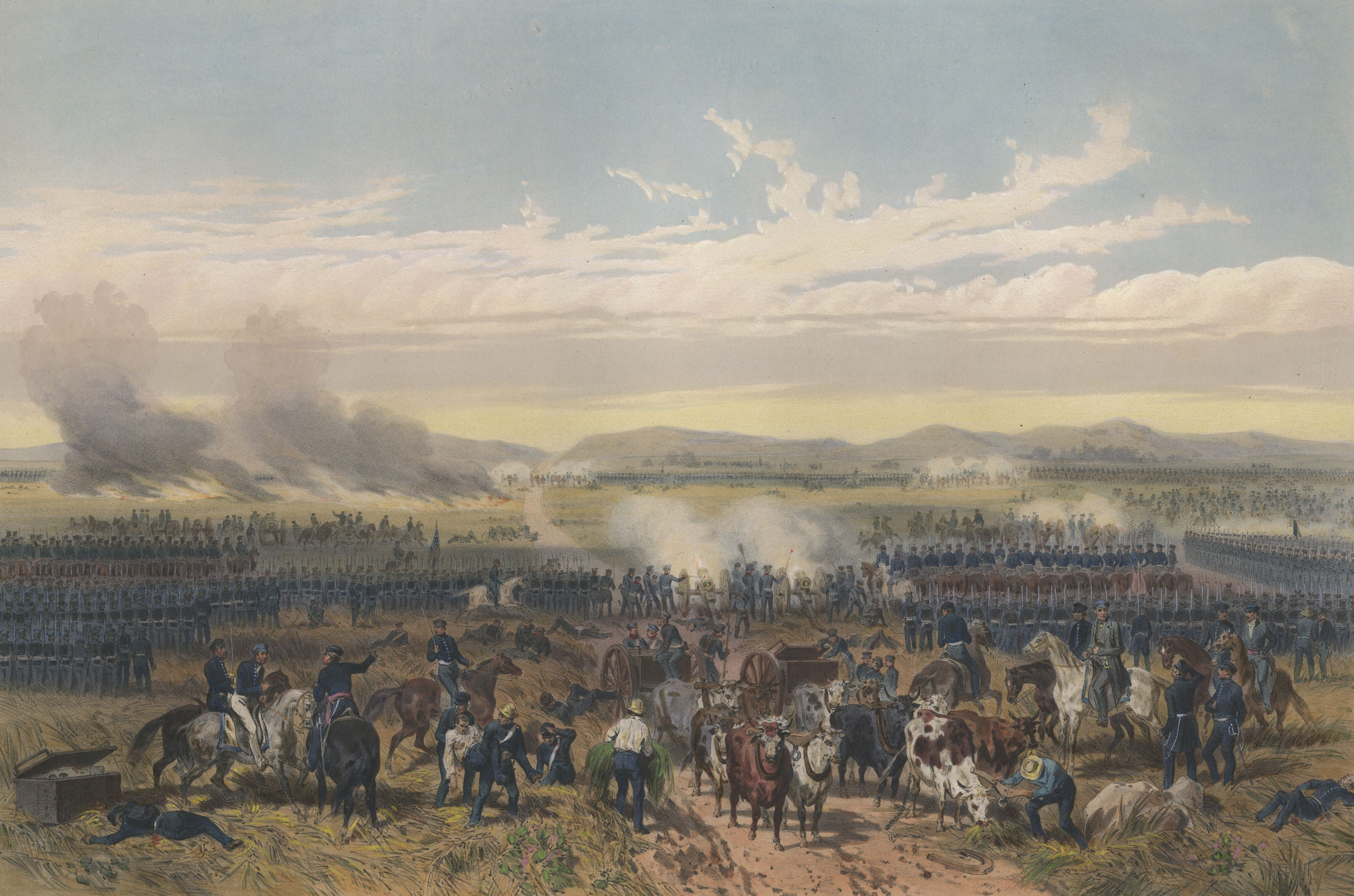
- The Battle of Palo Alto
Date	25 April – 9 May 1846
Location	Texas, United States
Result	American victory

Belligerents
United States	Mexico

Commanders and leaders
(United States) Zachary Taylor (United States) Seth Thornton (POW) (United States) Earl Van Dorn (United States) William Hardee (POW) (United States) Jacob Brown (DOW)	(Mexico) Mariano Arista (Mexico) Anastasio Torrejón; Francisco Mejía; Pedro de Ampudia

Strength
2,400 (May); 8 artillery pieces	4,000 (May); 12 artillery pieces

Casualties and losses
Total: 272; 58 killed 153 wounded 59 captured 2 missing	Total: 779; 258 killed 336 wounded 3 captured 182 missing

The Texas Campaign was the first front in the Mexican–American War, fought between the United States and Mexico. The front started with a Mexican assault near Brownsville. US forces were forced to surrender after hours of resisting, which led President James K. Polk to declare war on Mexico. After the United States defeated a larger Mexican Army at Palo Alto and Resaca de la Palma, Mexican Forces led by Mariano Arista retreated out of Texas.

== See also ==
- Attacks on the United States
