= Resaca de la Palma Battlefield =

- U.S. National Register of Historic Places
- U.S. National Historic Landmark
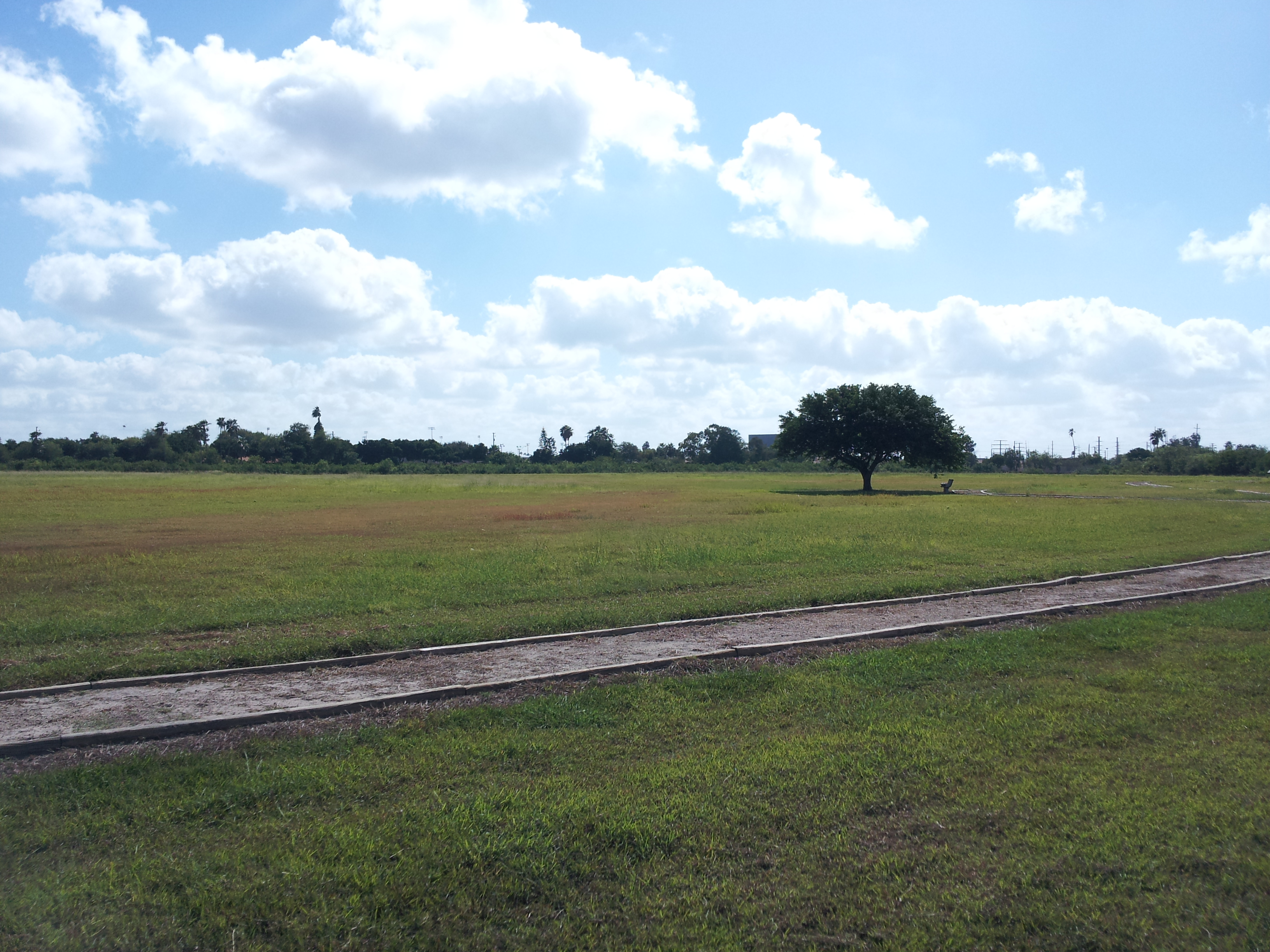
- Resaca De La Palma Battlefield in 2012

- Location within Texas Location within the United States
- Location: N edge of Brownsville on Parades Line Rd., Brownsville, Texas
- Coordinates: 25°56′15″N 97°29′10″W
- Area: 50 acres (20 ha)
- NRHP reference No.: 66000813

Significant dates
- Added to NRHP: October 15, 1966
- Designated NHL: December 19, 1960

The Resaca de la Palma Battlefield is the site in Brownsville, Texas, where American forces under General Zachary Taylor engaged Mexican forces under General Mariano Arista on May 9, 1846 in the Battle of Resaca de la Palma. A surviving undeveloped portion of the battlefield is now part of the Palo Alto Battlefield National Historical Park, and was designated a National Historic Landmark in 1960.

== Description ==
The Resaca de la Palma Battlefield is a separate unit of the Palo Alto Battlefield National Historical Park, located in northern Brownsville on the east side of Paredes Line Road north of East Price Road. The battlefield occupies a bend the Resaca de la Palma, an oxbow-like body of water that is part of the delta of the Rio Grande. The site is minimally developed, with a small parking area, walking trail, and interpretive signage.

The Battle of Palo Alto, fought on May 8, 1846, was the first major battle of the Mexican-American War, and was an American victory. The Mexican forces of General Arista retreated to this point, where they established a defensive position on the north side of the resaca on May 9. They occupied an area densely overgrown by chaparral, near a bridge crossing at which they established their main artillery position. The American forces, who were in pursuit, launched a full-scale assault on the position, and drove the Mexicans across the resaca, capturing General Arista's command post and very nearly the general as well.

The widely scattered battlefield has been broadly affected by subsequent land development. At the time of the site's National Historic Landmark designation in 1960, only a 50-acre (20 ha) fragment was relatively unscathed, having been used as a citrus orchard and polo field. The Resaca De La Palma itself was at one time filled in, but the channel has subsequently been reestablished.

A 34.4-acre (13.9 ha) subsection of that battlefield portion was put on the market for development in 2002. The National Park Service worked on proposals to preserve the remaining portions of the site and include it as part of Palo Alto Battlefield National Historical Park. House resolutions were presented by Solomon Ortiz in 2008 and again in 2009 to make this law. The resolution was added to the Omnibus Public Land Management Act of 2009, which passed March 19, 2009. The NPS acquired the site from the Brownsville Community Foundation in early August 2011.

== See also ==
- List of National Historic Landmarks in Texas
- National Register of Historic Places listings in Cameron County, Texas
