= Thomas Childs =

United States Army general

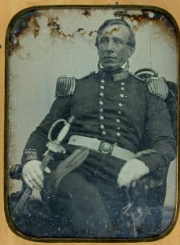
Thomas Childs circa. 1846 by Southworth & Hawes, Boston

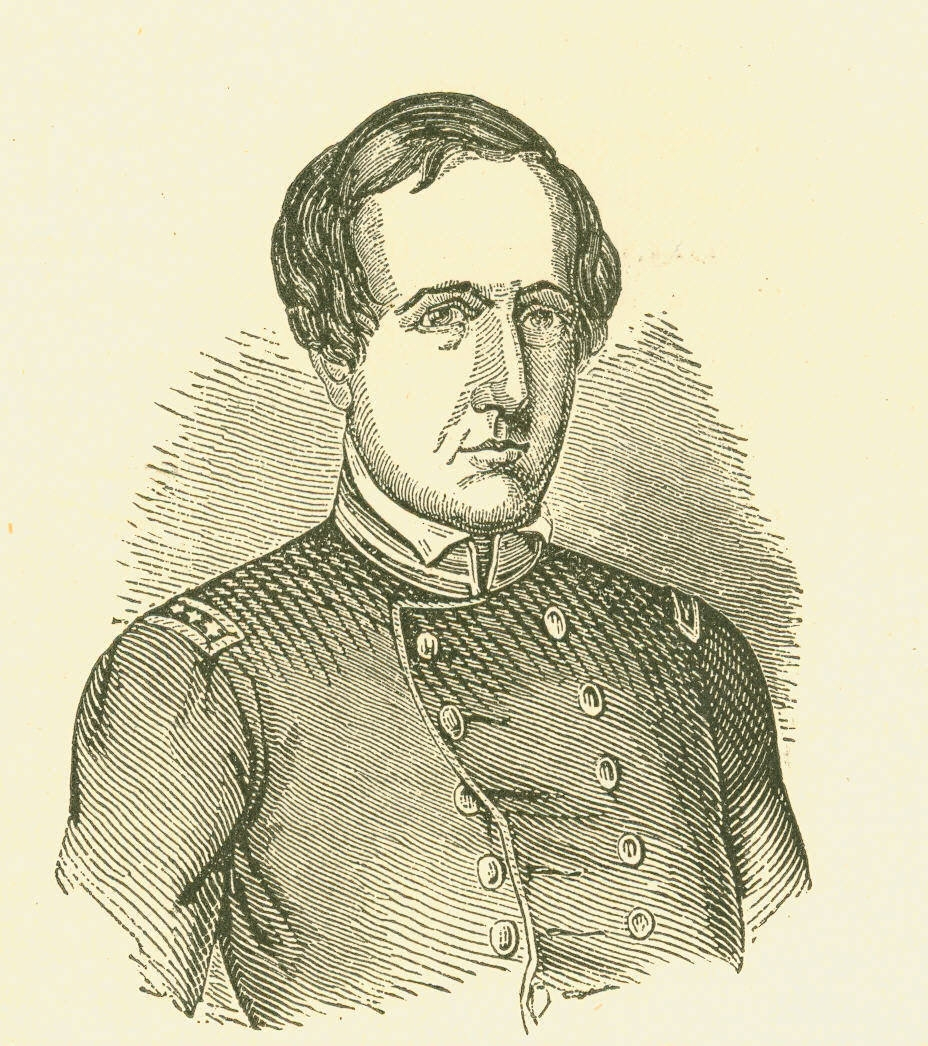
An illustration of Childs

Thomas Childs (16 March 1796 – 8 October 1853) was a U.S. soldier who served with distinction during the Mexican–American War.

Childs was born in Pittsfield, Massachusetts, the son and grandson of Revolutionary War veterans. He graduated from West Point in 1814 and fought in the Niagara campaign during the War of 1812 as an officer of artillery.

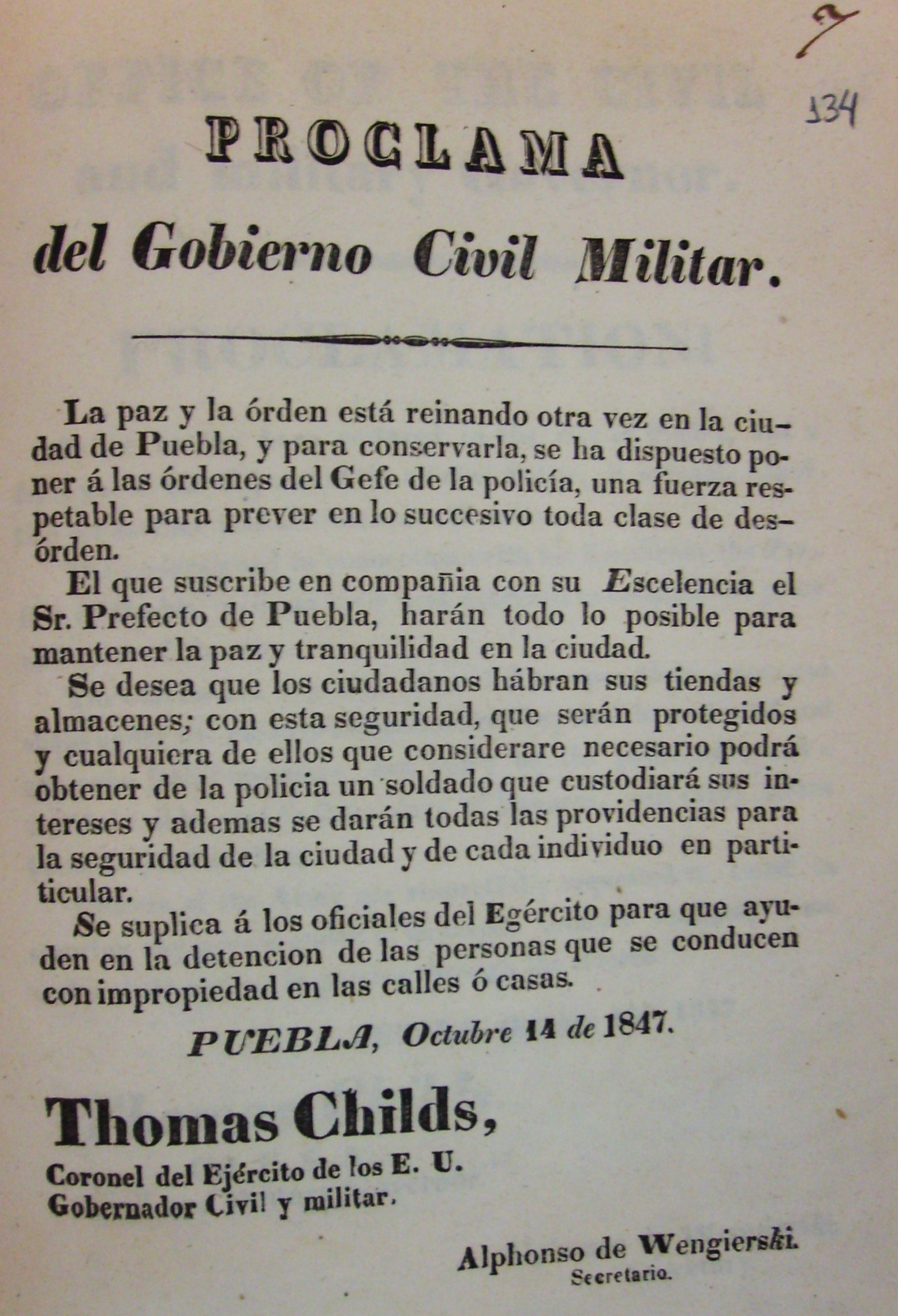

He was later sent to Florida where he fought against Indians during the Seminole Wars. For his distinguished services there he received a brevet promotion of lieutenant colonel in 1841.

Sent to Texas, he took command of an artillery battalion which he commanded at the battles of Palo Alto and Resaca de la Palma. He received a brevet to colonel for these two battles. At the battle of Monterrey, General William J. Worth placed Childs in charge of an attacking column composed of infantry and artillery. He successfully attacked the Bishop's Palace on the western end of the city. He transferred to Winfield Scott's army with the rest of the division and was Worth's chief-of-staff during the Siege of Veracruz. After the Battle of Cerro Gordo General Scott appointed Childs military governor of Jalapa and once Scott moved into the Valley of Mexico Childs was then appointed military governor of Puebla. He held this post during the battles for Mexico City. The day before Mexico City surrendered, Childs' garrison at Puebla came under siege. During the following siege of Puebla Childs repeatedly refused to surrender and was able to successfully repulse the Mexican attacks until a relief force under General Joseph Lane arrived and defeated the besiegers. For his defense of the city Childs was brevetted to brigadier general.

After the war Childs was placed in command of Fort McHenry in Baltimore Harbor. He was then placed in charge of military operations in Florida. He died in his headquarters at Fort Brooke, and was buried at St. Paul's Cemetery in Alexandria, Virginia.
