= Battle of Resaca de la Palma =

1846 battle of the Mexican–American War

Coordinates: 25.9374°N 97.4862°W

- Part of the Texas Campaign of the Mexican–American War
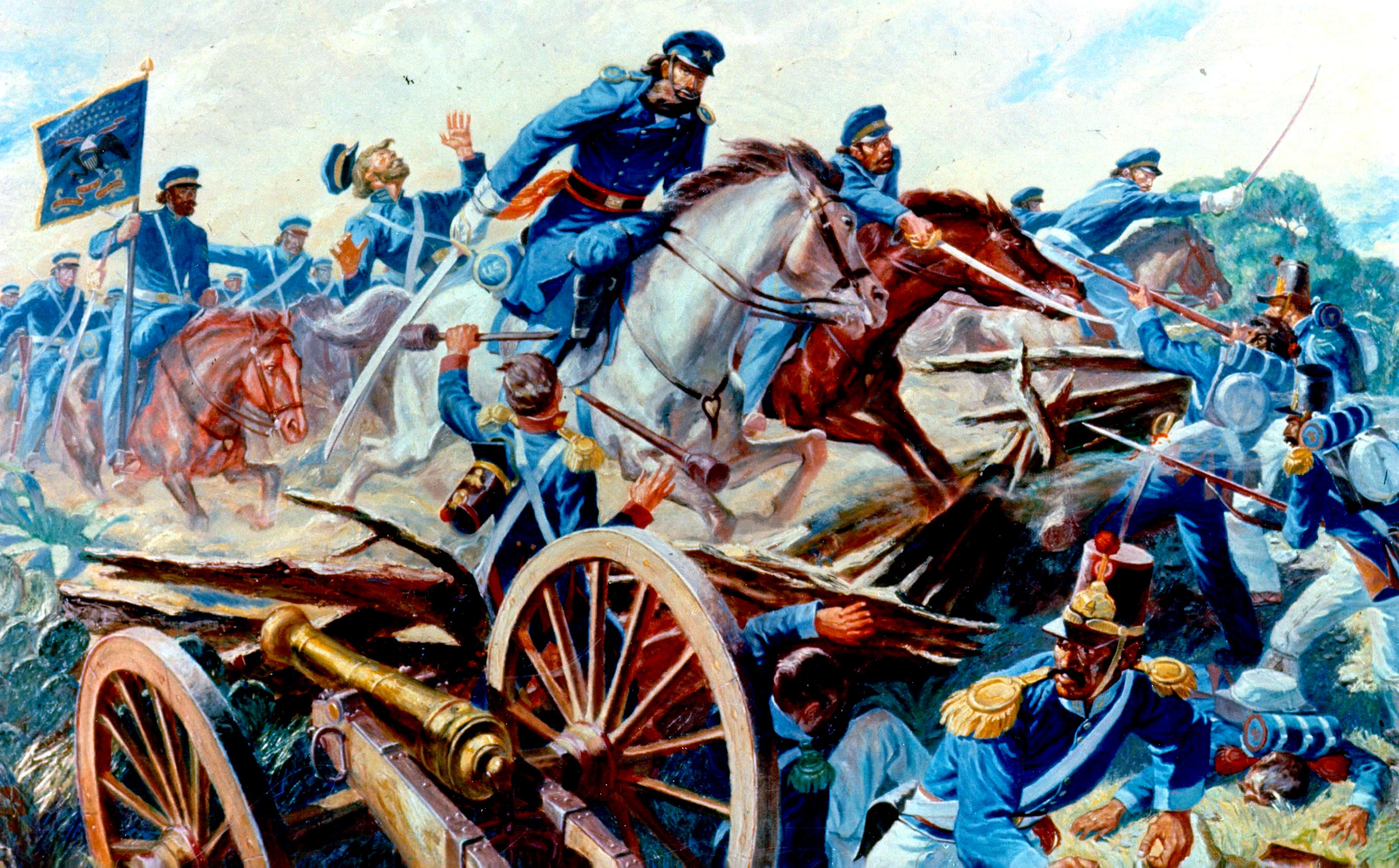
- Charge of the American Dragoons at the Battle of Resaca de la Palma
Date	May 9, 1846
Location	Resaca de la Palma Battlefield, near Brownsville, Texas, United States
Result	American victory: Retreat of Mexican Army to south of the Rio Grande

Belligerents
United States	Mexico

Commanders and leaders
Zachary Taylor	Mariano Arista

Strength
1,700	4,000

Casualties and losses
33 killed 89 wounded	154 killed 205 wounded 156 missing

The Battle of Resaca de la Palma was one of the early engagements of the Mexican–American War, where the United States Army under General Zachary Taylor engaged the retreating forces of the Mexican Ejército del Norte ("Army of the North") under General Mariano Arista on May 9, 1846. The United States emerged victorious and forced the Mexicans out of Texas.

== Background ==
Following the Mexican defeat at the Battle of Palo Alto the previous day, Arista on the morning of May 9 moved his forces to a more defensible position along a resaca, known as Resaca de Guerrero to the Mexicans but as Resaca de la Palma to the Americans. Recalling his experiences at the Siege of Fort Texas, he positioned his forces along the twelve foot deep and two hundred foot wide resaca, three miles from the Rio Grande, by 10 a.m. Arista placed most of his infantry in the ravine, thickly forested on either side, to negate the effectiveness of Taylor's artillery, with the 6th and 10th Infantry, Sappers, 2nd Light Infantry and 1st Infantry being placed east of the road, and the 2nd Infantry, Tampico Battalion and 4th Infantry west of the road. Covering the flanks in the rear were the Presidiales, the light cavalry, and the 7th and 8th Regiments, and two artillery batteries on the south bank.

Taylor reached the area about 3 p.m. and ordered Captain William W. Mackall's skirmishers and Captain Randolph Ridgely's battery along the road, with the 4th and 5th Infantry to the left and the remaining 4th and 3rd Infantry on the right.

== Battle ==
American forces began to encounter the Mexican lines at around three in the afternoon. The advance party of skirmishers under Captain Mackall had been pursuing Arista's army throughout the morning and early afternoon, and as they reached the brush around the resaca the group came under heavy rifle and artillery fire. Mackall attempted to press further in order to gain a clearer view of the Mexican position, but, lacking the firepower of Taylor's main body, was ultimately forced to retreat and await reinforcements.

By four, General Taylor had linked with Captain Mackall and had begun to deploy his army to assault Arista's position. First, he moved to destroy the Mexican skirmish line which was harassing his movements. Two infantry regiments, supported by Ridgely's artillery battery, were able to converge on Arista's skirmishers and force them back into the Mexican main line with heavy casualties. With his immediate front clear, Taylor began to press his attacks on Arista's flanks.

Fighting was disorganized and uncoordinated due to the dense chaparral and the intense Mexican artillery fire, although Ridgely did repulse a Mexican cavalry charge. As regiments entered the heavy underbrush unit cohesion broke down, as smaller and smaller groups became visibly separated from each other; many of these groups were led by non-commissioned officers as the regular officers became cut off from the rest of their men. However, this same issue plagued the Mexican defenders, as the chaparral hampered the lines of communication as well as lines of sight. As a result, the majority of the fighting occurred simultaneously but also independently within these small, separate groups, as each lacked information on the battle as a whole. This breakup of unit integrity effectively negated many of the defensive and numerical advantages the Mexican Army would have ordinarily enjoyed.

Due to the low visibility of the chaparral, Ridgely's artillery battery was unable to provide much support to the American assaults on the flanks. Rather, they concentrated on neutralizing Arista's artillery; the resulting artillery duel proved inconclusive. Taylor ordered a charge by Captain Charles A. May's dragoon squadron with the objective of clearing the Mexican battery. Supposedly, May said, "Hello Ridgely, where is that Battery? I am ordered to charge it", and Ridgely replied "Hold on Charley, 'till I draw their fire and you will see where they are." May's charge however carried them well past the Mexican artillery and although he managed to capture General Romulo Diaz de la Vega, he could not hold the guns. Taylor then ordered William G. Belknap's 5th and 8th Infantry to secure the guns, which they did. The Mexicans forces east of the road then retreated from their positions.

Up until this point of the engagement, General Arista had not taken the field to command, but rather had been in his tent performing his administrative duties. Though he had received word of the American assault, he believed it to be minor given the late hour and the assumed superiority of his position. Only when his line had begun to seriously crumble did Arista acknowledge the severity of the battle. After failing to rally his retreating infantry, Arista personally led a cavalry charge to try and break up American gains on the southern bank of the resaca. Though initially finding some success, the rough terrain quickly broke up the charge before it could deal any major damage to Taylor's forces.

West of the road, Captain Robert C. Buchanan and men of the 4th Infantry found a trail which turned towards the Mexican left flank, enabling them to take and hold the battery located there. They held the position against General Pedro de Ampudia's counterattacks, and the entire Mexican force panicked and fled across the Rio Grande, with many Mexican soldiers drowning in the attempt.

== Aftermath ==
The victory at Resaca de la Palma quickly rose to great renown among the American military and public. Personal documents from soldiers attached to General Taylor's army highlight tremendous joy and excitement from the Mexican rout, boosting an already confident morale. For the American public, the victory was among the first news they had heard of the war. In fact, Mexico's declaration of war against the United States did not even reach President James Polk in Washington D.C. until May 9, the very day that the Battle of Resaca de la Palma was fought. As a result of this delay, a majority of American citizens received the news of the outbreak of hostilities and the victory at Resaca de la Palma simultaneously. The overwhelming success of General Taylor against the Mexican forces colored the American perception of the war, and Congress' call for the raising of new regiments (ratified prior to the news of the victory) was quickly overfilled by thousands of eager volunteers.

The Battle of Resaca de la Palma blunted the Mexican offensive into Texan territory and opened an opportunity for General Taylor to invade Mexico. Strategically, the battle cemented American tactics that they would use throughout the war to great effect; in particular, Resaca de la Palma highlighted the power of American artillery against their Mexican counterparts and the ways in which Mexican commanders sought to neutralize that advantage. The mix of different types of shot used by Ridgely's gunners also proved to be quite potent and allowed them to respond to a variety of battlefield situations much more rapidly than the Mexican artillery, especially when confronting cavalry charges.

The Mexican Army left behind a number of artillery pieces, the colors of Mexico's lauded Tampico Battalion, and other baggage which included Arista's writing desk and silver service. One of the most important finds among the documents was General Arista's personal map of the Eastern Interior Department, which provided a detailed, up-to-date view of the surrounding regions of Tamaulipas, Nuevo León, and Coahuila. This comprehensive map proved to be much more reliable than General Taylor's maps, which, having been made in the early 1830's, were over a decade old. The capture of this map provided Taylor with an invaluable resource in planning the next phase of his campaign, especially now that the fighting had moved to the opposite side of the Rio Grande, where American intelligence was less reliable. Among the several captured Mexican artillery pieces were two 8-pounder bronze guns, two 6-pounder bronze guns, and four 4-pounder bronze guns.

The rout of General Arista's army at Resaca de la Palma also relieved the Mexican siege of Fort Texas, where a garrison had been left following Taylor's move to Point Isabel prior to the Battle of Palo Alto. Only eight miles from Palo Alto and four miles from Resaca de la Palma, the garrison was well within earshot of the fighting and the noise of the battles proved a great boost to the morale of the besieged men. As the Mexican lines deteriorated, the batteries at Fort Texas were able to contribute to the rout, joining with Taylor's advance troops in forcing Arista's army back across the Rio Grande.

Taylor's army settled into their Fort Texas campsite as Taylor considered his next move, although he did exchange prisoners with Arista. Taylor crossed the Rio Grande on 18 May, Arista's army having abandoned their artillery, sick and wounded at Linares, Nuevo Leon during their retreat to Monterrey.

Before accepting a prisoner exchange with General Arista, Taylor was noted for his humane treatment of the abandoned Mexican wounded, giving them the same care as was given to the American wounded. After tending to the wounded he performed the last rites for the dead of both the American and Mexican soldiers killed during the battle. General Arista was also recognized for his care of captured American soldiers, especially pertaining to the men belonging to Captain Seth Thornton's cavalry patrol which had been ambushed within the first days of the conflict.

The Resaca De La Palma Battlefield is in the city limits of present-day Brownsville, Texas, but is part of the Palo Alto Battlefield National Historical Park.

The Battle of Resaca de la Palma inspired the name of Resaca, Georgia, a community that later became the site of the Battle of Resaca. George H. Thomas fought at both of these battles.

== Gallery ==
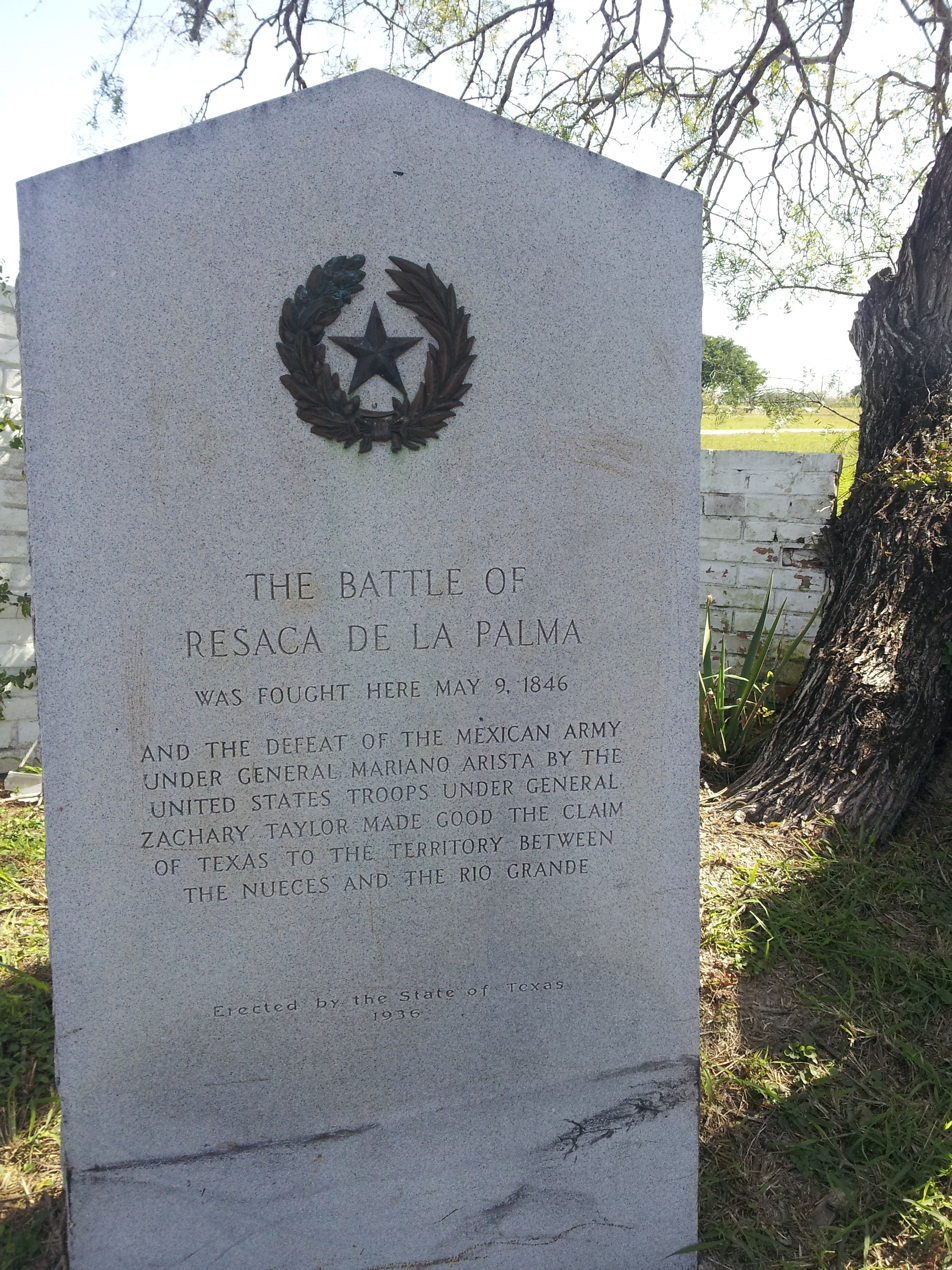
Battle of Resaca de La Palma Texas historical marker

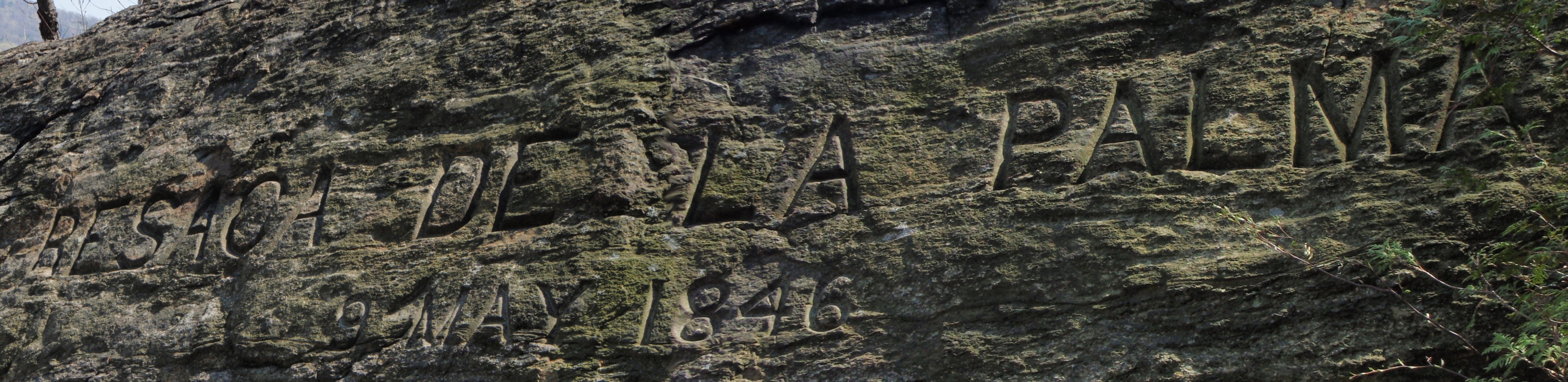
Monument to the Battle of Resaca de la Palma on Flirtation Walk at West Point

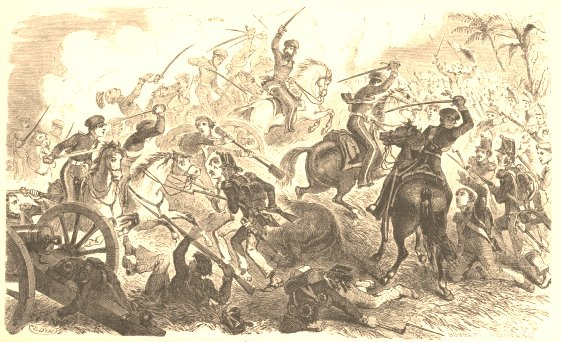
Drawing of the battle

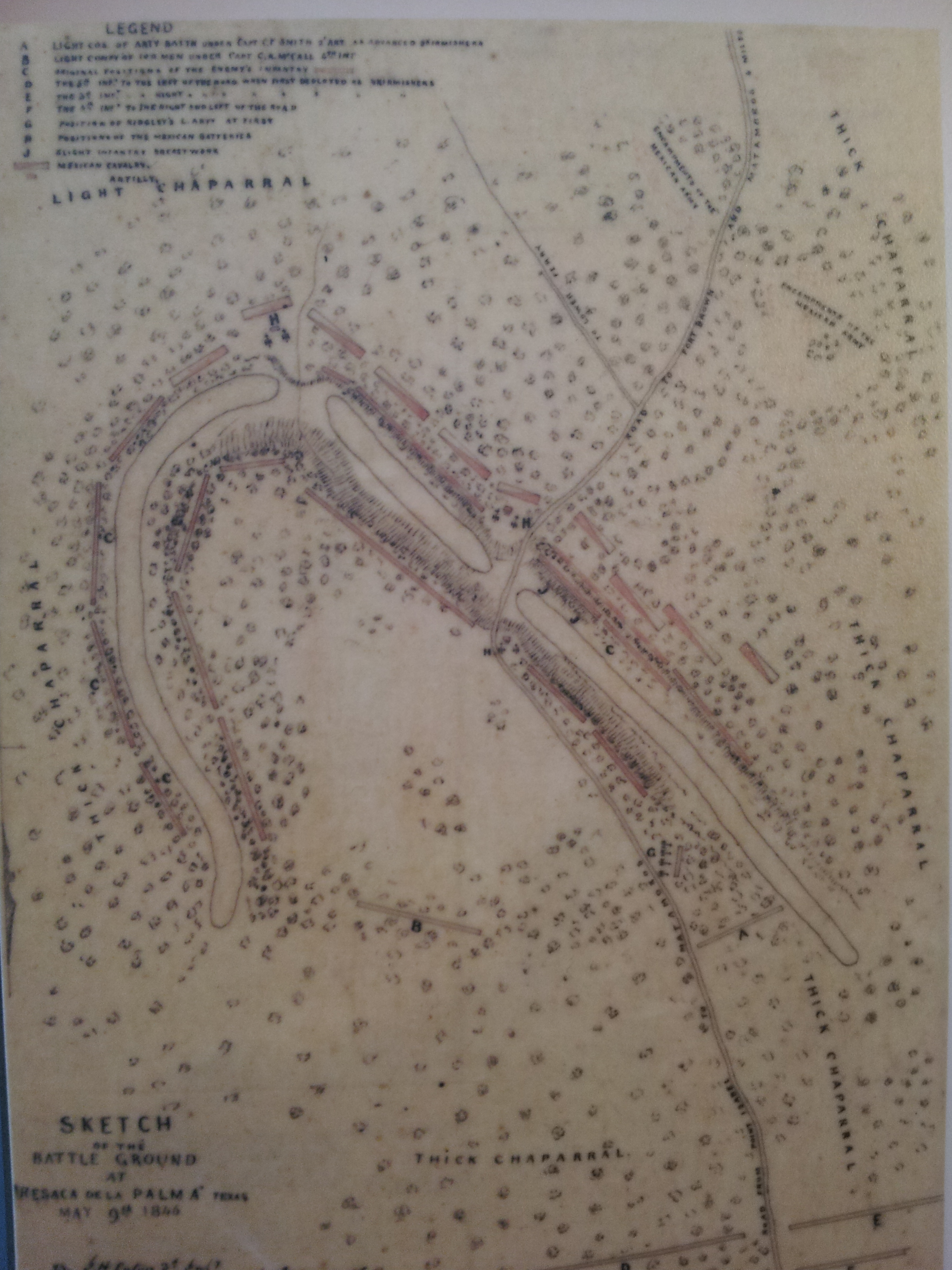
Period map of the battle

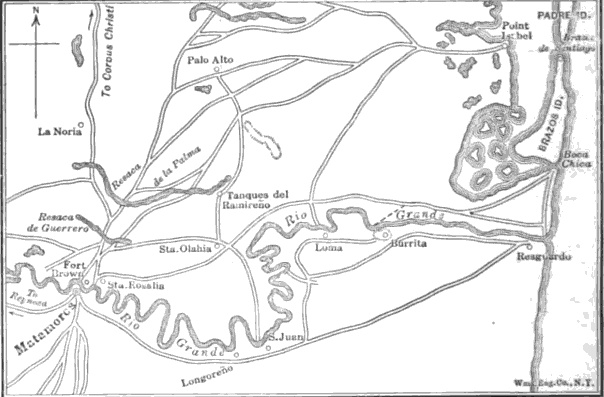
Map of the reseca

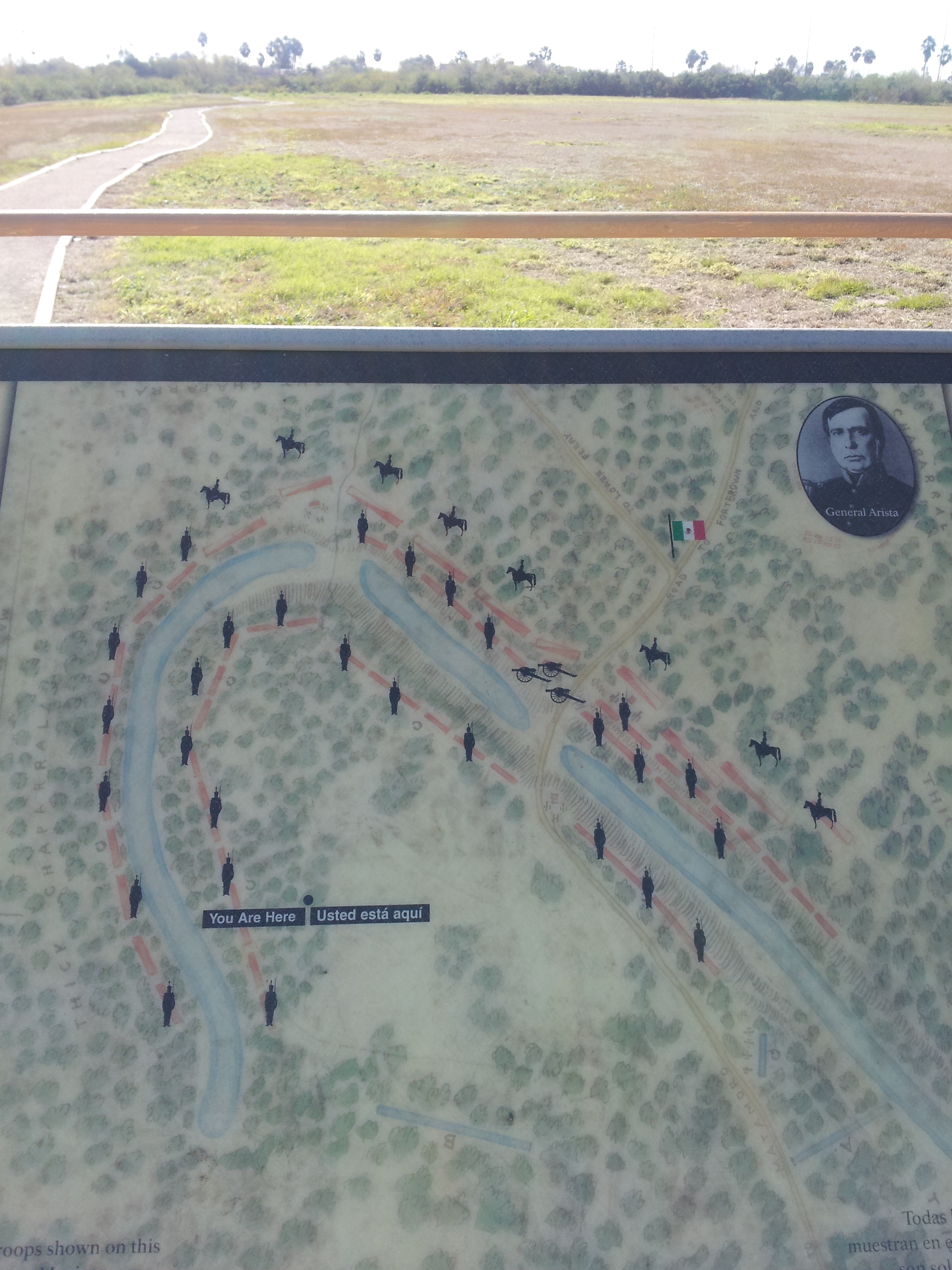
Battle of Resaca de La Palma battlefield site

== See also ==
- List of battles of the Mexican–American War
- 1848 in Mexico
- List of conflicts in the United States
- Saint Patrick's Battalion
