= Thornton Affair =

Part of the Mexican–American War in 1846

Thornton Ambush
- Part of the Texas Campaign of the Mexican–American War
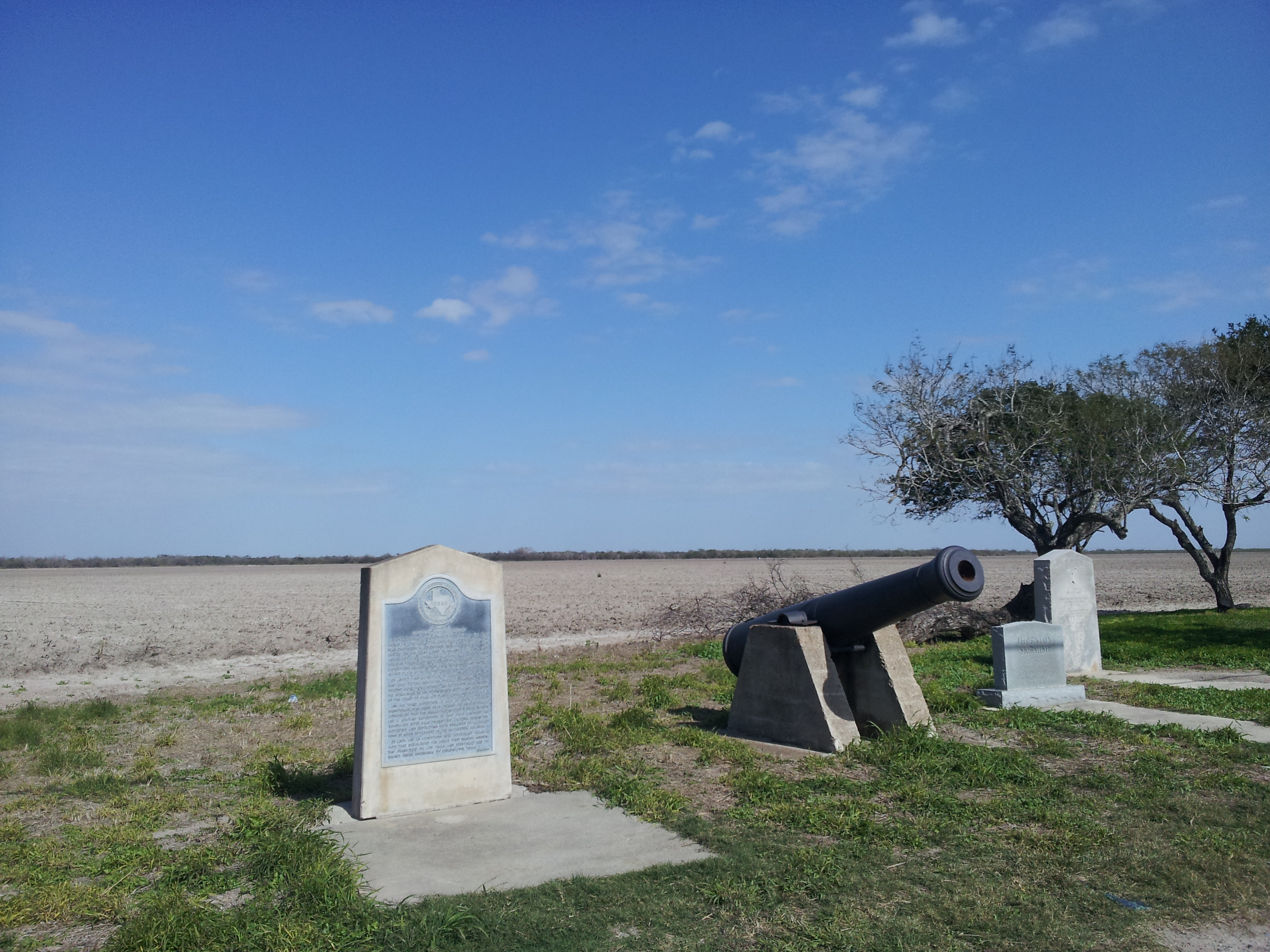
- Rancho de Carricitos
Date	April 25, 1846; 180 years ago
Location	2.5 miles east of Bluetown, Texas 26°03′43″N 97°47′03″W
Result	Mexican victory: Start of the Mexican–American War

Belligerents
United States	Mexico

Commanders and leaders
(United States) Seth Thornton (POW) (United States) William J. Hardee (POW)	Anastasio Torrejón

Strength
80	1,600

Casualties and losses
14 killed 6 wounded 1 fatally wounded 59 captured	Unknown, but light

The Thornton Affair was a battle in 1846 between the military forces of the United States and Mexico 20 miles (32 km) west upriver from Zachary Taylor's camp along the Rio Grande. The much larger Mexican force defeated the Americans in the opening of hostilities, and was the primary justification for U.S. President James K. Polk's call to Congress to declare war. It is also known as the Thornton Skirmish, Thornton's Defeat, or Rancho Carricitos.

== Background ==
Although the United States had annexed Texas, both the US and Mexico claimed the area between the Nueces River and the Rio Grande. Polk had ordered Taylor's "Army of Occupation" to the Rio Grande early in 1846 after Mexican President Mariano Paredes declared in his inaugural address that he would uphold the integrity of Mexican territory to the Sabine River.

Mariano Arista assumed command of the Division of the North on April 4 and arrived at Matamoros on April 24, making the total force there about 5,000 men; he sent word to Taylor of his presence. Arista promptly ordered his subordinate, General Anastasio Torrejón, to cross the Rio Grande fourteen miles upstream at La Palangana.

== Battle ==
Subsequent to Paredes' April 23 declaration of a defensive war, Taylor received two reports on April 24 of Mexicans crossing the Rio Grande, the first crossing below his camp, the other at a crossing upriver. Taylor sent two detachments to investigate; Captain Croghan Ker to investigate downriver and Captain Seth B. Thornton, accompanied by two dragoon companies, to investigate upriver. Ker found nothing but Thornton rode into an ambush and his 80-man force was quickly overwhelmed by Torrejon's 1,600, resulting in the capture of those not immediately killed. Thornton's guide brought news of the hostilities to Taylor and was followed by a cart from Torrejón containing six wounded Americans; the general stated that he had freed them as an act of mercy.

== Aftermath ==
In the fierce encounter, fourteen of Thornton's men were killed outright, six were wounded, and one was fatally wounded, while the rest were taken prisoner (including Captain Thornton and his second in command, Captain William J. Hardee). Mexican casualties are unknown. Torrejón continued on to the Matamoros-Point Isabel road, surprising Samuel H. Walker's Texas Rangers on April 28, before continuing on to Longoreno to cover the crossing of the main Mexican army.

Following the Battle of Palo Alto and the Battle of Resaca de la Palma, Arista and Taylor agreed to a prisoner exchange which resulted in the release of Thornton, Hardee and their men. Thornton was later killed on August 20, 1847 in an engagement at Churubusco outside Mexico City. Coincidentally, this soldier who was wounded at the war's opening act was killed in its final conflict.

== Declaration of war ==
Upon learning of the incident, President James K. Polk asked for a declaration of war before a joint session of the United States Congress, and summed up his justification for war by famously stating:

"The cup of forbearance had been exhausted even before the recent information from the frontier of the Del Norte [Rio Grande]. But now, after reiterated menaces, Mexico has passed the boundary of the United States, has invaded our territory and shed American blood upon the American soil. She has proclaimed that hostilities have commenced, and that the two nations are now at war.".

On May 13, 1846, the U.S. Congress declared war on Mexico, despite the Mexican government's position that Thornton had crossed the border into the Mexican state of Tamaulipas, which Mexico maintained began south of the Nueces River (the historical border of the Mexican state and former Spanish province of Texas). Opposition also existed in the United States, with one senator declaring that the affair had been "as much an act of aggression on our part as is a man's pointing a pistol at another's breast". Congressman Abraham Lincoln demanded to know the "particular spot of soil on which the blood of our citizens was so shed" (the spot resolutions). The ensuing Mexican–American War was waged from 1846 to 1848 which cost the lives of many thousands and the loss of all northern provinces from Mexico. The Treaty of Guadalupe Hidalgo ended the war on February 2, 1848, and established the Rio Grande as the border between the U.S. and Mexico, and led to Mexico recognizing Texas as a part of the United States.

== See also ==
- List of battles of the Mexican–American War
- Attacks on the United States
