= Charles A. May =

United States Army officer (1818–1864)

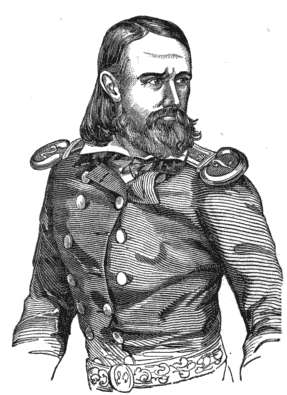
- Born: August 9, 1818; Washington, D.C., United States
- Died: December 24, 1864 (aged 46); New York, New York, United States
- Military career
- Allegiance: United States
- Branch: United States Army
- Service years: 1836–1861
- Rank: Major; Brevet Colonel
- Units: Second Regiment of Dragoons; First Regiment of Dragoons
- Conflicts: Second Seminole War; Mexican–American War; Battle of Palo Alto; Battle of Resaca de la Palma; Battle of Monterrey; Battle of Buena Vista; Bleeding Kansas

Charles Augustus May (August 9, 1818 – December 24, 1864) was an American officer of the United States Army who served in the Mexican War and other campaigns over a 25-year career. He is best known for successfully leading a cavalry charge against Mexican artillery at the Battle of Resaca de la Palma.

May spent most of his career in the Second Regiment of Dragoons, but also had a brief stint in the First Regiment of Dragoons. As a lieutenant, he participated in the Second Seminole War, where he was responsible for the capture of an important tribal chief. During the Mexican War, he commanded a squadron during Zachary Taylor's expedition, and saw action in the Battles of Palo Alto, Resaca de la Palma, Monterrey, and Buena Vista. He distinguished himself in those actions and was eventually promoted to the rank of brevet colonel, with a permanent rank of major. May later served in various parts of the American frontier, including during the Bleeding Kansas crisis.

He resigned his commission in 1861 and took a job as a railroad executive in New York City, but died three years later. His name is included in a verse that commemorates Mexican War heroes from Maryland in the state song, "Maryland, My Maryland".

== Biography ==
=== Early life ===
May was born in Washington, D.C., on August 9, 1818, the son of a doctor in a prominent Baltimore family. He received a civil education, but applied for a commission directly to President Andrew Jackson, who was impressed by his soldierly appearance, bearing, and skill at horsemanship. In 1836, he entered the United States Army as a second lieutenant in the Second Regiment of Dragoons. During the Second Seminole War, May was responsible for the capture of King Philip (Ee-mat-la), the Seminole nation's principal chieftain. He was promoted from first lieutenant to captain on February 2, 1841.

=== Mexican War service ===
On March 8, 1846, after a final attempt to pressure Mexico to settle on a boundary for Texas, Secretary of War William L. Marcy ordered Brigadier General Zachary Taylor to move his army, which included May's dragoon squadron, to the Rio Grande. Taylor's destination was the river's north bank, directly opposite the Mexican town of Matamoros, which stood at a natural choke-point and controlled access to well-traveled routes to the south. When Taylor refused to leave the region, Mexican cavalry ambushed a dragoon detachment under Captain Seth B. Thornton on April 25, 1846, which officially commenced hostilities. On May 8, 1846, the two main forces met at the Battle of Palo Alto, where May's squadron was held in reserve and mounted an unsuccessful cavalry charge.

==== Battle of Resaca de la Palma ====
Searching for more favorable terrain, the Mexican commander led his army five miles to the south. On May 9, 1846, the pursuing American element met them at the Battle of Resaca de la Palma. General Taylor's force received heavy fire from a battery of eight Mexican artillery pieces, which halted its advance. Taylor ordered Captain May to lead his unit, a squadron consisting of D and E companies of the Second Dragoons, to silence the enemy guns. May told his men to "Remember your Regiment and follow your officers!" Today, the phrase is the unofficial motto of the 2nd Cavalry Regiment, which traces its lineage to May's unit.

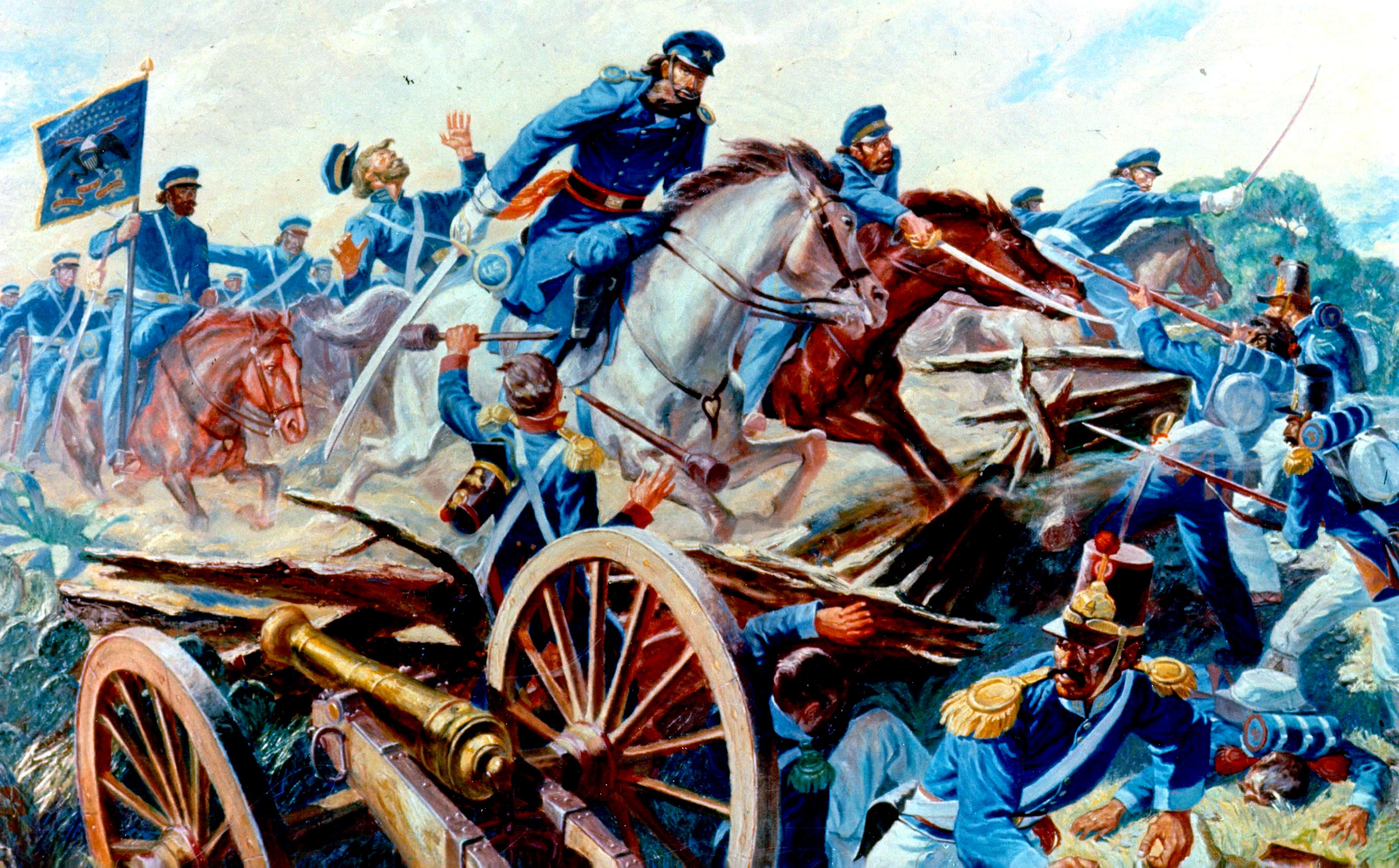
Remember Your Regiment, depicts Charles May (center, on white horse) during the Battle of Resaca de la Plama.

He led his cavalry squadron on the charge and, despite heavy casualties, secured the objective and silenced the guns before being forced to withdraw due to a lack of infantry support. The dragoons also captured one of the Mexican commanders, General Rómulo Díaz de la Vega, on the gun line. With the Mexican artillery out of action, the 8th Infantry Regiment and 5th Infantry Regiment were able to maneuver forward and eventually drove the enemy from their positions. Of approximately eighty men, the dragoons lost one lieutenant, seven privates, and twenty-eight horses, with an additional ten privates wounded. Colonel David E. Twiggs, the regimental commander, commented that "After the unsurpassed, if not unequalled charge of Captain May's squadron, the enemy was unable to fire a gun." In his official after-action report, Taylor wrote that "The charge of cavalry against the enemy's batteries on the 9th, was gallantly led by Captain May, and had complete success." After the battle, May received two brevets to the rank of lieutenant colonel.

==== Battle of Monterrey ====
After Resaca de la Palma, Mexican forces were cleared from the Texan side of the Rio Grande, but additional operations were required to force Mexico to agree to the border. The Mexican commander, General Mariano Arista, withdrew his forces to Linares, with Taylor in pursuit for sixty miles before returning to Fort Brown for reinforcements. He then marched against Monterrey. The heavily fortified city had a 10,000-man garrison under Arista's replacement, General Pedro de Ampudia, but its supply line running south to Saltillo was vulnerable. Lacking the heavy artillery needed for a siege, Taylor planned a double envelopment, with one division executing a turning movement to cut the supply line and attack from the west and south, and his other two divisions assaulting the north side of the city.

May's squadron was attached as a direct-reporting unit to the newly promoted General Twiggs' 1st Texas Division, which was to be committed to the north side of Monterrey. On September 21, Taylor launched his attack on the city, but failed to synchronize his two forces. Poor Mexican leadership allowed the Americans to avert disaster, and after some intense urban fighting, General Ampudia offered Taylor an eight-week ceasefire that was highly favorable to the Mexicans. Taylor accepted, which caused President James K. Polk, furious at the agreement, to transfer most of his forces to Winfield Scott.

==== Battle of Buena Vista ====
On February 20, 1847, May led a reconnaissance force that included an attached company of Texas Rangers under Major Ben McCulloch and artillery section of six-pounder guns under Captain J.M. Washington. During the mission, the advanced element encountered small units of Mexican General José Vicente Miñón's cavalry brigade and spotted a dust cloud to the south, presumably produced by a much larger force. Lieutenant Samuel Sturgis was captured during a reconnoiter before May's force caught up with the advanced element, spotted more Mexican lancers, and took up defensive positions. After scouting parties failed to locate the main enemy force, May's unit returned to camp to report to General Taylor. After riding 80 miles in 24 hours, the only fire encountered was from the American sentries as May's force re-entered friendly lines.

Three days later, on February 23, 1847, after having moved to better defensive terrain, General Taylor's force was met by General Antonio López de Santa Anna's numerically superior army just south of Saltillo for the Battle of Buena Vista. May's squadron was reinforced with Troops A and E of the First Dragoons and a squadron of Arkansas cavalry under the command of Captain Albert Pike. The American line was thrown into jeopardy when Colonel Bowles of the Second Indiana Regiment ordered his unit to retreat for reasons unknown. With skillful artillery support from Washington's guns, the situation was restored by the Second Illinois Regiment and rallied Indianans. At that point, Taylor arrived with May's dragoons and the First Mississippi Rifles under Colonel Jefferson Davis, which halted General Anastasio Torrejón's cavalry. Miñón's brigade of 1,500 Mexican lancers flanked the American line and assaulted the supply trains guarded by the Kentucky and Arkansas cavalry, and in the process killed former governor Colonel Archibald Yell. The dragoons counterattacked Miñón's flank and routed the Mexican lancers. May was wounded during the action. On May 24, 1848, he was promoted from brevet lieutenant colonel to brevet colonel for his gallantry, backdated to the day of the battle.

=== Later years ===
After the Mexican War, May was posted to several parts of the American frontier, including California, New Mexico, and Texas. He served with the First Regiment of Dragoons in the Kansas Territory during its violent abolitionist clashes. On March 3, 1855, he was promoted to major and exchanged positions with another officer to return to his old unit, the Second Dragoons. On October 27, 1855, the regiment marched to Texas, under the command of Albert Sidney Johnson.

May resigned his commission as a brevet colonel on April 20, 1861, and moved to New York City, where he served as the vice president of the Eighth Avenue Railroad. He died there on December 24, 1864, at the age of 46. He had a history of heart problems and poor health dating back to at least 1850.

May was described variously as a courageous, sometimes reckless, and unpopular officer. Samuel Chamberlain, who served in the First Dragoons and wrote scathing descriptions of most of his contemporaries, was most critical of May. Chamberlain believed May had received unjustified praise for his actions at Resaca de la Palma and referred to him as the "Murat of America" and an "ass in the lion's skin". In 1861, James Ryder Randall referred to "dashing May" alongside other Mexican War heroes from Maryland in a poem that later became the state song, "Maryland, My Maryland".
