= Henry J. Wilson (U.S. Army officer) =

Henry Wilson
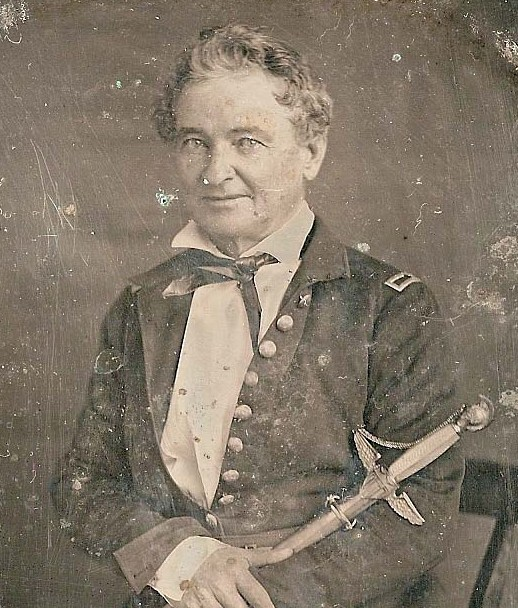
- Portrait of Col. Henry Wilson, c. 1855
- Born: 1793; Philadelphia, Pennsylvania
- Died: February 21, 1872 (aged 78–79) New Orleans, Louisiana
- Branch: United States Army
- Service years: 1813–1861
- Rank: Colonel
- Commands: 7th Infantry Regiment; Seventh Military Division; Department of Texas
- Conflicts: Indian Wars: First Seminole War; Second Seminole War; Mexican–American War: Battle of Monterey; Siege of Vera Cruz; Indian Wars: Comanche Wars, 1850s

Henry J. Wilson (born 1793 – died 1872) was a U.S. Army officer who served in five wars and countless conflicts.

== Background and career ==
He was born in 1793 in Philadelphia and was commissioned an ensign in the 28th U.S. Infantry in 1813. He was promoted to second lieutenant in 1814. In 1815, he was recommissioned and was sent with General Andrew Jackson to Florida to serve during the First Seminole War. While in service there, he was promoted to captain and made the rear adjutant of Jackson's Army. In Pensacola, he met his future wife, Mary Henrietta Innerarity, daughter of John Innerarity, scion of the Forbes & Co. Indian trading firm.

He served in various posts in Baton Rouge, Minnesota, and Michigan and later served in the Second Seminole War, at one time as military governor of the western Florida military district, after being promoted to brevet major and then major. He was detached from duty in April 1837 to mediate a conflict at Mobile Point, Alabama, over the proper delivery of contracted beef for the Creek Indians who were being rounded up and transported to their new lands in the West. In 1838, he headed up the final preparations for the migration of the Cherokee Indians from western North Carolina and eastern Tennessee, the Trail of Tears.

He served in Arkansas as a major and later lieutenant colonel of the First Infantry Regiment and was called by General Zachary Taylor to go to the Texas-Mexican border in June 1846 and commanded the First Brigade, made up of four companies of the First Infantry. He fought in the Battle of Monterey and was breveted a colonel for his bravery. Wilson was later detached from Taylor's forces to go with General Winfield Scott to the Siege of Vera Cruz. Wilson was appointed to the post of military governor of that city in March 1847 and served in that capacity, with a few leaves of absences for sickness, until the U.S. Army pulled out of Mexico in July 1848. He was then attached to duty on the Texas border fighting Comanche Indians.

== Colonel ==
In June 1851, Wilson was promoted to colonel of the Seventh Infantry, replacing Colonel James Arbuckle who had died of cholera earlier that year. After completing his duties in Texas, he joined his new regiment in November of that year, officially assuming command of the regiment and the Seventh Military District, headquartered at Fort Smith, Arkansas. His regiment helped to maintain peace throughout Indian Territory during the 1850s.

In January 1858, the Seventh Infantry was among the troops assigned to the Utah Expedition to put down a possible Mormon rebellion. Colonel Wilson however was on leave at the time the orders arrived and was in San Antonio temporarily commanding the Department of Texas through the summer of 1858. Struggling with health issues, he returned home to New Orleans on sick leave where he remained for the next two years. Consequently, contrary to some published accounts, Colonel Wilson was never in Utah.

== Civil War ==
In February 1861, he resigned his commission in the U.S. Army after 48 years of service. He had not rejoined his regiment in nearly three years.

He is rumored to have offered his services to fight for the Confederate States, but no evidence exists to suggest he was accepted or had any military role. He later served on the board of directors of the Bank of New Orleans.

== Death ==
He died February 21, 1872, in New Orleans and was buried in St. Joseph Cemetery in Lafayette Parish, Louisiana.
