= Palo Alto Battlefield National Historical Park =

National Historical Park of the United States

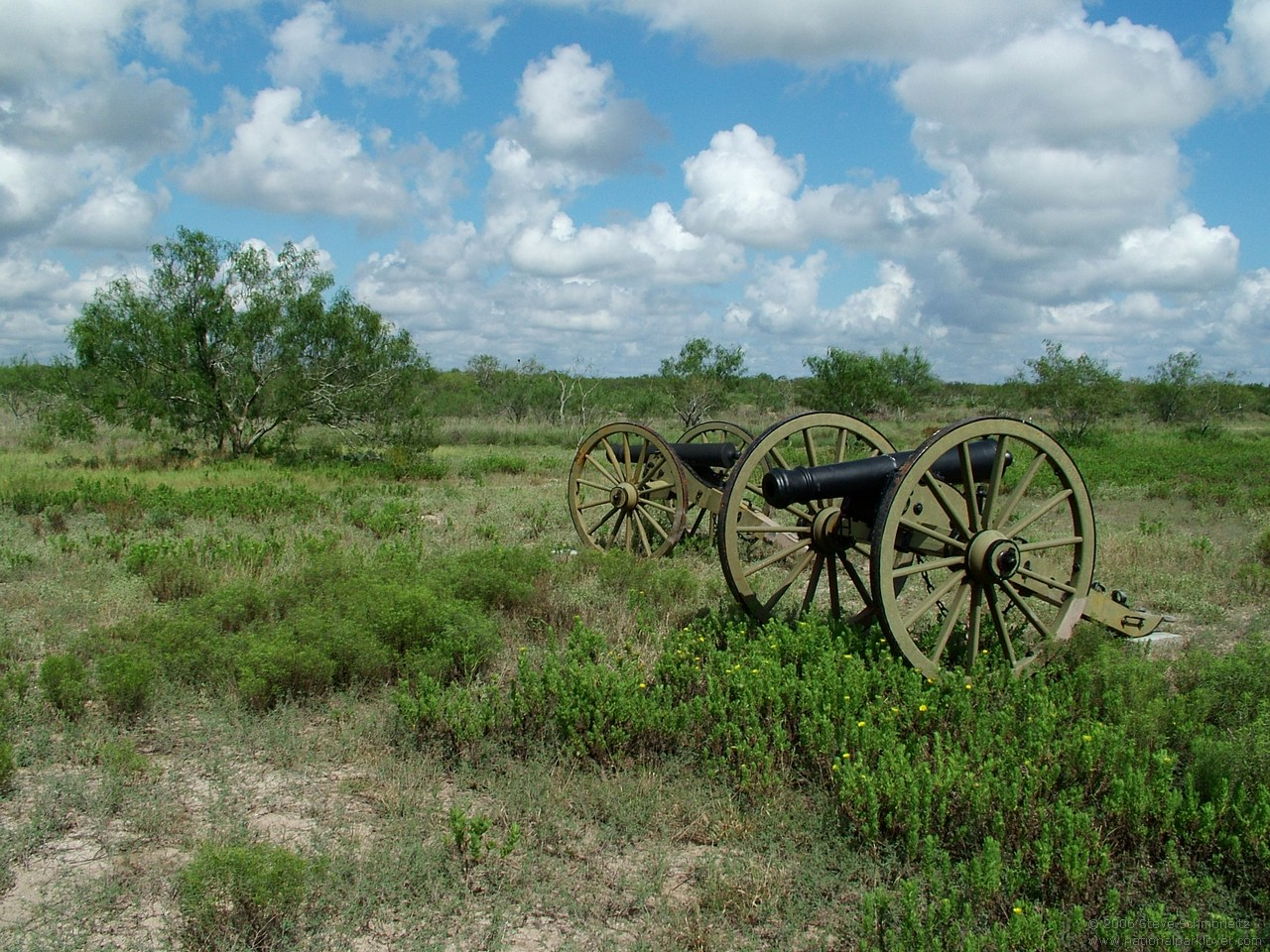
- Palo Alto battlegrounds today

- Location within Texas Location within the United States
- Location: Cameron County, Texas, U.S.
- Nearest city: Brownsville, Texas
- Coordinates: 26°1′17″N 97°28′50″W
- Area: 3,357.42 acres (13.5870 km^{2}); 1,039.62 acres (420.72 ha) federal
- Established: November 10, 1915
- Visitors: 168,550 (in 2025)
- Governing body: National Park Service
- Website: Palo Alto Battlefield National Historical Park
- Palo Alto Battlefield National Historical Park
- U.S. National Register of Historic Places
- U.S. National Historic Landmark
- U.S. National Historical Park
- Former U.S. National Historic Site
- Built: 1846
- NRHP reference No.: 66000812

Significant dates
- Designated NHL: December 19, 1960
- Designated NHP: March 30, 2009
- Designated NHS: November 19, 1978
- Delisted NHS: March 30, 2009

Palo Alto Battlefield National Historical Park in Brownsville, Texas, United States, is a National Park Service unit which preserves the grounds of the May 8, 1846, Battle of Palo Alto. It was the first major conflict in a border dispute that soon precipitated the Mexican–American War. The United States Army victory here made the invasion of Mexico possible. The historic site portrays the battle and the war, and its causes and consequences, from the perspectives of both the United States and Mexico.

The National Park Service has acquired a little more than a third of the authorized land for the park, including the 300 acres (1.2 km^{2}) southern core battlefield tract, which served as the location for Mexican forces during the Battle of Palo Alto. Private landowners still control some 2,000 acres (8.1 km^{2}) of the battlefield. Honey Mesquite (Prosopis glandulosa), although a native plant, is present in an unusually high concentration, altering the cultural landscape and threatening the natural and cultural resources at the park.

The park's visitor center features exhibits about the battle and the Mexican–American War, as well as a 15-minute video titled "War on the Rio Grande". A half-mile trail leads to an overlook of the battlefield and includes interpretive panels.

== Background ==
The Battle of Palo Alto, fought on May 8, 1846, near modern Brownsville, Texas, was the first battle of the Mexican–American War. On April 30, 1846, Mexican federal troops under the command of General Mariano Arista crossed the Rio Grande into the disputed territory east of the river with the intention of attacking American General Zachary Taylor's forward base, Fort Texas. Taylor, expecting Fort Texas to be invested, took his main force approximately 20 miles east to protect his main supply base, Fort Polk, leaving 500 men, under Major Jacob Brown, to garrison the forward base. Arista's investment of Fort Texas began on May 3 and continued for several days, during which time Major Brown was mortally wounded. On May 7 Taylor departed Fort Polk, on the coast near Port Isabel, and began to move west towards the relief of Fort Texas. Arista, given timely intelligence of Taylor's departure, moved his main force to block Taylor along the Port Isabel Road. The two armies met the next day, May 8, when Taylor's columns engaged the Mexican line around 2 P.M. The Americans repulsed an initial cavalry charge to their right, and were then able to advance 1,000 yards when a grass fire forced Arista's line back. After a second failed cavalry charge, Arista advanced on the American left but was driven back by the quick and accurate fire of the American light artillery. Eager to seize the initiative from Arista, a mixed force of infantry and dragoons pressed forward against the retreating Mexican right, eventually driving them from the field. After dusk ended the fighting, Arista began to pull his forces away from the battlefield to a more defensible position in a dry river bed to the south. Taylor pursued the following day, leading to the Battle of Resaca de la Palma, on May 9.

While the battle was a clear American victory and casualties were very light, 5 dead and 43 wounded, two of the dead were the resolute commander of Fort Texas, Major Brown, and the innovative artillery officer Major Samuel Ringgold, whose fast and mobile "flying artillery" would continue to be a major advantage to Taylor throughout the campaign.

== Administrative history ==
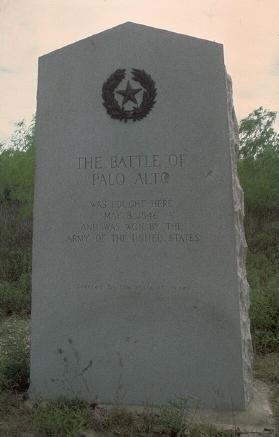
Battle of Palo Alto historical marker

Palo Alto Battlefield was designated a National Historic Landmark on December 19, 1960. It became Palo Alto Battlefield National Historic Site on November 10, 1978, with a boundary change authorized on June 23, 1992. Establishing legislation in 1991 (Pub. L. 102–304) was sponsored by Rep. Solomon Ortiz.

On March 30, 2009 the site was redesignated a National Historical Park, and the park was expanded to include the Resaca de la Palma Battlefield, which is a separate 34 acres inside the Brownsville city limits.

The Consolidated Appropriations Act, 2023 authorized the addition of Fort Brown (166 acres) to Palo Alto Battlefield National Historical Park if a study finds it feasible.

== See also ==
- List of National Historic Landmarks in Texas
- National Register of Historic Places listings in Cameron County, Texas
