= Francisco Mejia (general) =

Mexican general

General Francisco Mejia was a Mexican general. He started his military career at the age of 15 in the Spanish colonial army. His first major battle was in Mexico's war of Independence in 1821 and he also fought when Spain invaded Mexico in 1829.

The Battle of San Jacinto occurred in 1836 and was won by the Texans, allowing them to become an independent nation until they became part of the United States in 1845.

Mejia was serving as a commander and was told to kill 200 Texans after they were defeated at Ciudad Mier (Mier Expedition) in December 1842. He refused as he didn't feel such a punishment was correct. Mejia chose to leave the army after the order but would return at a later time.

Gen. Francisco Mejia is mostly known for his proclamation against Texas written in Matamoros, March 18, 1846. It states the dispute over land is a "scandalous violation of the rights of nations" and that "dissimulation, fraud, and the basest treachery" had been employed "in order to obtain possession ... of the territory of a friendly nation." This was interpreted as a threat of invasion, regardless of Mexico’s permission.

Mejia also provided a warning by saying "Fellow-countrymen: With an enemy which respects not its own laws, which shamelessly derides the very principles invoked by it previously, in order to excuse its ambitious views, we have no other resource than arms." this implied that Mejia was aware the U.S.’s demands would go beyond Texas, and wanted Mexico to prepare for war.

From May 3 to May 9 Gen. Francisco Mejia led 1,400 men into battle with Fort Texas. He also fought in the Battle of Monterrey which lasted from September 21 through September 24, 1846. Mejia led troops in the Battle of Buena Vista from February 21 and 22, 1847 and in the Battle of Contreras August 19 through the 20th, in 1847.
