= William G. Belknap =

US Army soldier (1794–1851)

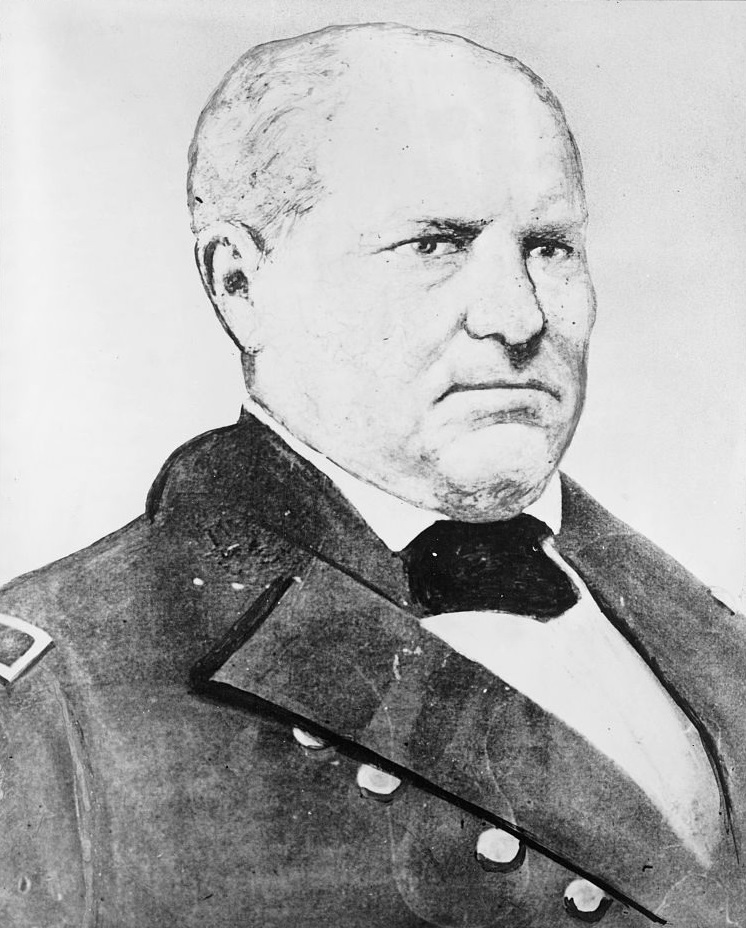
- Born: September 7, 1794; Newburgh, New York
- Died: November 10, 1851 (aged 57) Fort Washita
- Spouse: Ann Clark (1801-1858)
- Children: 4

William Goldsmith Belknap (September 7, 1794 – November 10, 1851), a career soldier in the United States Army, was brevetted three times for service in three wars, attained the rank of brigadier general by brevet, and served as commandant of Fort Gibson, Fort Washita, and Fort Smith.

== Biography ==
Belknap was born in Newburgh, New York on September 7, 1794, the son of Samuel Belknap and Mary Goldsmith. He was a first lieutenant in the War of 1812, during which he was wounded in the sortie from Fort Erie, Ontario on September 17, 1814. He became captain on February 1, 1822; major by brevet on February 1, 1832; and major on January 31, 1842. In 1828 Belknap assisted in establishing Fort Leavenworth in Kansas. He received promotion to brevet lieutenant colonel on March 15, 1842, for his services during the Second Seminole War in Florida.

Belknap took part in several battles of the Mexican–American War. He received brevet promotion to colonel for gallantry in General Zachary Taylor's Rio Grande campaign. He acted as inspector general at the Battle of Monterrey, and was promoted to brigadier general by brevet on February 23, 1847, for services at the Battle of Buena Vista. He was promoted to lieutenant colonel on September 26, 1847. Following the Mexican–American War, Belknap commanded his regiment and the garrison of Fort Gibson, Oklahoma from December 14, 1848, to May 7, 1850. In 1849, Belknap was elected an honorary member of the New York Society of the Cincinnati.

On November 10, 1851, Belknap died of typhoid dysentery while near Fort Washita in then Choctaw nation Indian Territory while scouting locations for a military post to protect native lines, California-bound emigrants and settlers en route from the Brazos River to Fort Washita, a hostile Indian Territory. He was buried at Fort Washita, and later reinterred at Oakland Cemetery in Keokuk, Iowa, when his son, William Worth had his remains moved to Iowa.

== Family ==
In 1821, Belknap married Ann Clark (1801–1858) in Keokuk. They were the parents of four children, including Anna Mary (1821–1893), Clara Belknap Wolcott (1824–1906), William Worth (1829–1890) and Frederick Augustus (1832–1832). William W. Belknap was a major general in the Union Army during the American Civil War and served as United States Secretary of War from 1869 to 1876.
