= Francisco Pérez =

Francisco Pérez may refer to:

== Arts and entertainment ==
- Francisco Pérez (musician) (1917–1951), Guatemalan singer, composer and guitarist
- Narf (singer) (1968–2016), Galician singer-songwriter

== Politicians ==
- Francisco Antonio Pérez (1764–1828), Chilean political figure
- Francisco Pérez (general), Mexican commander at the 1847 Battle of Buena Vista
- Francisco Pérez Mackenna (born 1958), Chilean politician
- Francisco Pérez (governor) (born 1969), Governor of Mendoza Province, Argentina
- Francisco Flores Pérez (born 1959), president of El Salvador, 1999–2004

== Sportspeople ==
=== Association football ===
- Francisco Pérez Durán, Spanish footballer
- Fran Pérez (footballer, born 1986), (Francisco Pérez Caso), Spanish football centre-back
- Fran Pérez (footballer, born 1992) (Francisco Pérez Gil), Spanish football midfielder
- Fran Pérez (footballer, born 2002) (Francisco Pérez Martínez), Spanish football winger

=== Other sports ===
- Francisco José Pérez (1920–1999), Spanish/Cuban chess player
- Francisco Pérez (cyclist) (1934–2024), Uruguayan Olympic cyclist
- Francisco Pérez (sport shooter) (born 1940), Spanish sports shooter
- Francisco Pérez (athlete) (born 1969), Paralympic athlete from Spain
- Francisco Pérez (diver) (born 1976), Mexican Olympic diver
- Francisco Pérez Sanchez (born 1978), Spanish road bicycle racer
- Francisco Pérez (baseball) (born 1997), baseball player
