= Narf =

Narf or NARF may refer to:

- Narf, a fictional creature; A sea nymph in the film Lady in the Water
- Native American Rights Fund, an American law firm
- Nuclear prelamin A recognition factor
- Narf (singer), the stage name of Galician singer Francisco Xavier Pérez Vázquez
- Narf, a character on Sesame Street; see List of Sesame Street Muppets
- Narf!, an interjection used by the cartoon character Pinky of Pinky and the Brain
