= Paco Pérez =

Paco Pérez is the name of:

- Paco Pérez (footballer), Spanish footballer
- Paco Pérez (musician), Guatemalan musician
