= Battle of Buena Vista =

1847 battle of the Mexican-American War

Coordinates: 25°20′13″N 101°2′47″W

- Part of the Mexican–American War
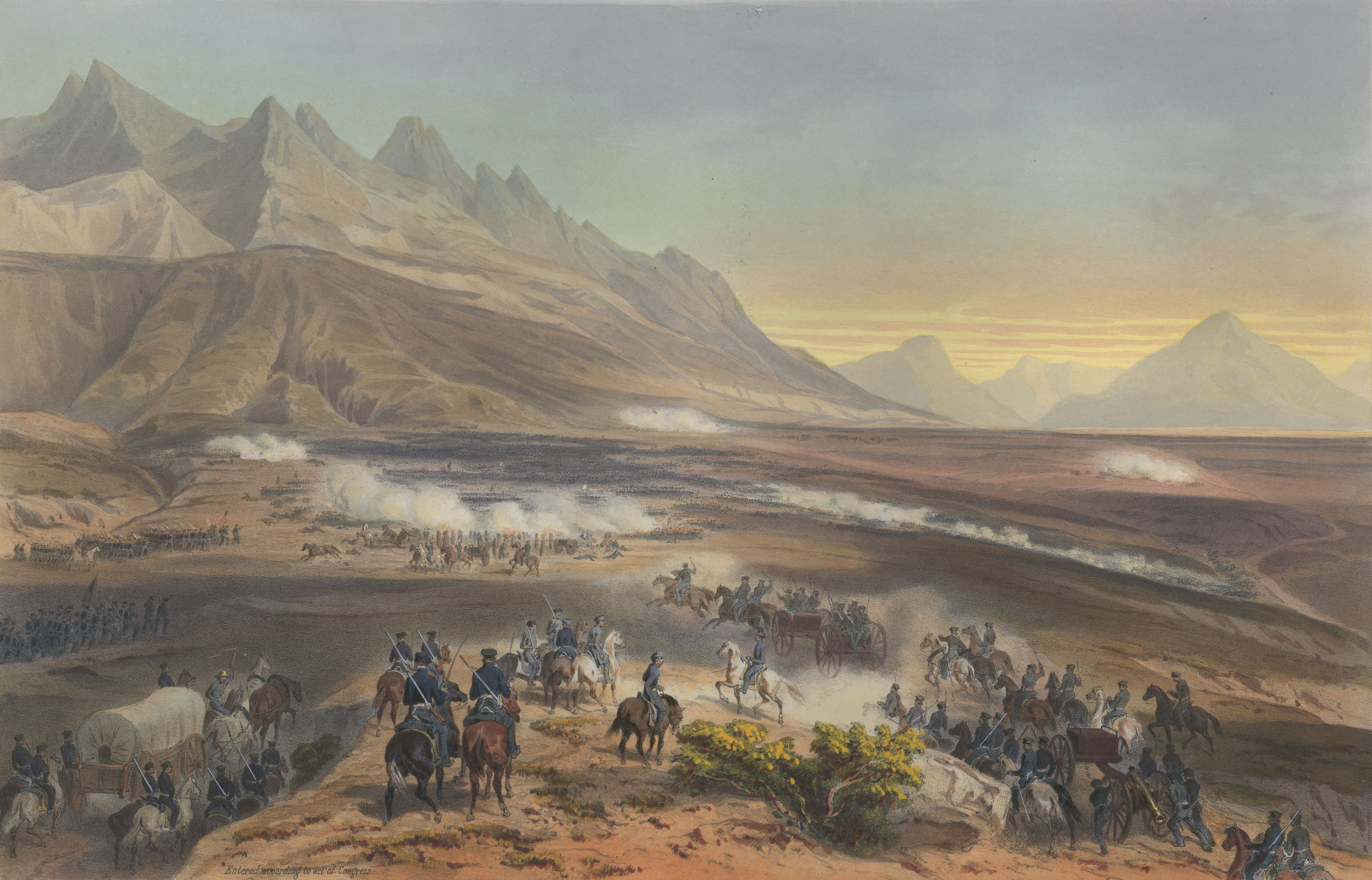
- Engraving of the battle by Adolphe Jean-Baptiste Bayot
Date	February 22–23, 1847
Location	Puerto de la Angostura, Coahuila
Result	Inconclusive

Belligerents
United States	Mexico

Commanders and leaders
Zachary Taylor; John E. Wool	Antonio López de Santa Anna; Pedro de Ampudia; Manuel María Lombardini (WIA)

Strength
4,594–4,750	15,142

Casualties and losses
267 killed 387 wounded 6 missing	591 killed 1,048 wounded 1,894 missing

The Battle of Buena Vista (February 22–23, 1847), known as the Battle of La Angostura in Mexico, and sometimes as Battle of Buena Vista/La Angostura, was a battle of the Mexican–American War. It was fought between U.S. forces, largely volunteers, under General Zachary Taylor, and the much larger Mexican Army under General Antonio López de Santa Anna. It took place near Buena Vista, a village in the state of Coahuila, about 12 km (7.5 mi) south of Saltillo, Mexico. La Angostura ("the narrow place") was the local name for the site. The outcome of this battle was unforeseeable: there were factors that could grant Mexicans a proper victory on the battlefield, despite the US overall superiority. After the first day "many Americans … believed that the American army would soon collapse when the fighting began the next day".

The outcome of the battle was ambiguous, with both sides claiming victory. Santa Anna's forces withdrew with war trophies of cannons and flags and left the field to the surprised U.S. forces, who had expected there to be another day of hard fighting. Yet the Mexican retreat was perceived in Mexico largely as an American victory, weakening Santa Anna politically and contributing to subsequent political turmoil between the conservative elites and the liberals.

== Background ==
U.S. president James K. Polk had decided that an invasion into central Mexico via the Gulf Coast port of Veracruz would make the Mexicans come to the negotiating table. He told Major General Zachary Taylor to stay in his position at Monterrey. Polk had placed General Winfield Scott as commander of all the U.S. forces in Mexico. Scott himself ordered Taylor to remain in place. After the Battle of Monterrey and the end of the armistice, Taylor's Army of Occupation with Brigadier General William J. Worth's 1,000 men advanced onto undefended Saltillo on November 16, despite orders to halt any movement further south, considering it strategic to cover the approaches to Monterrey and Parras de la Fuente. Taylor then directed General John E. Wool from Monclova to Parras, the objective being control of that agricultural area. Wool's force moved to Agua Nueva, south of Saltillo, on December 21, to counter rumors of impending attack. Scott had intelligence that the army of Santa Anna was getting into position to attack, just six miles from Taylor's position.

In mid-August 1846, General Antonio López de Santa Anna returned from exile and quickly assumed command of the Mexican Army, having tricked Polk into allowing him to return to Mexico, telling him that he could reconcile Mexico to make peace with the U.S. He reached San Luis Potosí on October 8 with a force of 20,000 men and 5,000 women (soldaderas). This was a significant force, but some troops had no uniforms or weapons. In general, Mexican forces had large numbers but had far fewer resources than those of the U.S., with outdated weapons, inability to pay its troops, and inability to consistently provision its forces, since there was no money to pay local civilians. Most troops were new recruits, and most had not fired a single weapon in training. However, Santa Anna had the advantage of knowing the territory since the Mexican army had often used the main route.

In early January while encamped in San Luis de Potosí, Santa Anna acquired a letter from General Scott ordering Worth's troops to join General David E. Twiggs and General John A. Quitman's divisions in Veracruz, prompting Santa Anna to make attack plans for Saltillo. General José de Urrea's cavalry would simultaneously retake Ciudad Victoria and cut off Monterrey from the port of Matamoros, Tamaulipas. Santa Anna's army departed San Luis Potosí on January 27 with a force of 21,553, and reached Encarnación, south of Saltillo, with 15,142 men on February 20. General Miñon surprised a group of 100 U.S. troops at Encarnación, and took them captive. Their capture cheered the Mexican troops. The winter weather was against the poorly dressed and provisioned Mexicans, with the coldest temperatures in decades. The men and women in Santa Anna's forces began to die of exposure, and thirst once the cold weather lifted was also a problem. Some soldaderas set fire to trees around the encamped troops to warm them, but by the time the two armies fought, the Mexican forces had already lost thousands to illness, exposure, and desertion.

Taylor moved 4,650 of his men to Agua Nueva on February 14, but on February 20, Major Benjamin McCulloch's Texas Rangers encountered Santa Anna's force at Encarnación, prompting Taylor's withdrawal to La Angostura ("the narrow place"), a mile and a quarter south of Hacienda San Juan de la Buena Vista. General Wool was charged with selecting "the field of battle" and making "such dispositions of the troops on the arrival of the enemy" as he deemed necessary. Wool thought the site excellent for defense, since the road passed through a narrow valley here, which was crossed at right angles by several ravines east of the road and arroyos were to the west. Wool placed Captain John M. Washington's battery across the road, supported by the 1st Illinois under Colonel John J. Hardin and 2nd Kentucky under Colonel William R. McKee. Continuing to the left was the 2nd Illinois under Colonel William H. Bissell, General Joseph Lane's Indiana Brigade, and the Kentucky and Arkansas horsemen, with two squadrons of dragoons and a company of Texans in reserve.

Santa Anna's forces consisted of Major General Manuel María Lombardini's division and Major General Francisco Pacheco's division in the center with 14 pieces of artillery, Colonel Santiago Blanco's regiment of engineers, and three 16-pounders on the left, and Major General Pedro de Ampudia's light infantry with General Julián Juvera's strong cavalry brigade on the right with two batteries. In reserve was Major General José María Ortega's infantry division and Brigadier General Francisco Mejia's brigade.

== Battle ==
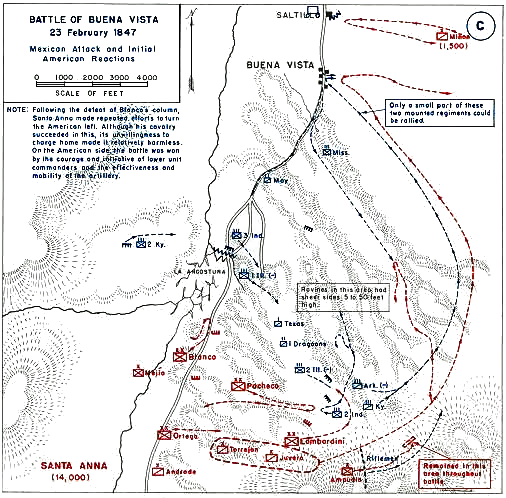
Map of the Battle of Buena Vista

Santa Anna had chosen the day of battle, not apparently aware that it was George Washington's birthday, which galvanized patriotic sentiment among the U.S. forces. "A more inopportune moment could not have been selected by the Mexican general." A captured U.S. soldier said the Mexicans found it hard to believe that General Washington had not been leading the troops himself, but had been dead for nearly fifty years.

Santa Anna had advanced to Carnero Pass below Agua Nueva on February 21 and on February 22 demanded Taylor's surrender, to which Taylor's aide, William Wallace Smith Bliss, replied, "I beg leave to say that I decline acceding to your request."

Santa Anna began the attack with a feint by Mejía to the American right, but his main thrust was to the American left. Wool moved three companies of Kentucky cavalry under Colonel Humphrey Marshall and four rifle companies of the Arkansas regiment under Colonel John S. Roane and four companies of Hoosiers under Major Willis A. Gorman to strengthen his left. Marshall and Ampudia's men skirmished by 3:30 pm, but darkness brought an end to the fighting.

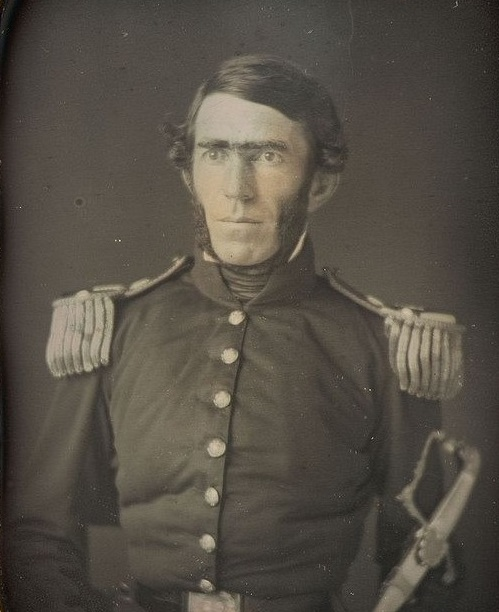
Lieutenant Colonel Braxton Bragg, around the time of the Mexican War

After dark, Taylor, escorted by the Mississippi Rifles, Colonel Jefferson Davis, and Charles A. May's dragoons, checked on the Saltillo garrison, but returned by 9:00 am on February 23. During the night, Brigadier General Manuel Micheltorena moved five 8-pounders above the American left, intending to flank them along the high ground the next morning at daylight.

Ampudia's brigade started the assault, supported by Lombardini and Pacheco's divisions, while Moras demonstrated against the American right. The 2nd Indiana faced a force of 7,000 Mexicans, prompting Wool to send the 2nd Illinois and Captain Thomas W. Sherman's battery in support.

The Hoosiers, after taking 90 casualties, broke and fled, forcing the 2nd Illinois into a slow fighting withdrawal, and Marshall's men to flee northward to the Buena Vista hacienda. Juvera's cavalry was able to turn the American left flank and head for Buena Vista.

Davis' Mississippians were ordered to shield Buena Vista along with the volunteers of the Arkansas and Kentucky cavalry, the 3rd Indiana, and Captain Enoch Steen's dragoons. A large Mexican force routed the cavalry, killing Archibald Yell, and then reached the hacienda of Buena Vista. They had expected the building to be full of provisions, but instead they were dismayed to find that U.S. troops taking refuge in it were persuaded by their officers to defend it. The Mexican forces withdrew, pursued by U.S. Dragoons.

Steen's dragoons were able to split Juvera's column, forcing the advance portion past the hacienda and under fire from Sherman's battery, while the dragoons threw the rest into confusion. Davis' men then sent the Mexicans fleeing, although Davis was wounded in the heel.

Major John Munroe organized the defense of the hacienda proper, using the 2nd Indiana, from Juvera's attacks, while the Mississippians and the 3rd Indiana were organized into a large "V" which forced Juvera's approximately 2,000 survivors into a ravine. A young Mexican lieutenant, José María Montoya, tricked Taylor into a ceasefire, allowing the trapped Mexicans enough time to escape. Brigadier José Vicente Miñón appeared before Saltillo but retreated to the southwest.

Santa Anna renewed an attack on the main U.S. position led by General Francisco Pérez with artillery support. They were met at 5:00 p.m. by fire from O'Brien and Thomas's guns and two Illinois and a Kentucky regiment under Colonel John J. Hardin, during which Hardin was killed.

An artillery battery under Captain Braxton Bragg then arrived with orders to "maintain the position at all costs". Taylor rode over to Bragg, and after a brief conversation in which Bragg replied he was using single canister shot, Taylor ordered "double-shot your guns and give 'em hell, Bragg". Later, this order, although misquoted as "give them a little more grape, Captain Bragg", would be used as a campaign slogan that carried Taylor into the White House. Pérez's attack was repelled and the fighting ended as heavy rain fell over the field. On the battlefield, camp follower and heroine of Fort Brown, Sarah A. Bowman, known as the "Great Western", ministered to American troops, including "bolstering the nerves of the soldiers."

Santa Anna believed his army was on the verge of exhaustion and collapse, due to lack of provisions. Some Mexican soldiers were so driven by hunger that they "conducted unauthorized attacks just so they could take food from the Americans". In assessing whether to hold the field or withdraw, Santa Anna calculated that the lack of provisions would drive many of his men to desertion. On February 23, some of Santa Anna's council of war at Agua Nueva advised withdrawal, while others argued that cattle could be driven there to provision the soldiers. Those that argued for remaining thought that with one more day of fighting, the Mexicans would achieve a complete victory. However, the decision was to withdraw to Agua Nueva, and they left their campfires ablaze to confuse the U.S. troops. Taylor led his army back to Nueva Agua, but he did not pursue Santa Anna any further south.

Many U.S. Volunteers going into battle with Mexican forces held Mexicans to be their racial inferiors and poor soldiers. These soldiers were often unbelieving, but "learned after Monterey and Buena Vista to respect the fighting qualities of the Mexican soldier".

== Immediate aftermath ==
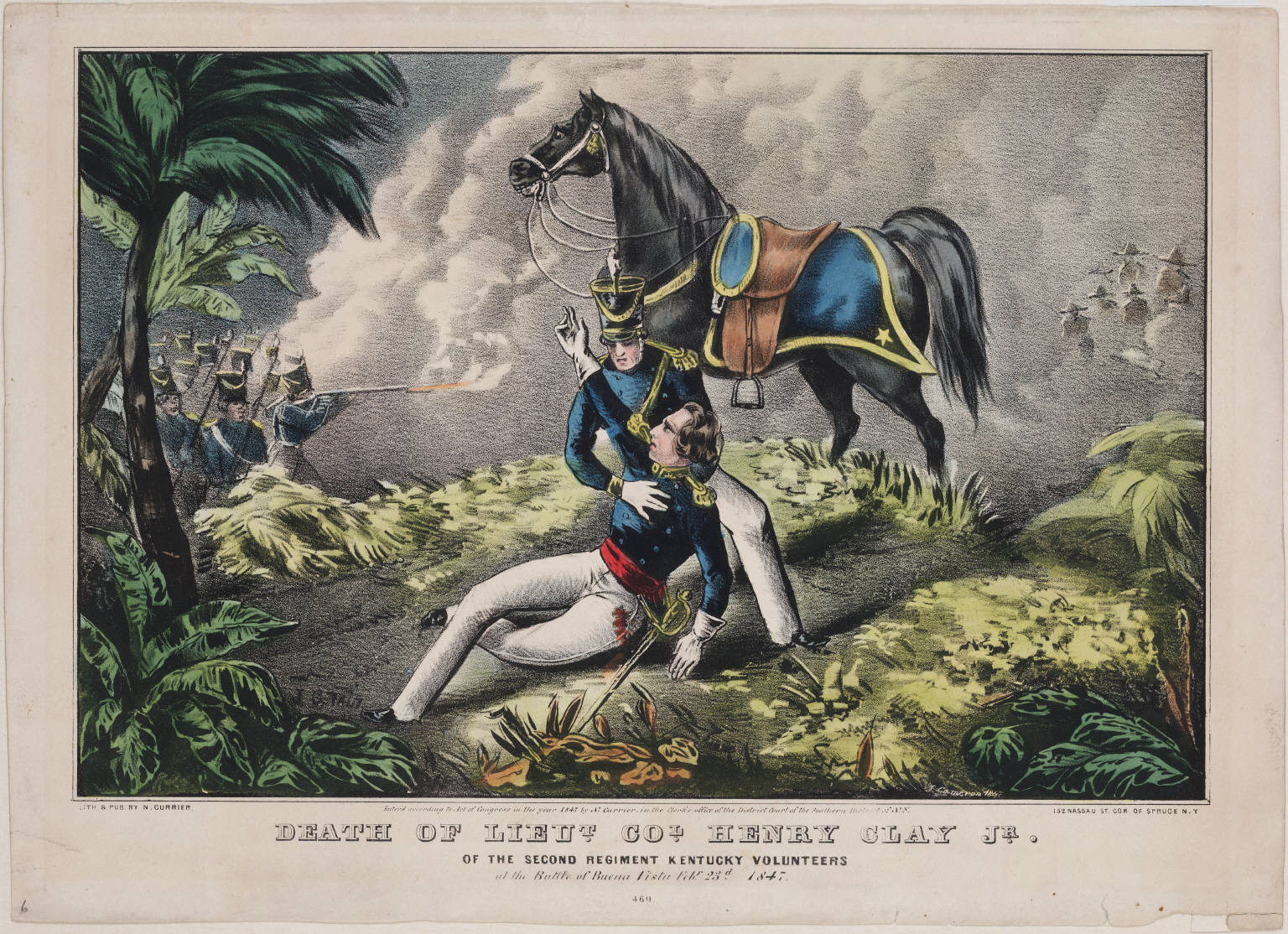
Death of Lieut. Col. Henry Clay Jr. lithograph by N. Currier. Courtesy of the Beinecke Rare Book & Manuscript Library, Yale University.

Santa Anna withdrew his troops, leaving the battlefield to the surprised U.S. forces. Santa Anna's forces had captured important war trophies from the U.S. Army, cannons and flags, as well as arms, which remained on display into the modern era at the Artillery School of Mexico. In the account written by Mexicans in the immediate aftermath of the 1848 Treaty of Guadalupe Hidalgo ending the war, they considered the battle a victory. "On our part, the army was proclaimed victorious, alleging in proof the trophies captured, the positions taken, and the [U.S.] divisions vanquished. The truth is, our arms routed the Americans in all the encounters, and so far the issue of the battle is favorable to us. There had been three partial triumphs, but not a complete victory." There were serious losses of Mexican dead and wounded.

Recovery of the bodies of the U.S. dead was a phenomenon of this conflict. The most famous from Buena Vista/La Angostura was that of Henry Clay Jr., the third son of American statesman Henry Clay, a vociferous opponent of the Mexican War. His death was the subject of at least seven prints by Currier and Ives, and Neale and Pate, and others. The Currier and Ives print depicts him shortly after being wounded, urging his comrades to leave him to his fate. The grave site became well known, with two surviving daguerreotypes recording it at different times of the day and from different angles. Clay's body was disinterred and transported to the U.S. for burial by Jefferson Davis. Also killed were Archibald Yell, former governor of Arkansas, and John J. Hardin of Illinois, a Whig political rival of Abraham Lincoln. In addition to the U.S. battlefield casualties there were an "incredible...1,500 U.S. desertion[s]" from the battle. The state of Kentucky paid for the retrieval and transport of some officers and enlisted men, who were subsequently buried in a common grave near the Kentucky State House in the capital Frankfort. There was a large public funeral on July 20, 1847, honoring the sacrifices of the dead Kentuckians, with John C. Breckinridge praising them. Breckinridge had been an opponent of the war, but volunteered shortly after his own patriotic speech.

== Public reaction in the U.S. ==
News of the battle in the U.S. was not immediate, with communications from Mexico slow because the battle took place in a relatively remote inland area of northern Mexico. There were initial rumors that the Mexicans had carried the day and captured Taylor. Reliable news did not reach New Orleans until mid-March and New York City on April 1. Once the news broke, it entered the national consciousness and there was an outpouring of praise in poetry, prose, music, and art. Poet Walt Whitman joined in the praise. Since the American forces were largely volunteers rather than regular army, it increased Buena Vista's popularity in the public imagination. The volunteers were characterized as raw citizen-soldiers who had defeated the far larger Mexican army, seen as a professional military force.

Simultaneous with Buena Vista was Scott's landing at Veracruz, to push into the Mexican heartland and take the capital. When news did arrive, it was characterized as a glorious victory of a small and intrepid U.S. army against the far larger force of Mexicans. Taylor's hard-fought victory at Buena Vista overshadowed Scott's successful taking of Veracruz after a lengthy bombardment that produced few American casualties, but many Mexican civilian casualties.

== Written accounts and images ==
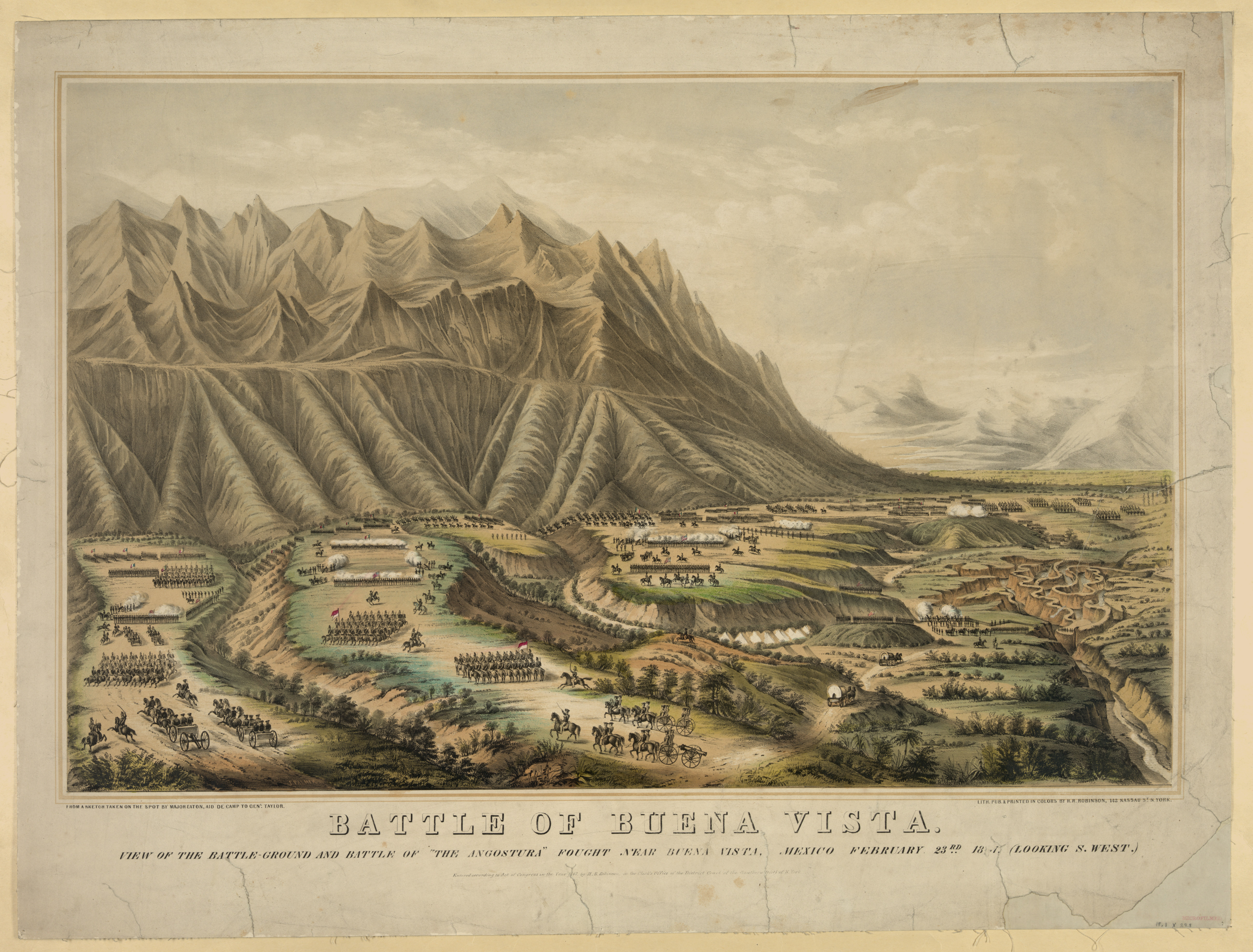
Battle of Buena Vista, taken from a sketch by Major Eaton

There were a number of contemporaneous or nearly contemporaneous accounts of the battle on both sides of the conflict. Captain James Henry Carleton fought at Buena Vista and remained in the area in the occupation forces. During his time he revisited the battlefield and set down remembrances of the combat. There were other soldier accounts, including George C. Furber's Twelve Months Volunteer; Benjamin Franklin Scribner, and Samuel French also published accounts of their participation. Lieutenant Lew Wallace was not present at the battle, but visited the battle ground a few days later, writing a vivid account of sight and smell. "There the wrecks lay in awful significance--dead men and horses, bayonets, accoutrements, broken muskets, hats, caps, cartridge paper, fragments of clothing. the earth and rocks were in places black with blood, here splotch, there a little rill." He also noted the large pit graves of fallen soldiers of both sides.

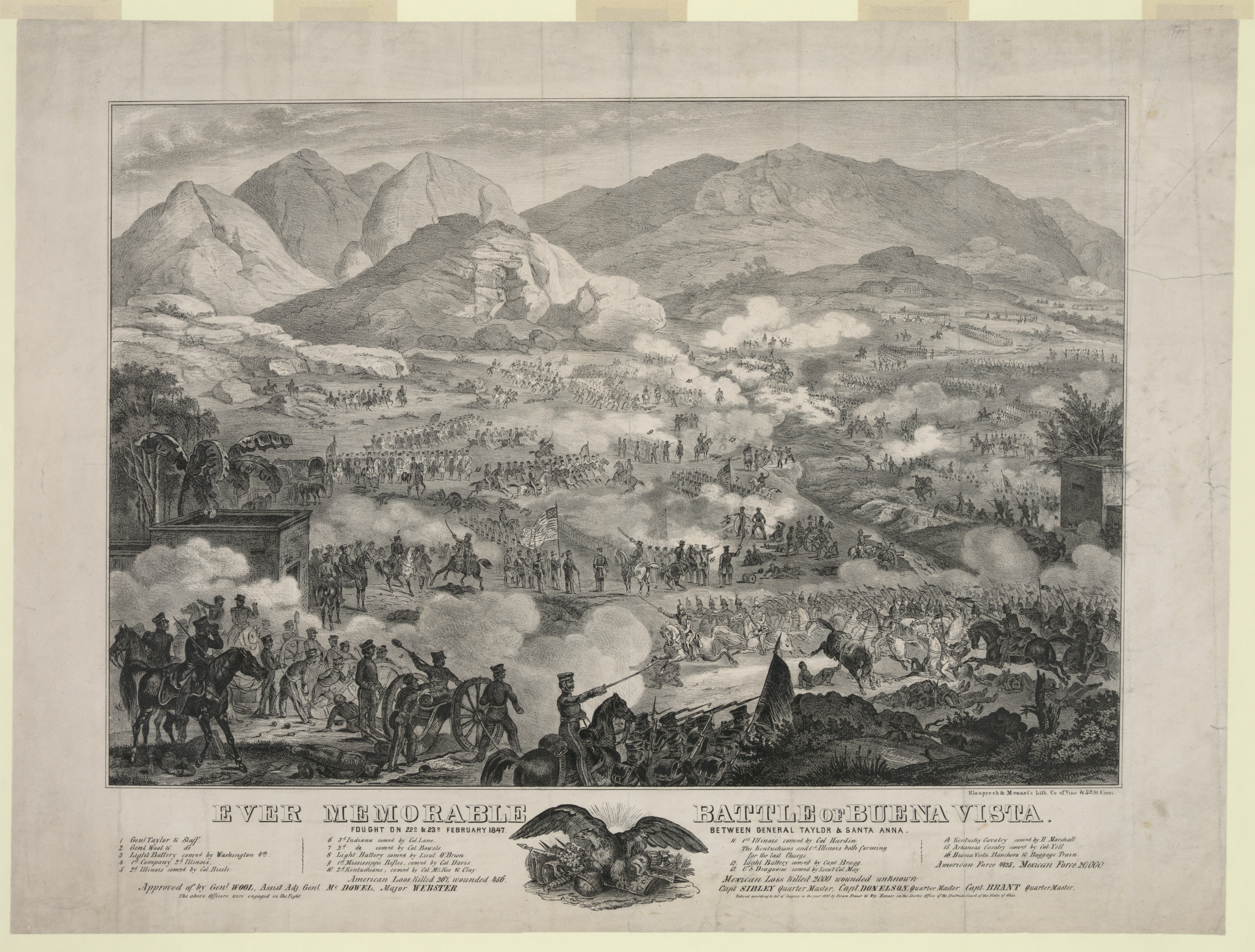
Ever memorable Battle of Buena Vista. Lithograph. 1847. Klauprecht & Menzel.

A great many images of the battle were produced for public consumption in the U.S., the most famous of which is the scene of battle done from a sketch by Taylor's aide-de-camp, Major Eaton. Eaton made notes of the battlefield, recorded the topography, and queried other battle participants. The published battle scene was large, (19 1/4 inches x 29 1/4 inches; 48.9 x 74.9 cm.). It was offered for sale to the public on September 15, 1847, while the war continued. In contemporary accounts, it was praised for its accuracy concerning the topography as well as its beauty. A modern assessment of the battle scene points to the inconsistencies common among battle scenes; that is, the reduction of troop numbers and oversimplification of movement. Many images depict the fierce nature of the combat and the captions of some of the images seek to highlight the valor of particular troops and asserting the U.S. victory. Carl Nebel's painting is part of a series he did, documenting battles of the war, illustrating journalist George Wilkins Kendall's The War Between the United States and Mexico, Illustrated, but Kendall did not visit the Buena Vista battle ground, and likely neither did Nebel. Kendall credited Carleton's account of Captain John P. O'Brien's holding the U.S. line and control of the guns. Nebel does not credit Eaton's lithograph of the battle scene.

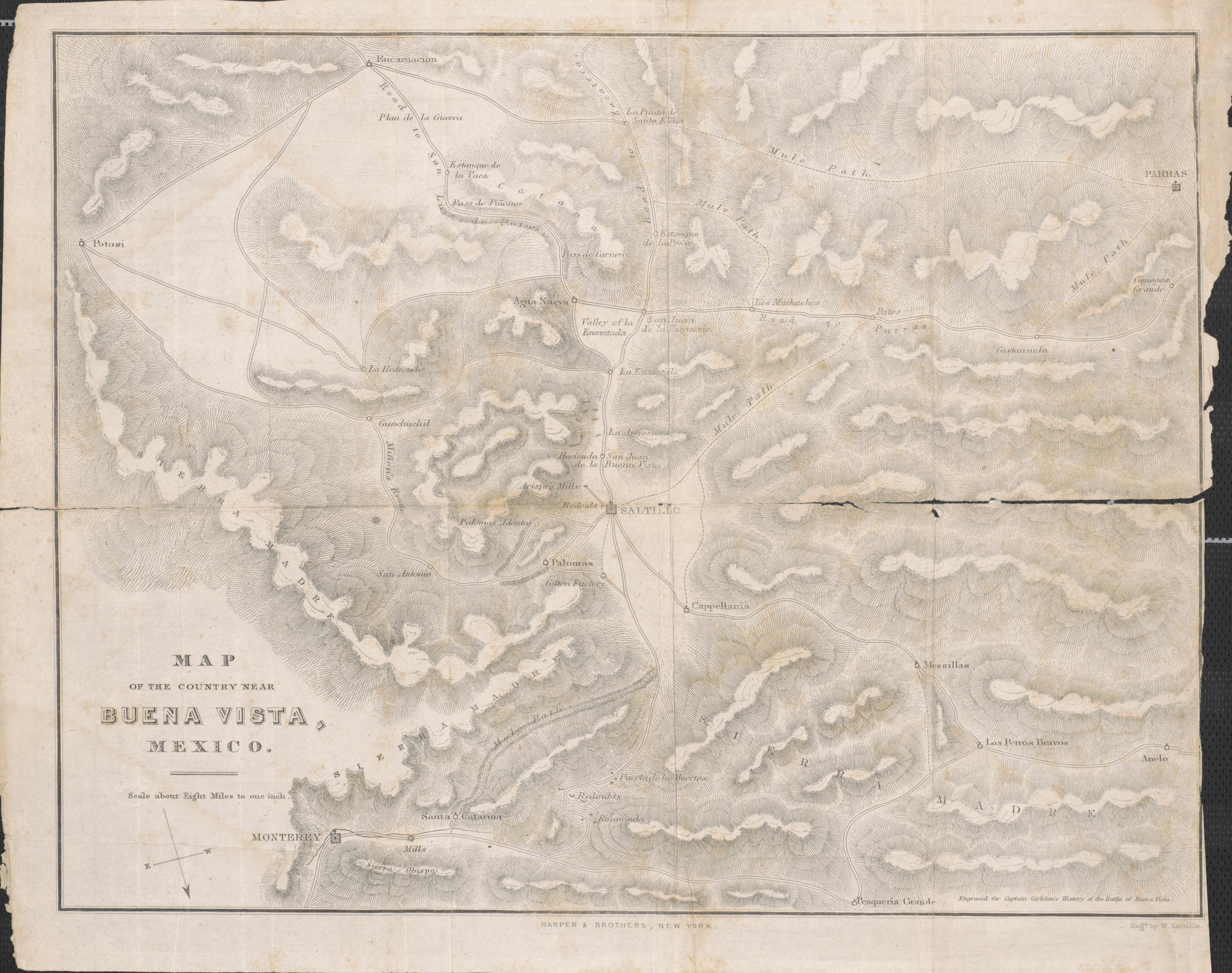
Map of the country near Buena Vista, Mexico, William Kemble and James Henry Carleton

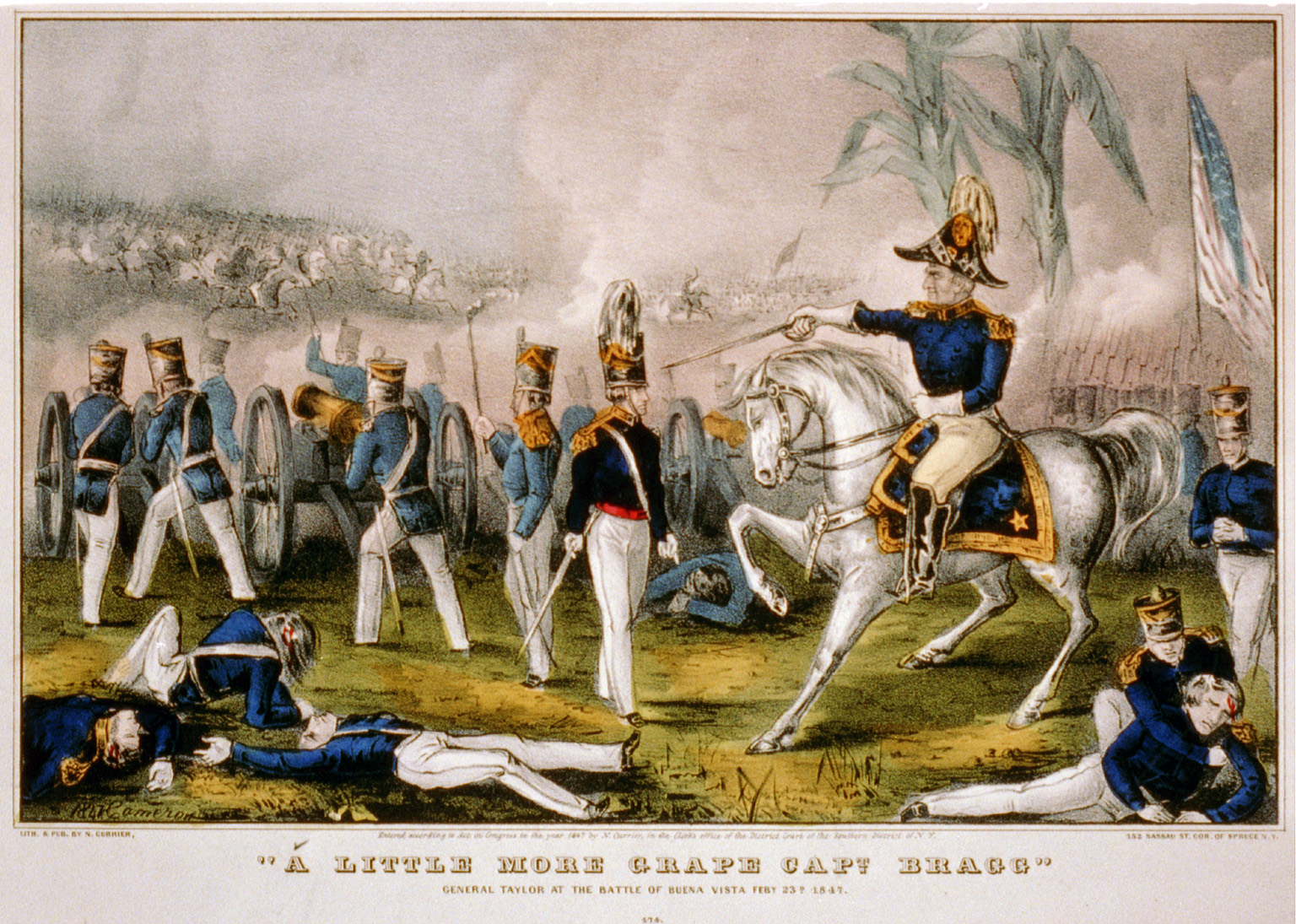
A little more grape Capt. Bragg - General Taylor at the Battle of Buena Vista, Feby 23d, 1847. Lithograph. Currier.

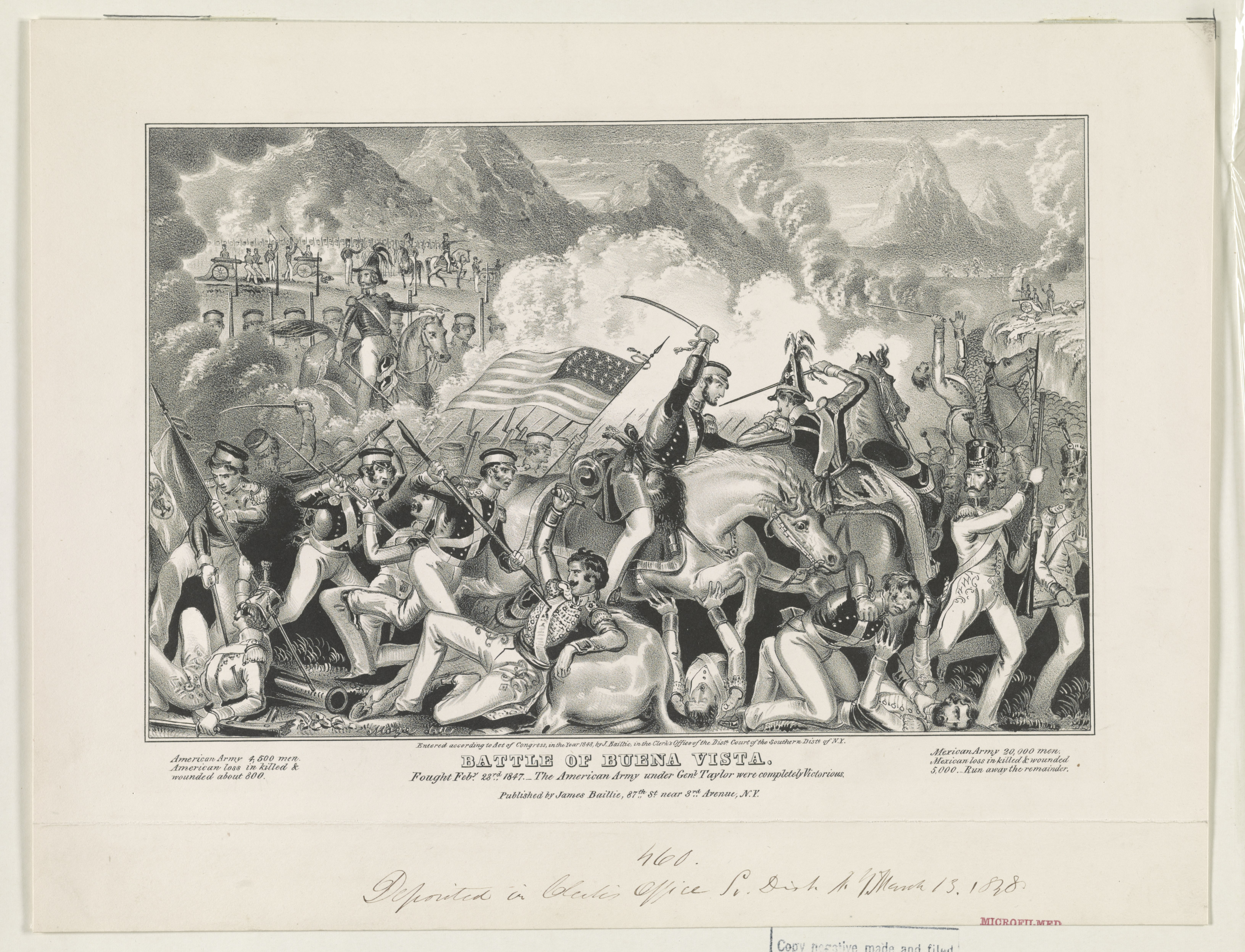
Battle of Buena Vista.

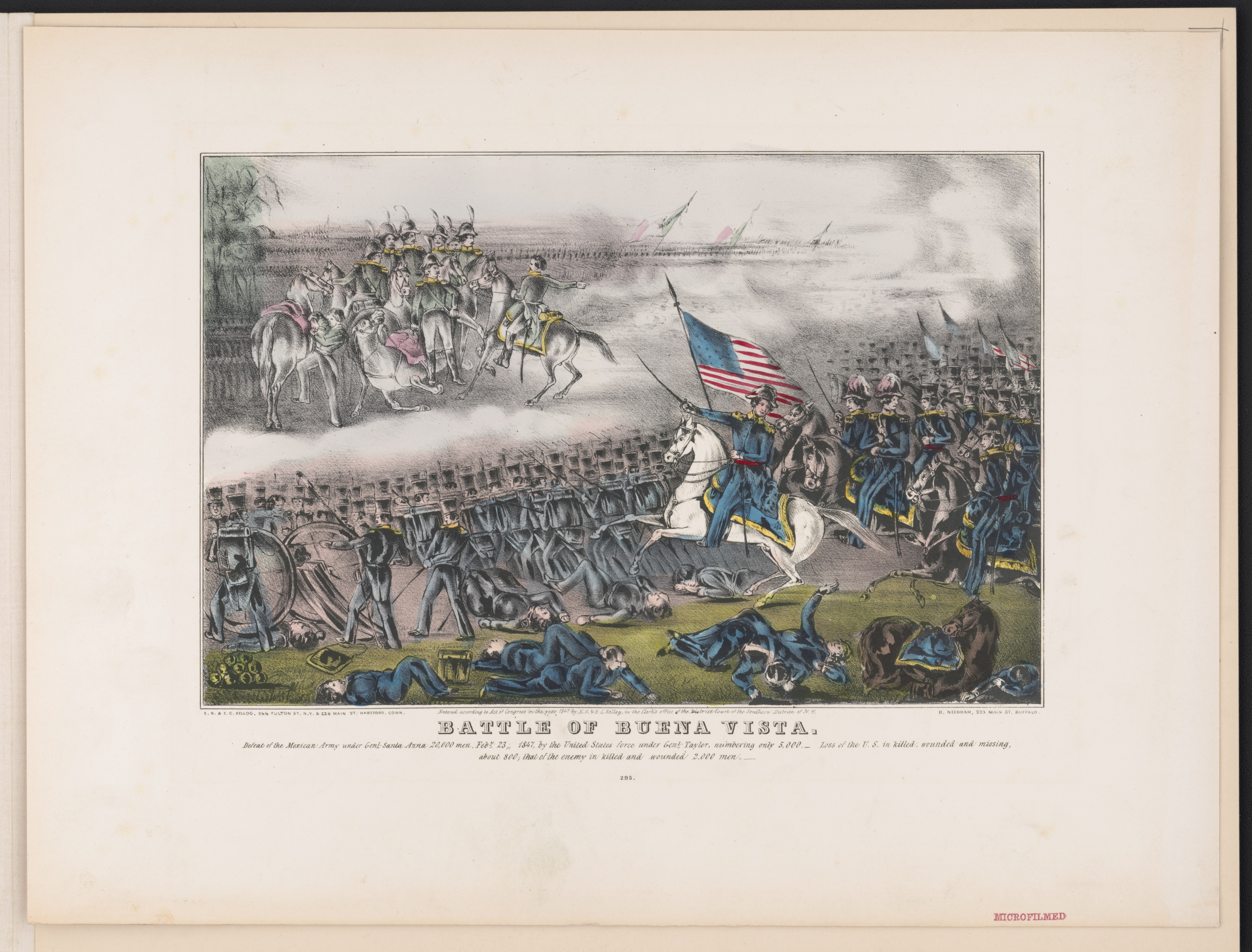
Battle of Buena Vista.

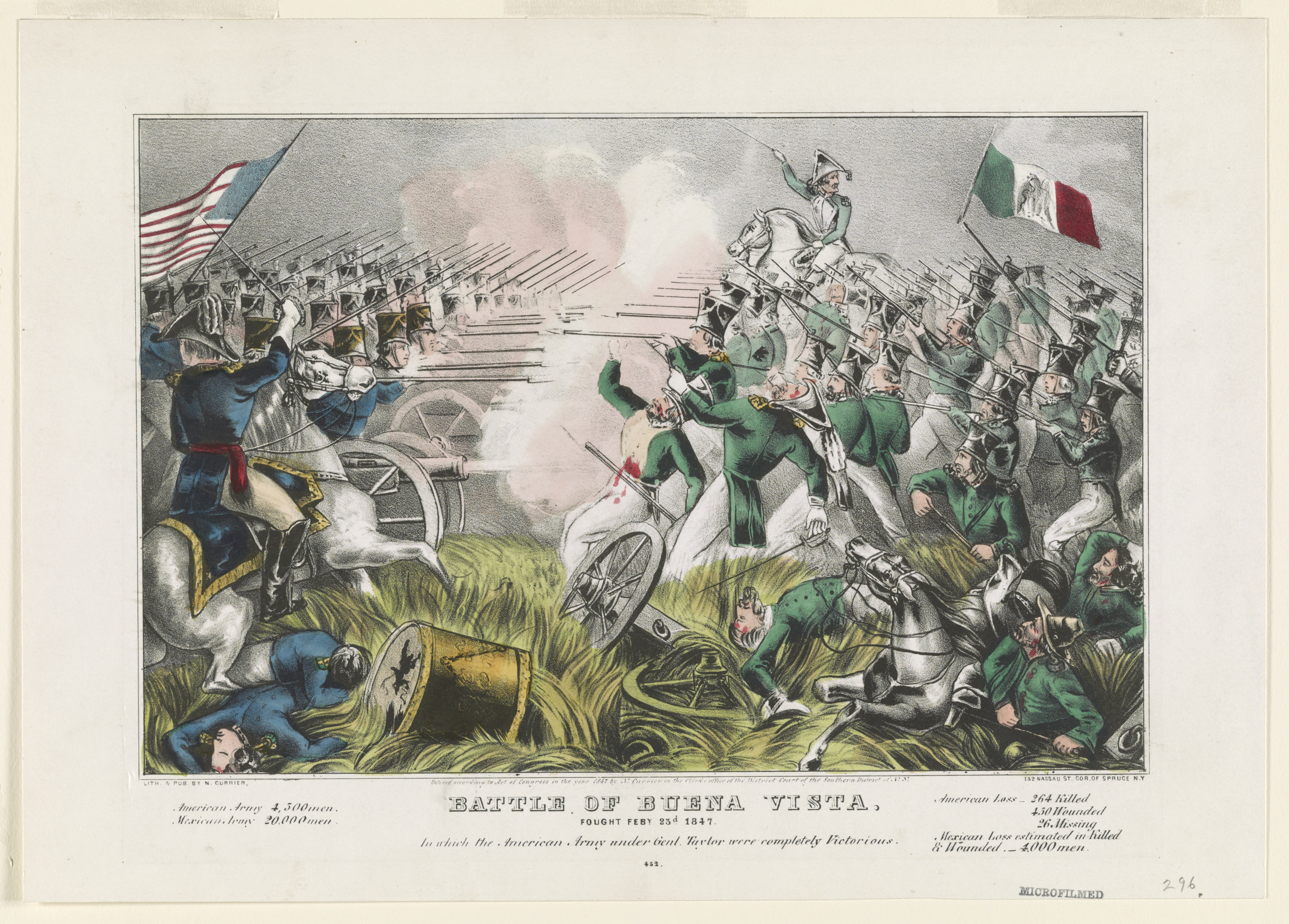
Battle of Buena Vista

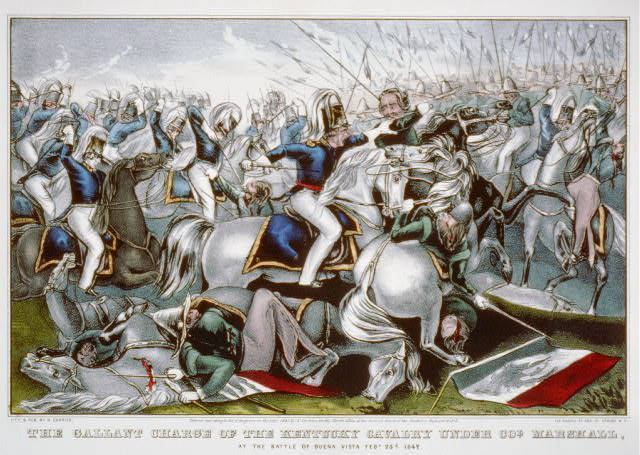
The Gallant Charge of the Kentucky Cavalry under Col. Marshall

Gallant charge of the Kentuckians at the Battle of Buena Vista, and complete defeat of the Mexicans

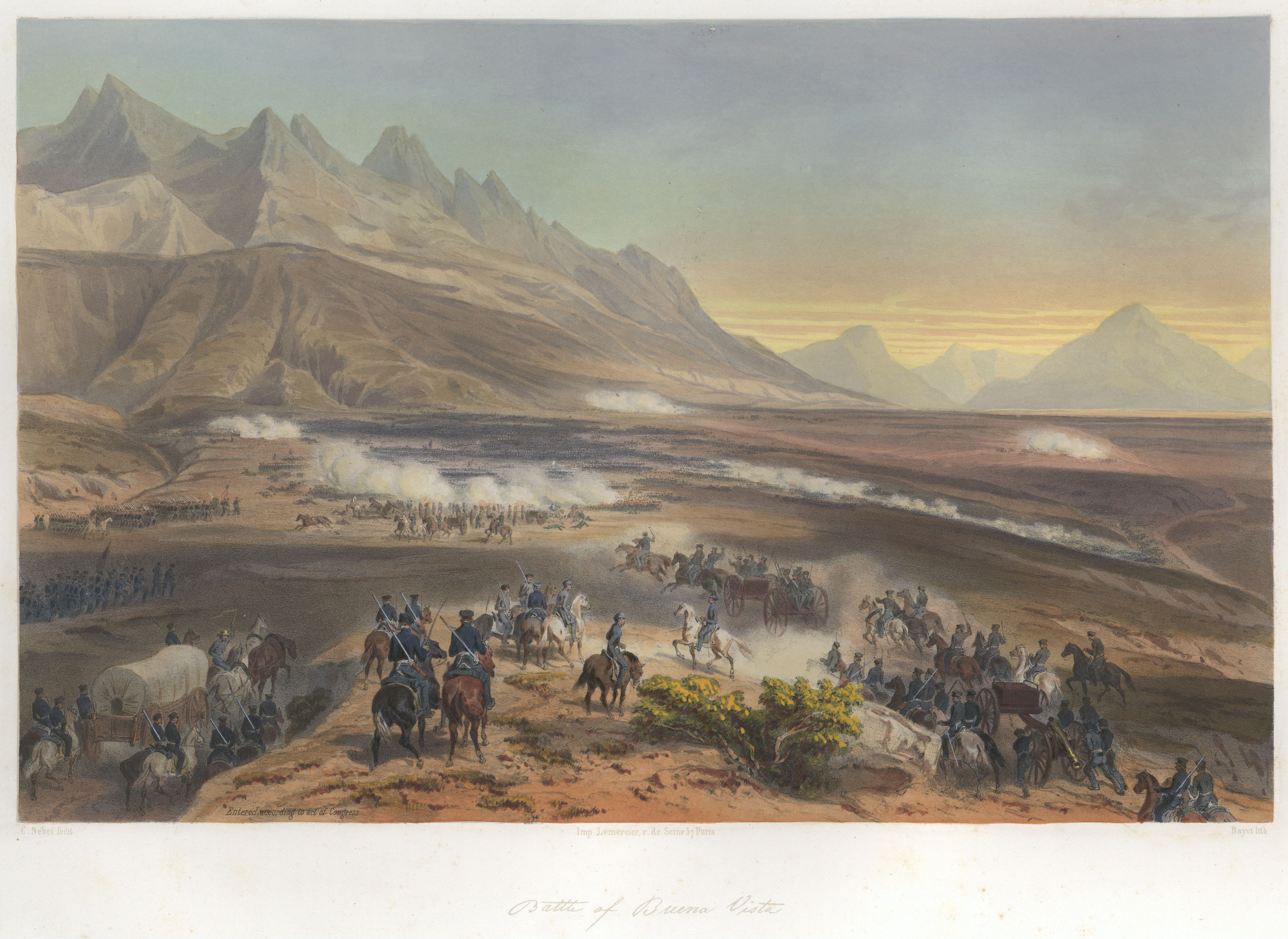
Carl Nebel, Battle of Buena Vista

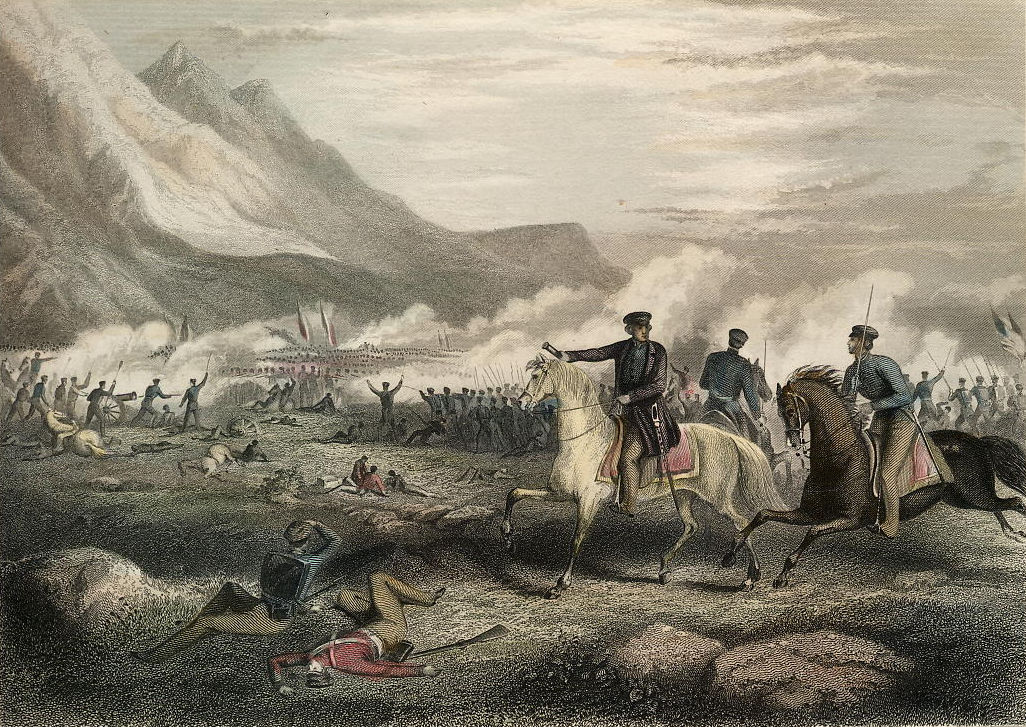
Battle of Buena Vista.

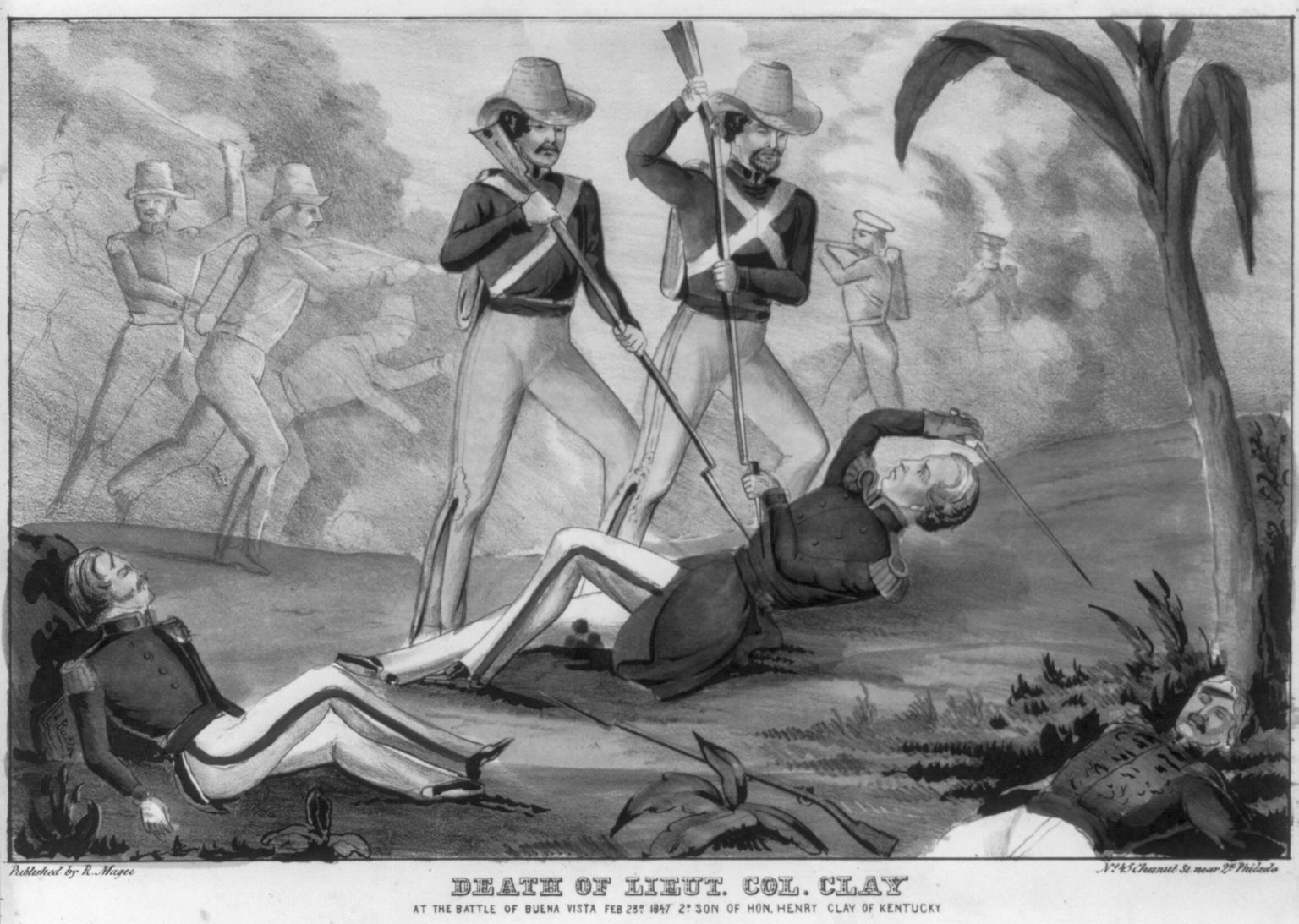
Death of Henry Clay Jr.

Plan of the Battle of Buena Vista 1847. American troops are represented in order of battle on the morning of the 23rd.

== Place names ==
Buena Vista County, Iowa, in 1859, was named in honor of the battle, as were Buena Vista Township, in Michigan's Saginaw County, and the cities of Buena Vista, Virginia; of Buena Vista, Kentucky; Buena Vista, Colorado; Buena Vista, Oregon; Buena Vista, New Jersey; Buena Vista, Alabama; Buena Vista, Mississippi; Buena Vista, Pennsylvania; and Buena Vista, Georgia. Buena Vista Park in San Francisco is also named after the battle.

== See also ==
- Battles of the Mexican–American War
- Battle of Monterrey
- List of conflicts in the United States
- Mexican–American War
- Saint Patrick's Battalion

== Notes ==
- Note 1 Balbontin in La Invasion... lists the infantry battalions on p. 56, the O.B. of Pacheco Division on p. 64, the infantry bde. commanders on p. 64, 67 & 68, the artillery organization on p. 60, 61, etc., the losses on p. 91-93.
- Note 2 Ramsey in The Other Side gives the strength figures in this article on p. 94–95.
- Note 3 Santa Ana in his Apelación gives strength at Saltillo at end Jan as: Engr Regt 362, Artillery 456, Infantry 13,877, Cavalry 4,830, Totals 19,525. At Encarnación Feb 19: Engr Regiment 292, Artillery same 456, Infantry 10,153, Cavalry 4,241, Totals 15,152. pp 66–67.
