= Carl Nebel =

German painter

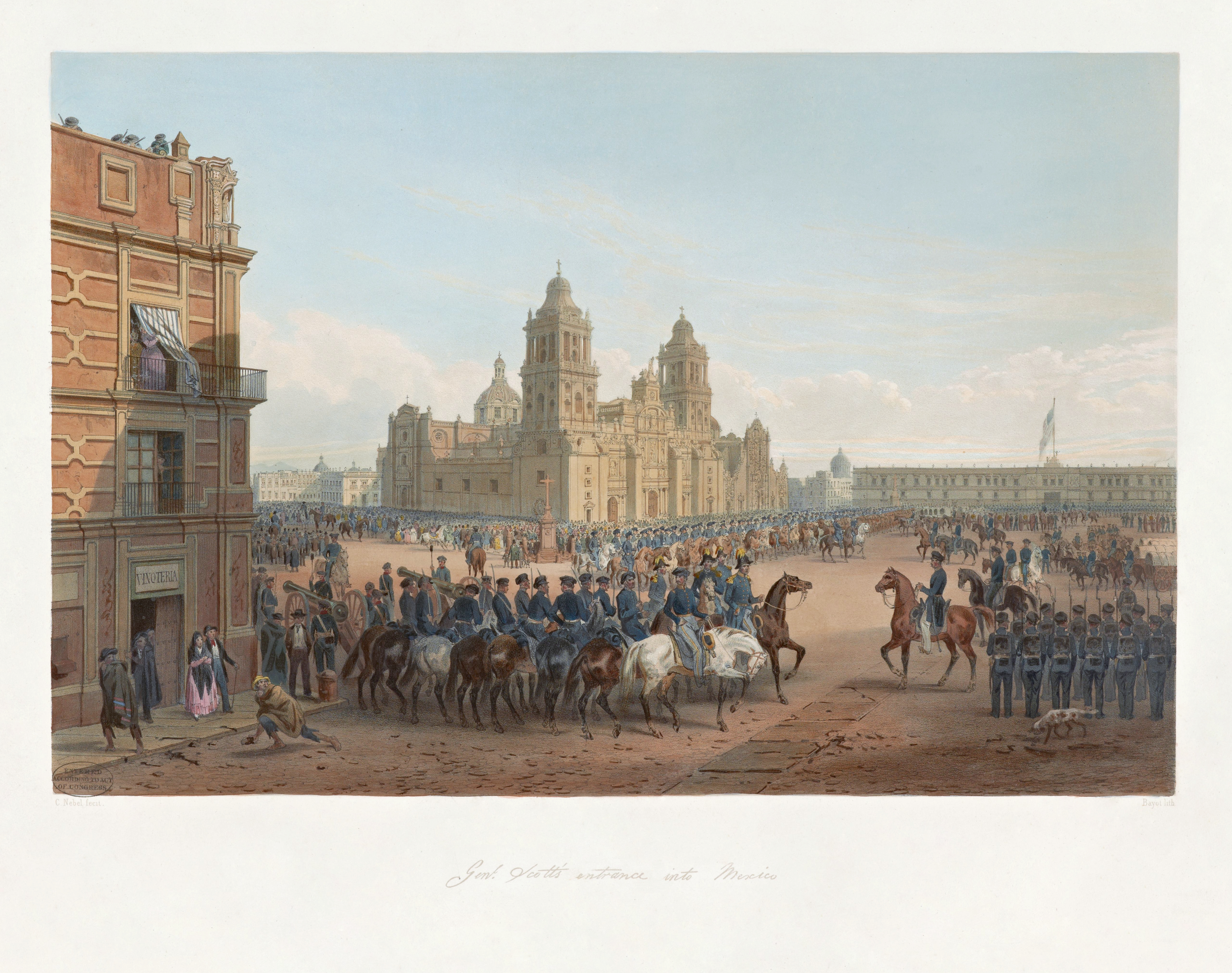
Scott's Entry to the Plaza de la Constitución

Carl Nebel (18 March 1805 – 4 June 1855) was a German engineer, architect and draughtsman, best known for his detailed paintings and lithographic prints made from them of the Mexican landscape and people during the battles of the Mexican–American War.

== Biography ==
Nebel was born in Altona, today a part of Hamburg. After studies in Hamburg and Paris, he travelled to America, where he was a resident of Mexico from 1829 until 1834. In 1836, he published in Paris his renowned illustrated work on that country—Voyage pittoresque et archéologique dans la partie la plus intéressante du Méxique, with 50 lithographs made from his paintings, twenty of which were hand-colored, and an introduction by Alexander von Humboldt.

In 1851, he published together with journalist George Wilkins Kendall some of his paintings of the events of the Mexican–American War in the book The War between the United States and Mexico Illustrated. Kendall had been a war correspondent and saw the opportunity to publish a major account of the war. The two came to an agreement to collaborate as the war was ending, Kendall having apparently been familiar with Nebel's earlier work. While Kendall went to Paris to cover events in 1848, Nebel remained in Mexico for an unknown length of time to complete the initial sketches for the book's illustrations. Nebel had returned to Hamburg, and Kendall chafed at the slowness of completion of the project, but it was completed in 1850 and published in 1851. The book contained twelve color lithographs done by Adolphe Jean-Baptiste Bayot and was printed by Joseph-Rose Lemercier, a leading lithographer. In both cases, Nebel's illustrations were enhanced by his making use of the newest printing developments in France, especially techniques for adding color to the prints. The prints from the Mexican war series were distributed in several different formats, as a single print, as a set of 12, a portfolio with text, and in the bound, folio-sized book.

The most famous in the Mexican war series is his depiction of General Winfield Scott's 1847 entry to the main square Zócalo of Mexico City, with the U.S. flag flying over the National Palace. It is almost identical to his illustration done a decade and a half before. The war scene Nebel presents is closer to the reality on the ground, where the conquering U.S. forces were not welcomed by the resident population, particularly by a street person (lépero) about to hurl a rock at the invaders. Although Kendall's text and Nebel's illustrations attempt to be true to the accounts of battle, there is no evidence that either one was at the Battle of Buena Vista, located in a remote part of northern Mexico. Kendall was a correspondent and saw the Battle of Molino del Rey, but Nebel was not. The battle is often not depicted in contemporary illustrations, but Nebel did two different views of it.

== Gallery ==
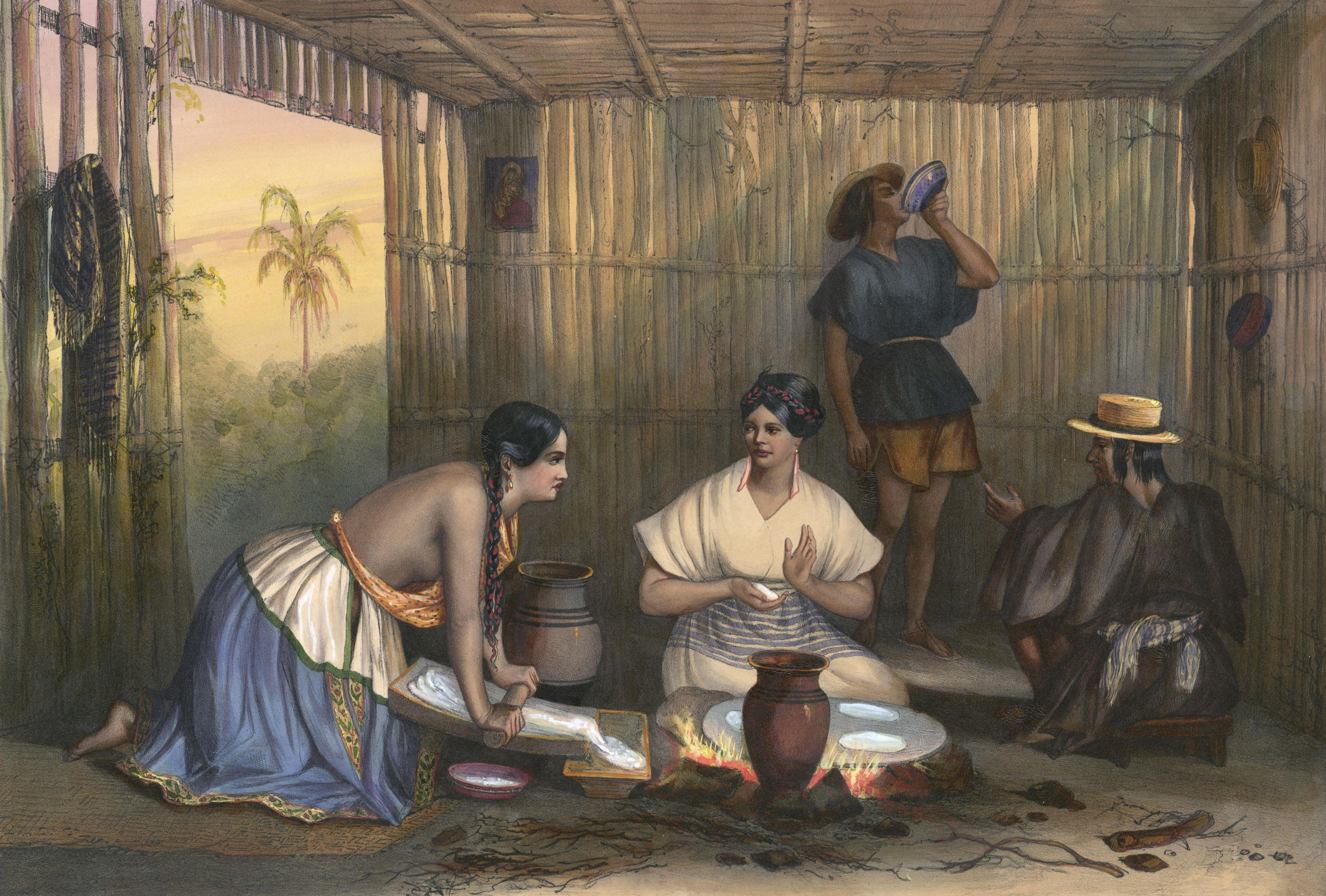
Las Tortilleras, published 1836

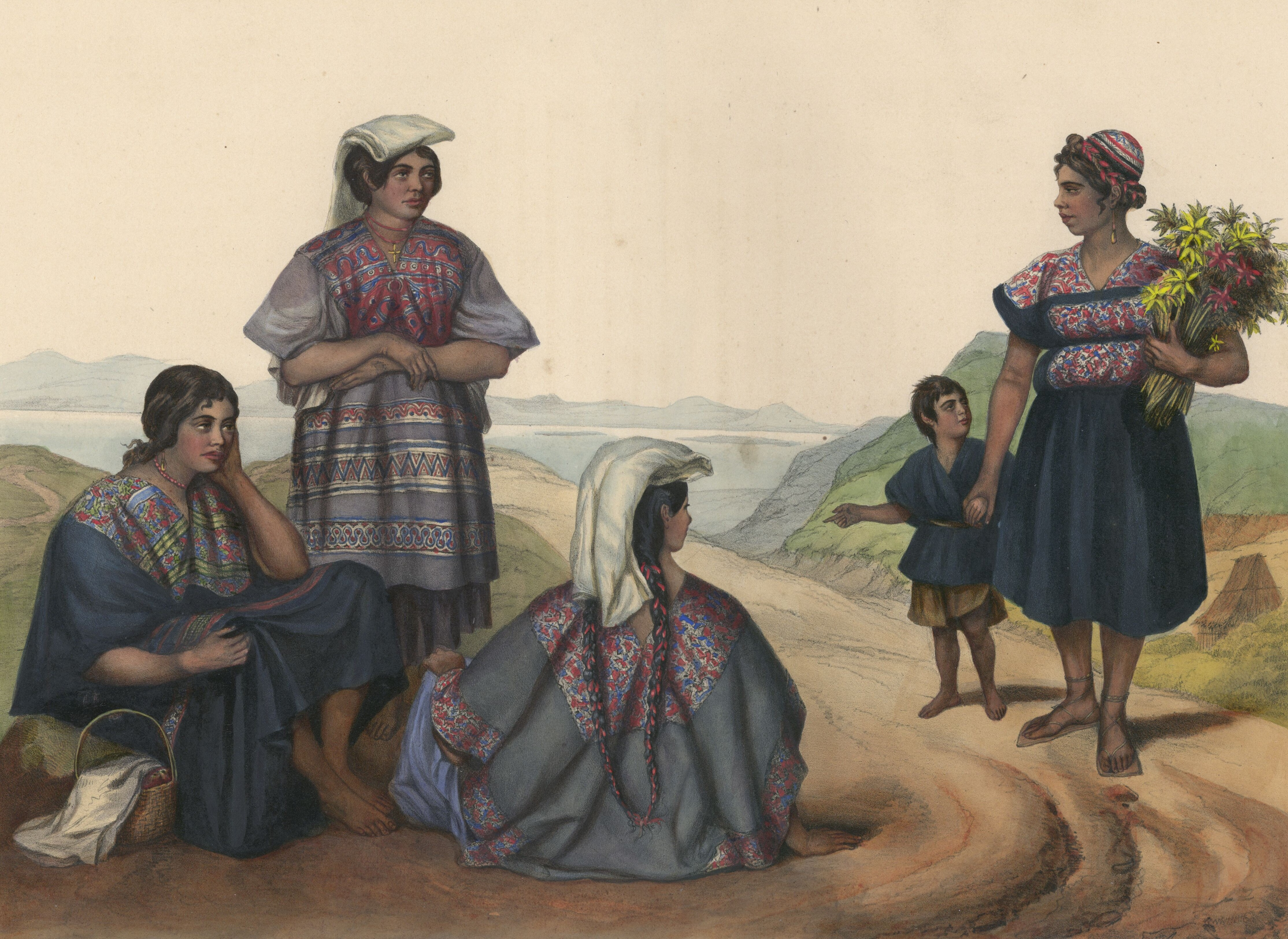
Sierra Indians, published 1836

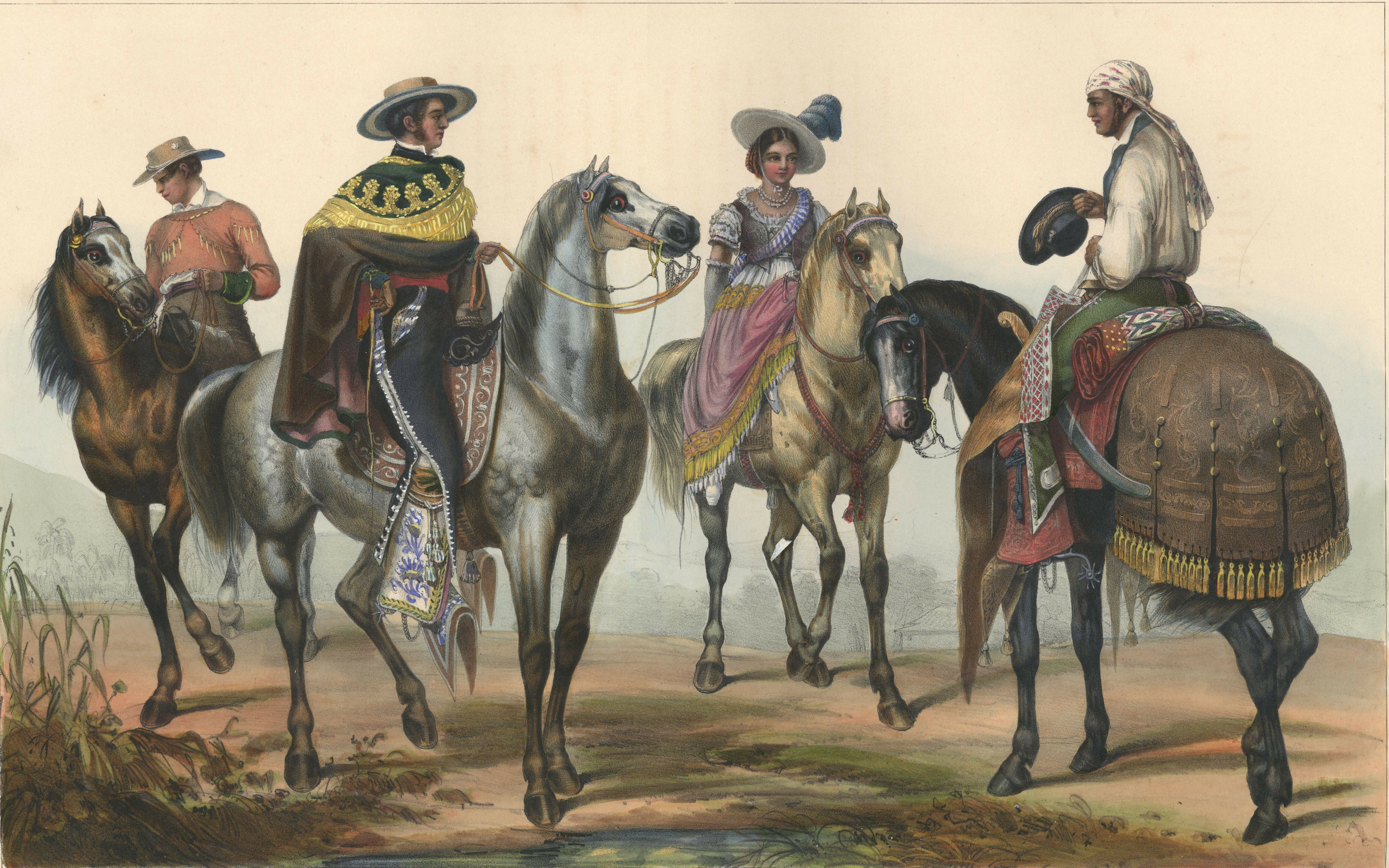
The hacienda owner and his mayordomo, published 1836

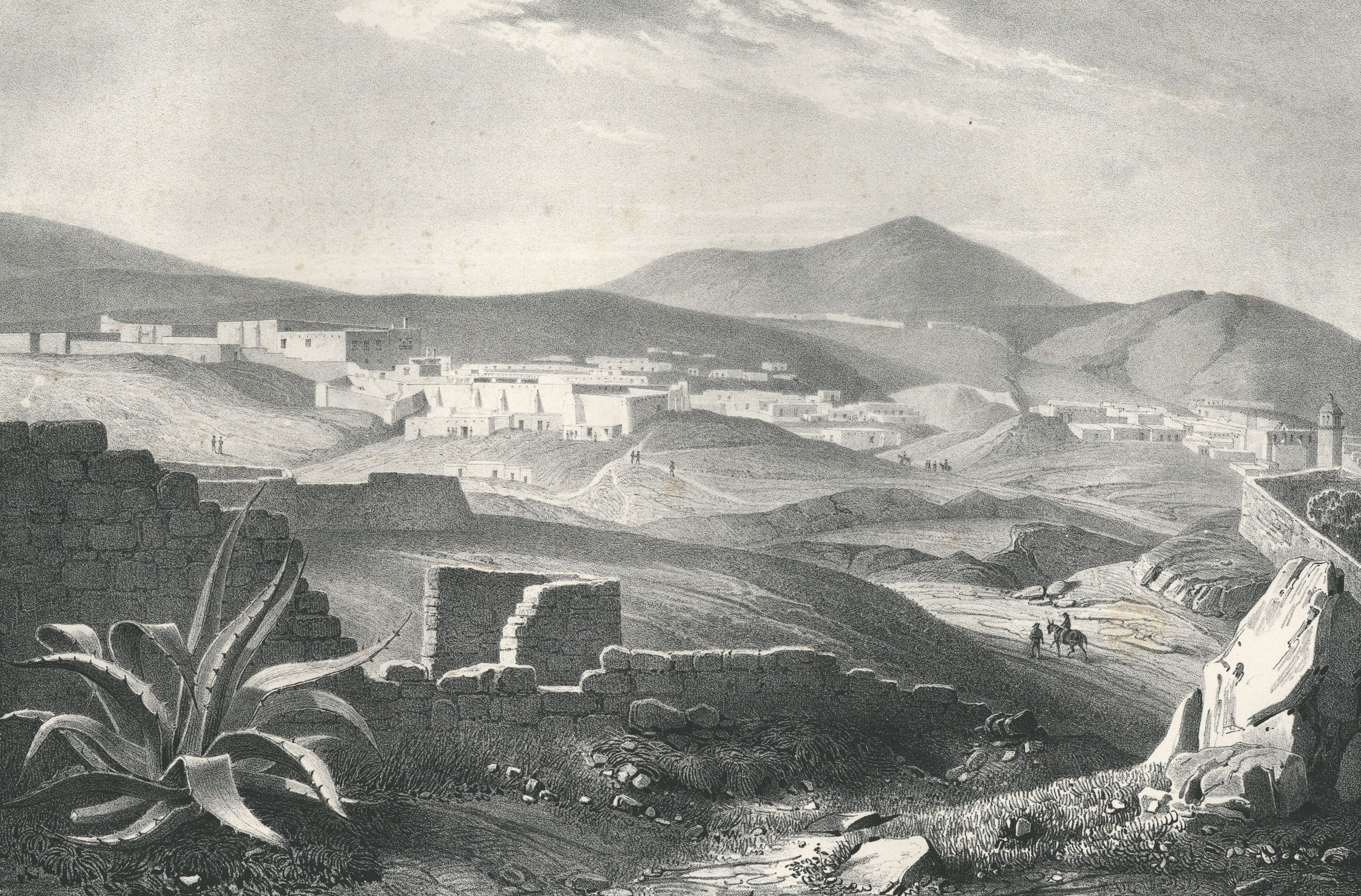
Mina de Veta Grande, published 1836

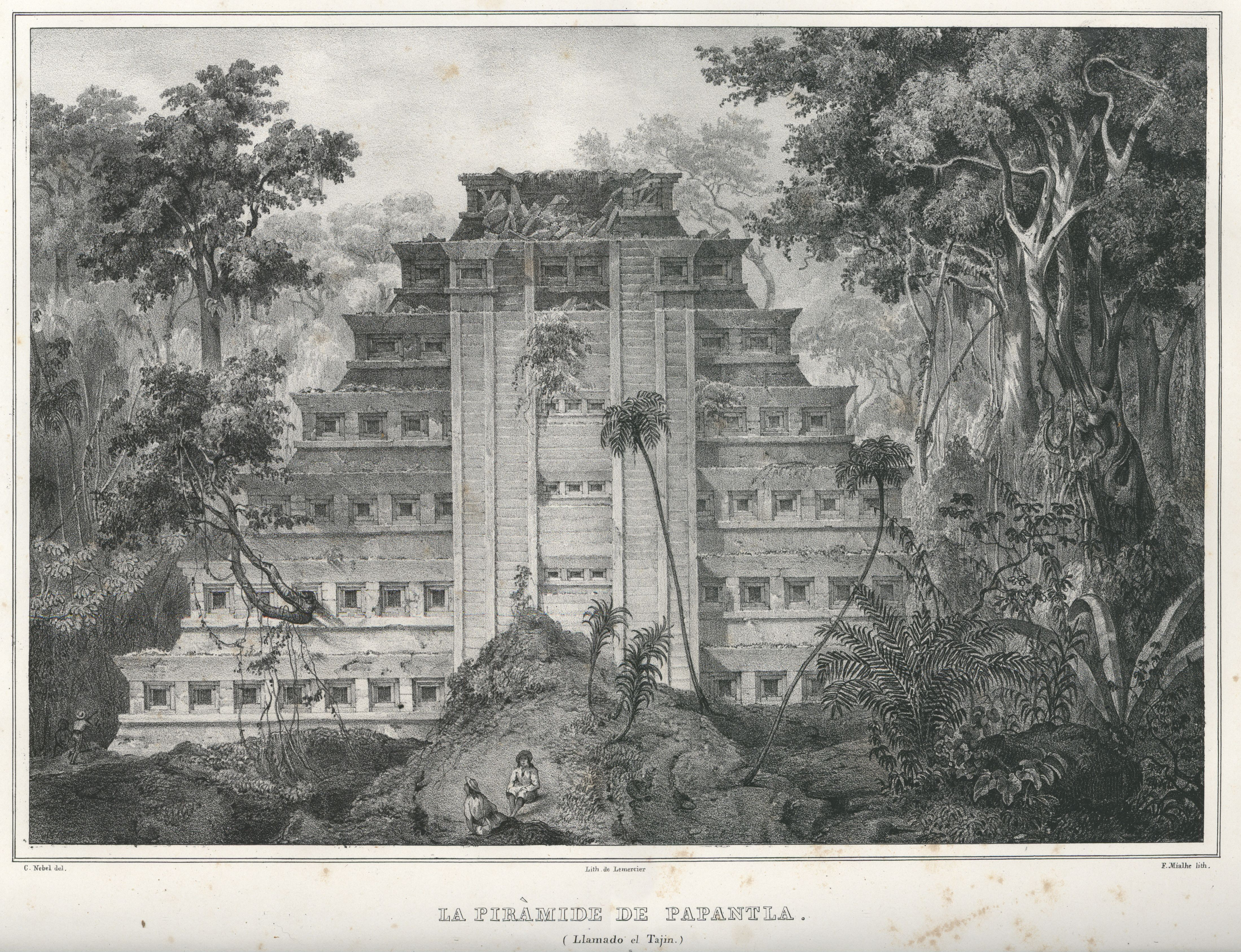
One of Carl Nebel's drawings of the Pyramid of the Niches, published 1836

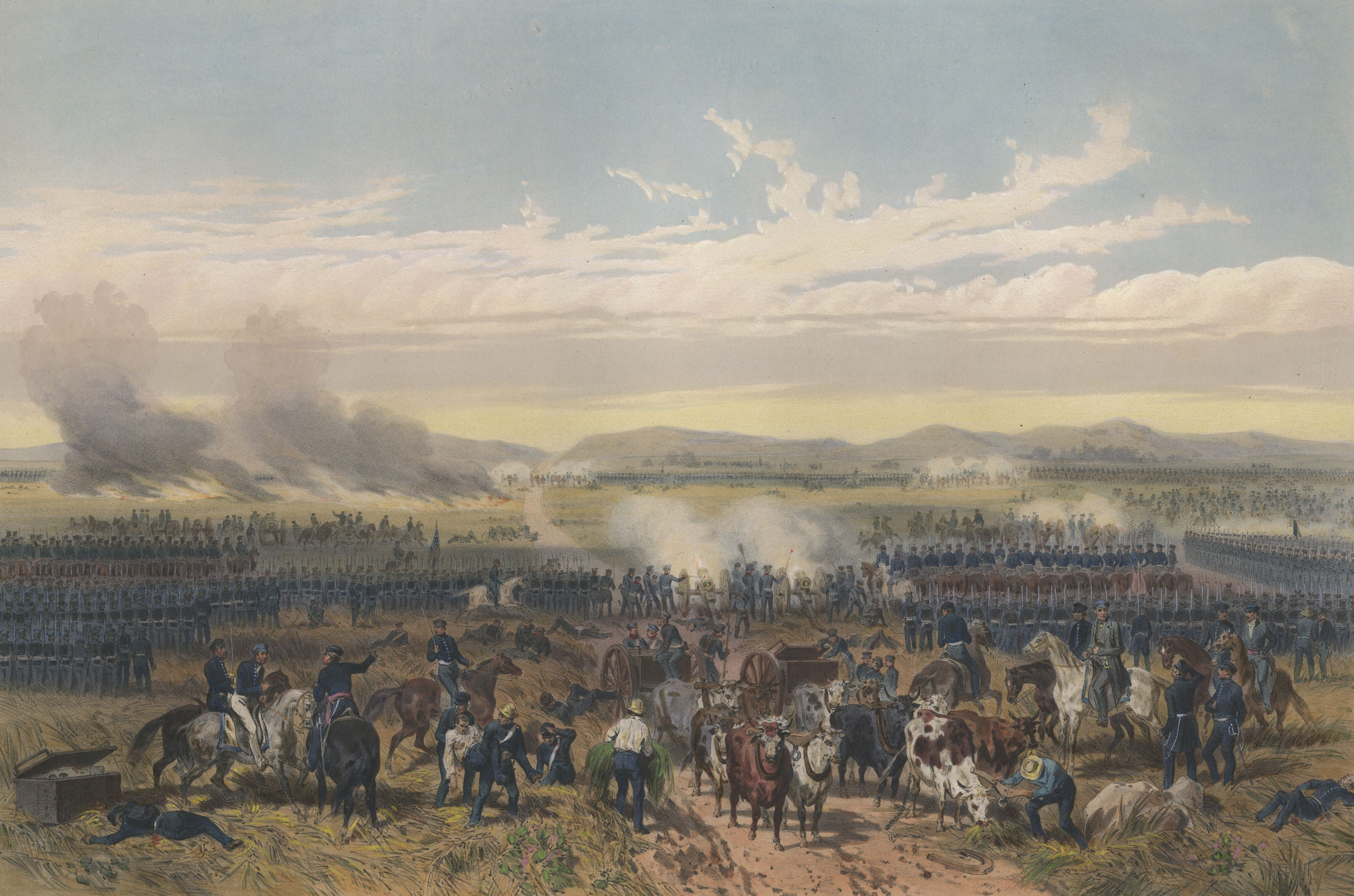
Battle of Palo Alto

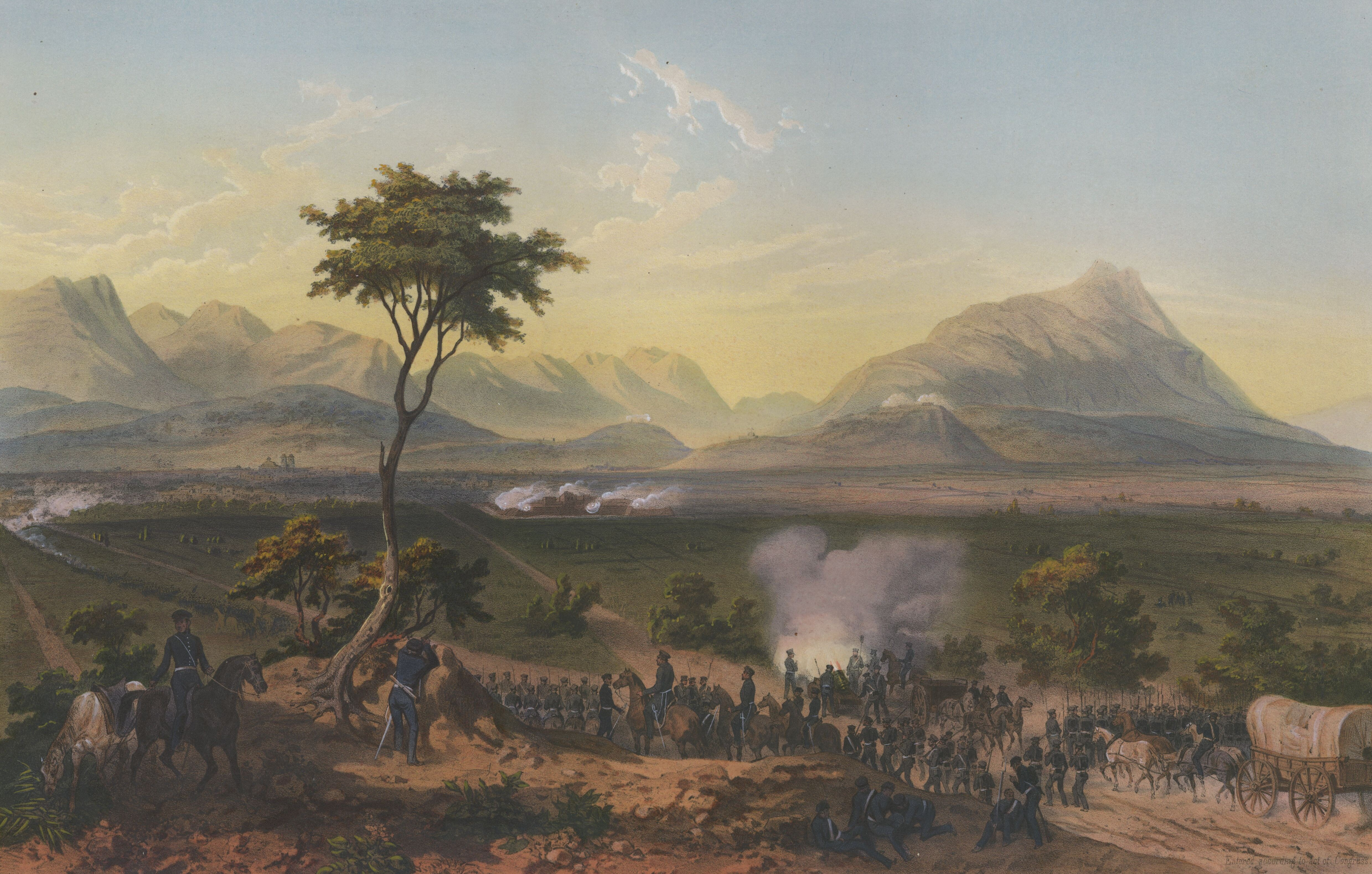
Battle of Monterrey

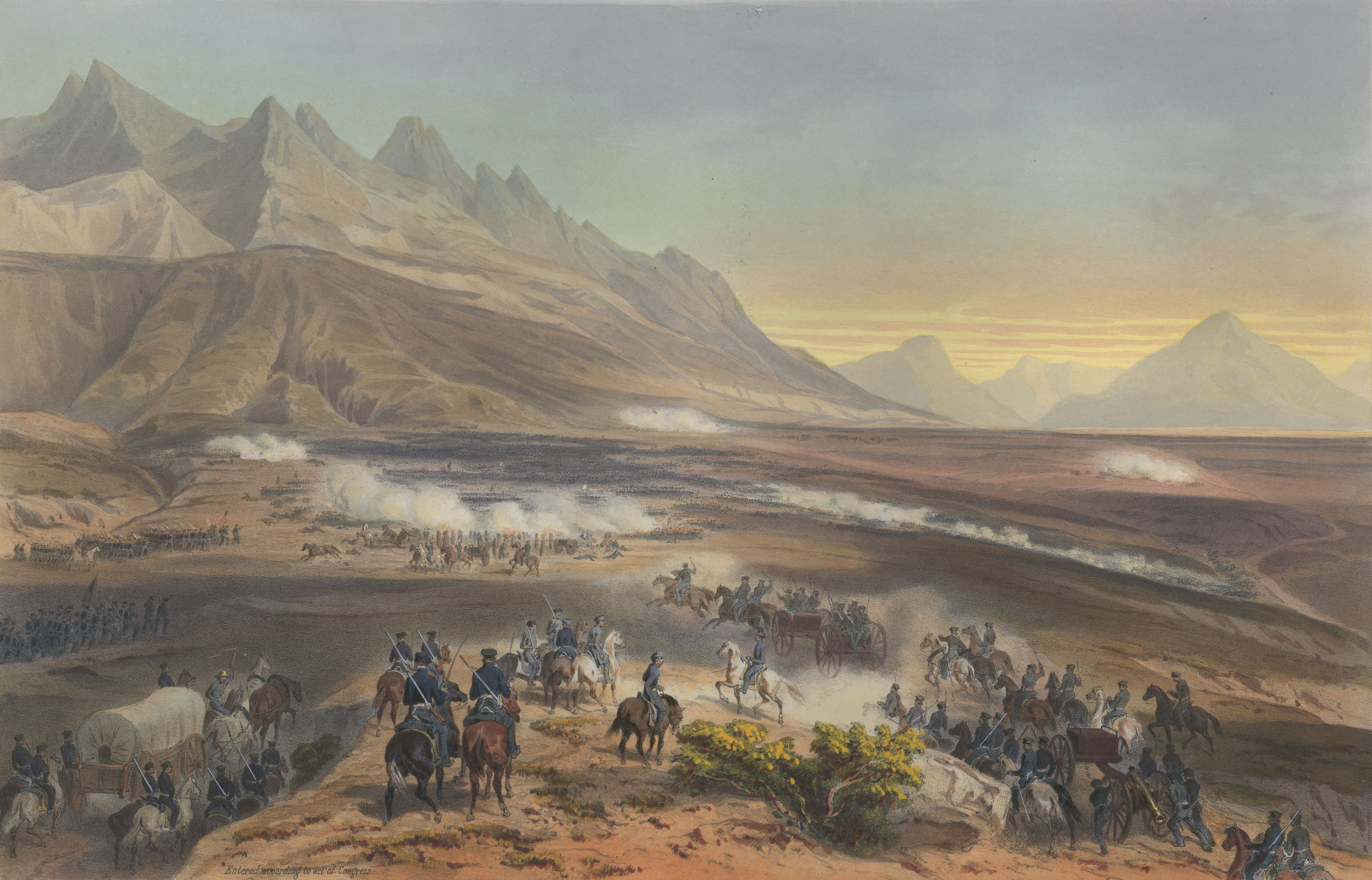
Battle of Buena Vista

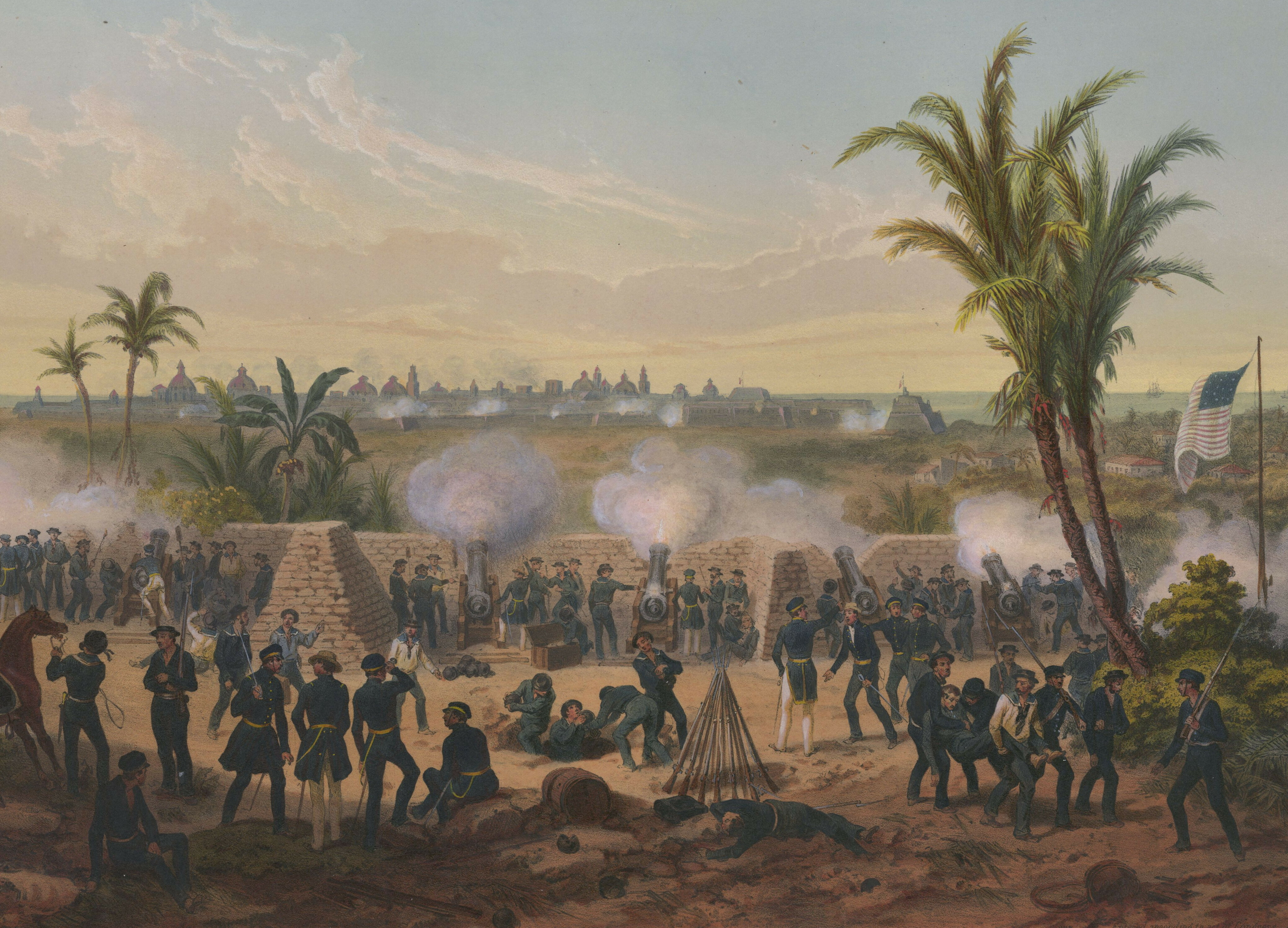
Siege of Veracruz

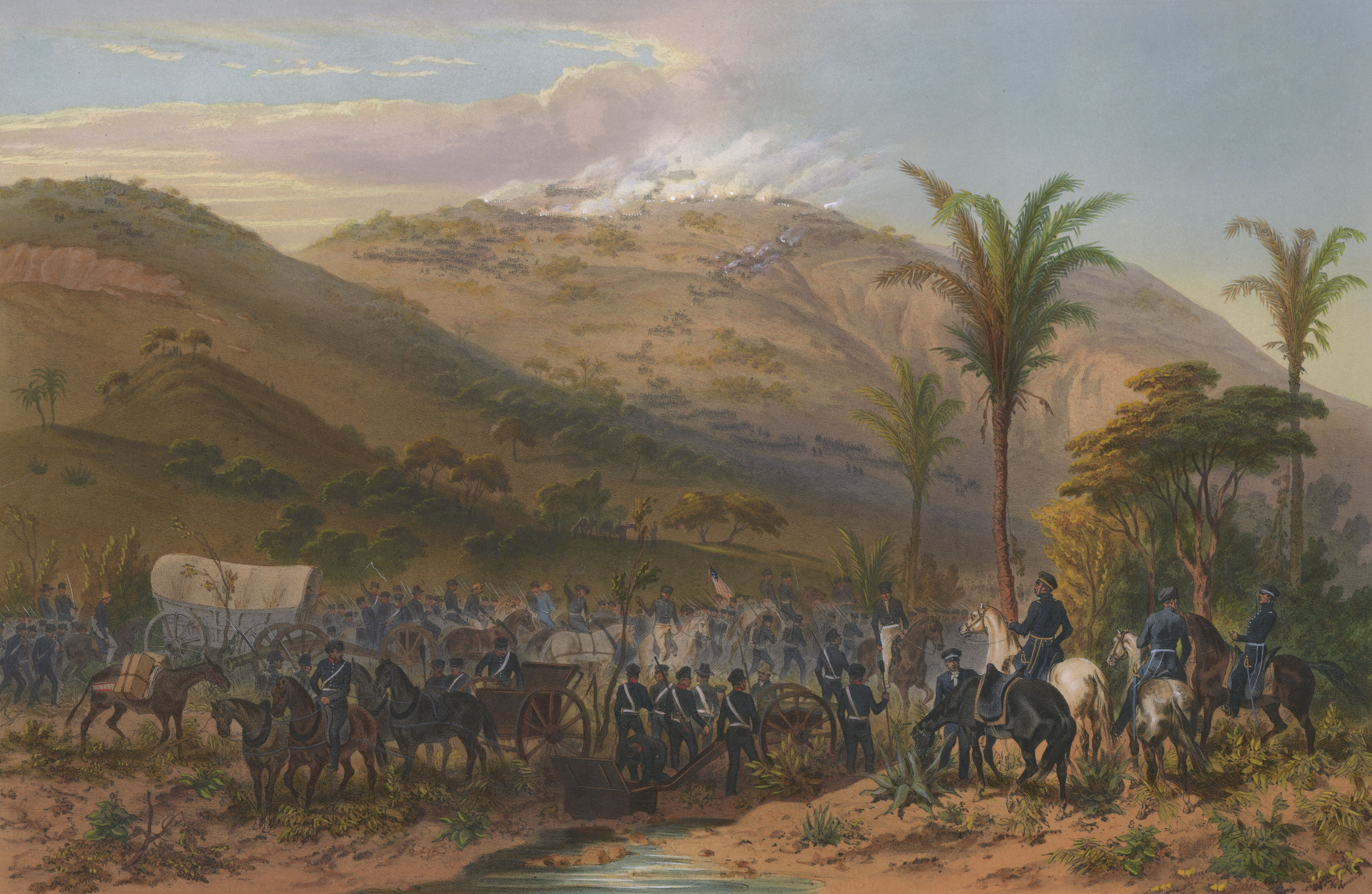
Battle of Cerro Gordo

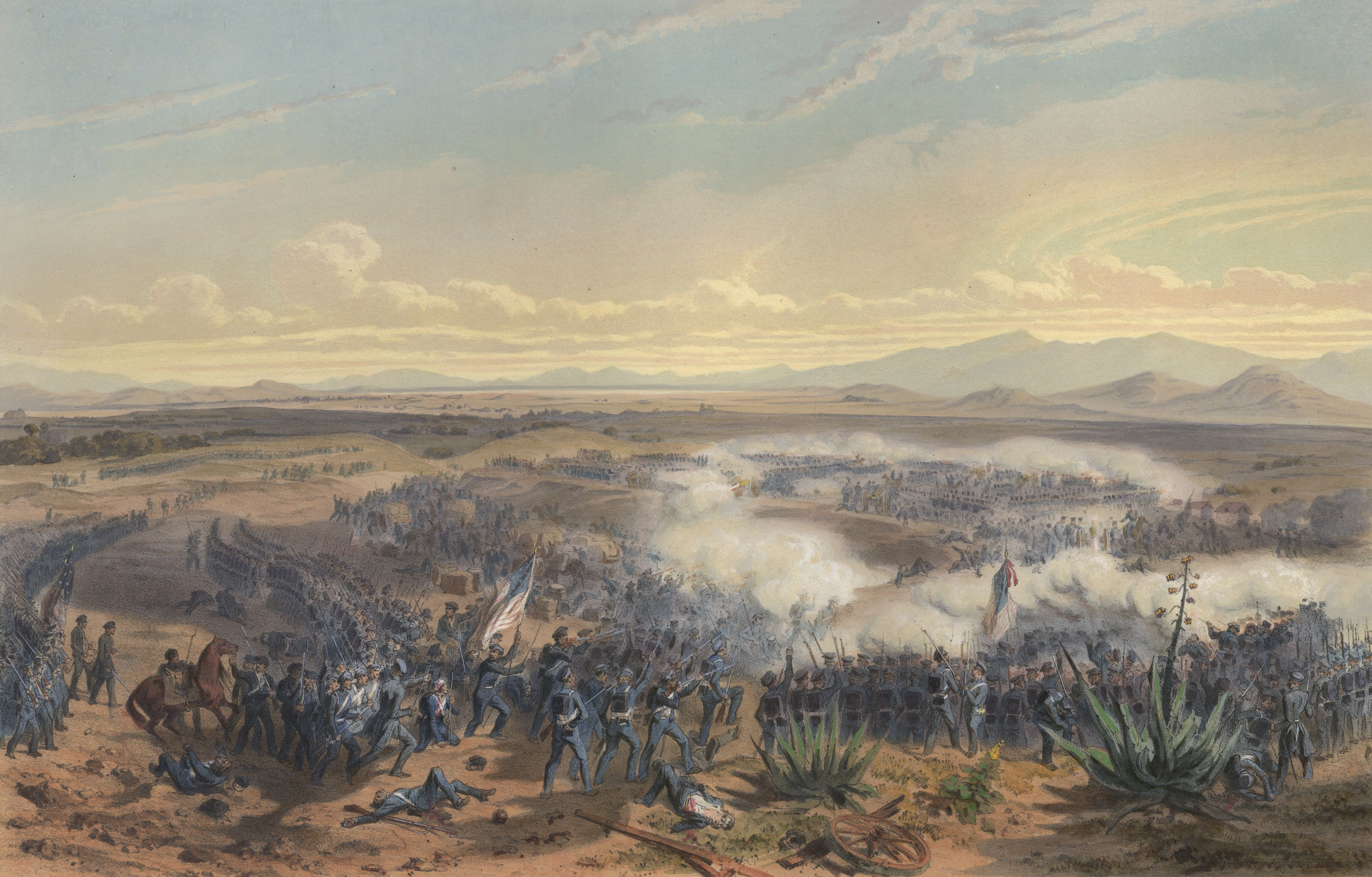
Battle of Contreras

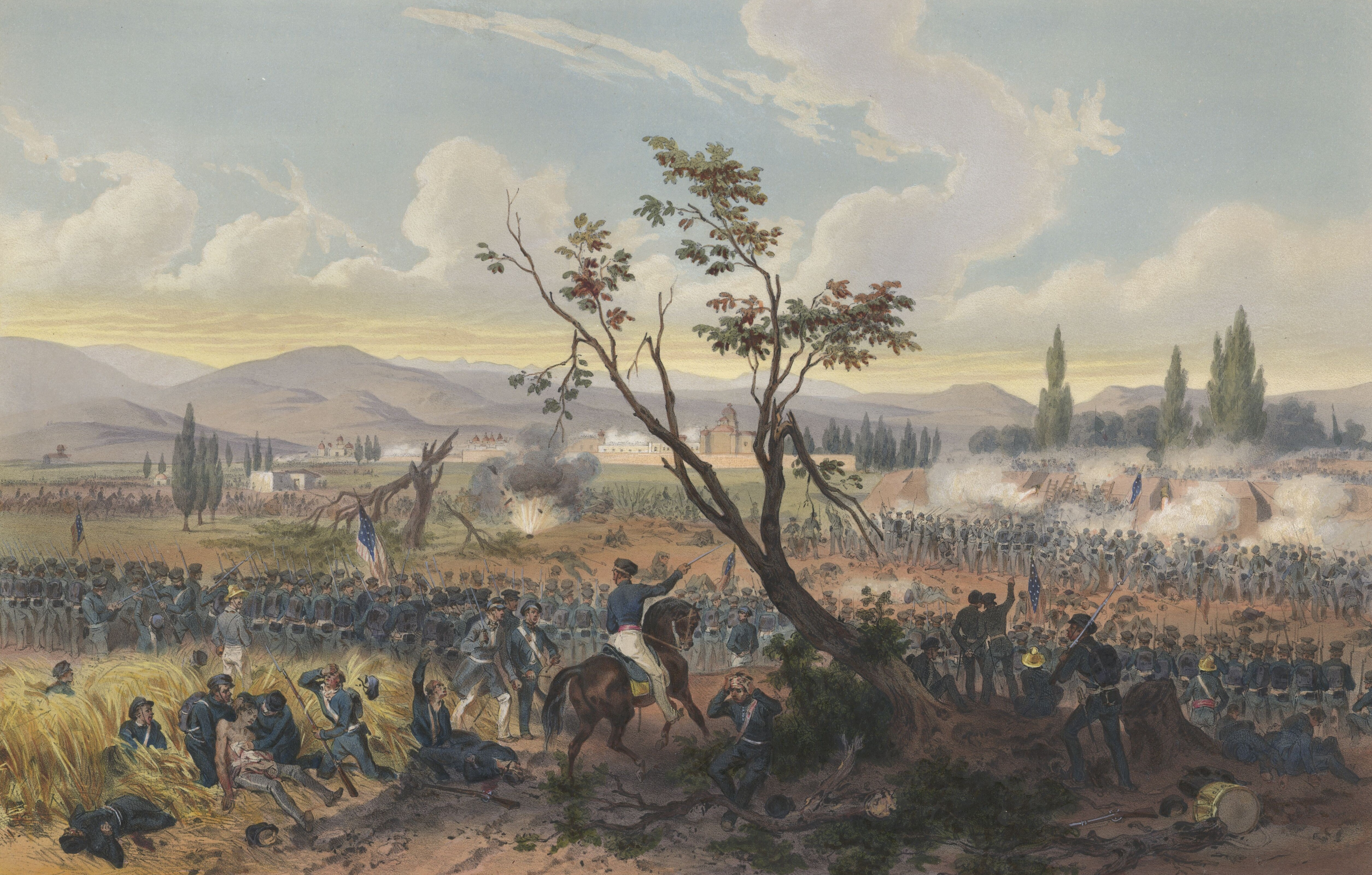
Battle of Churubusco

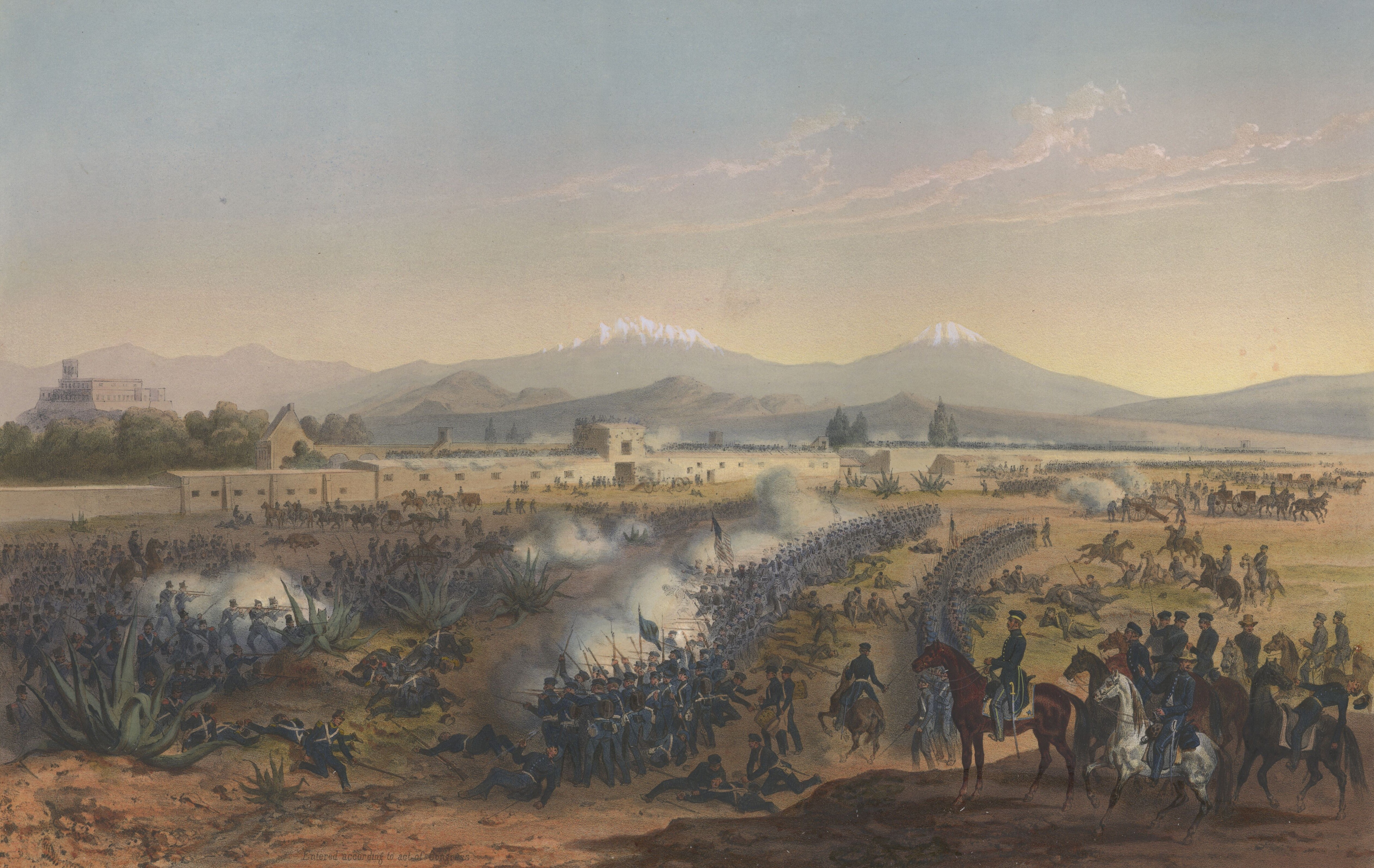
Battle of Molino del Rey

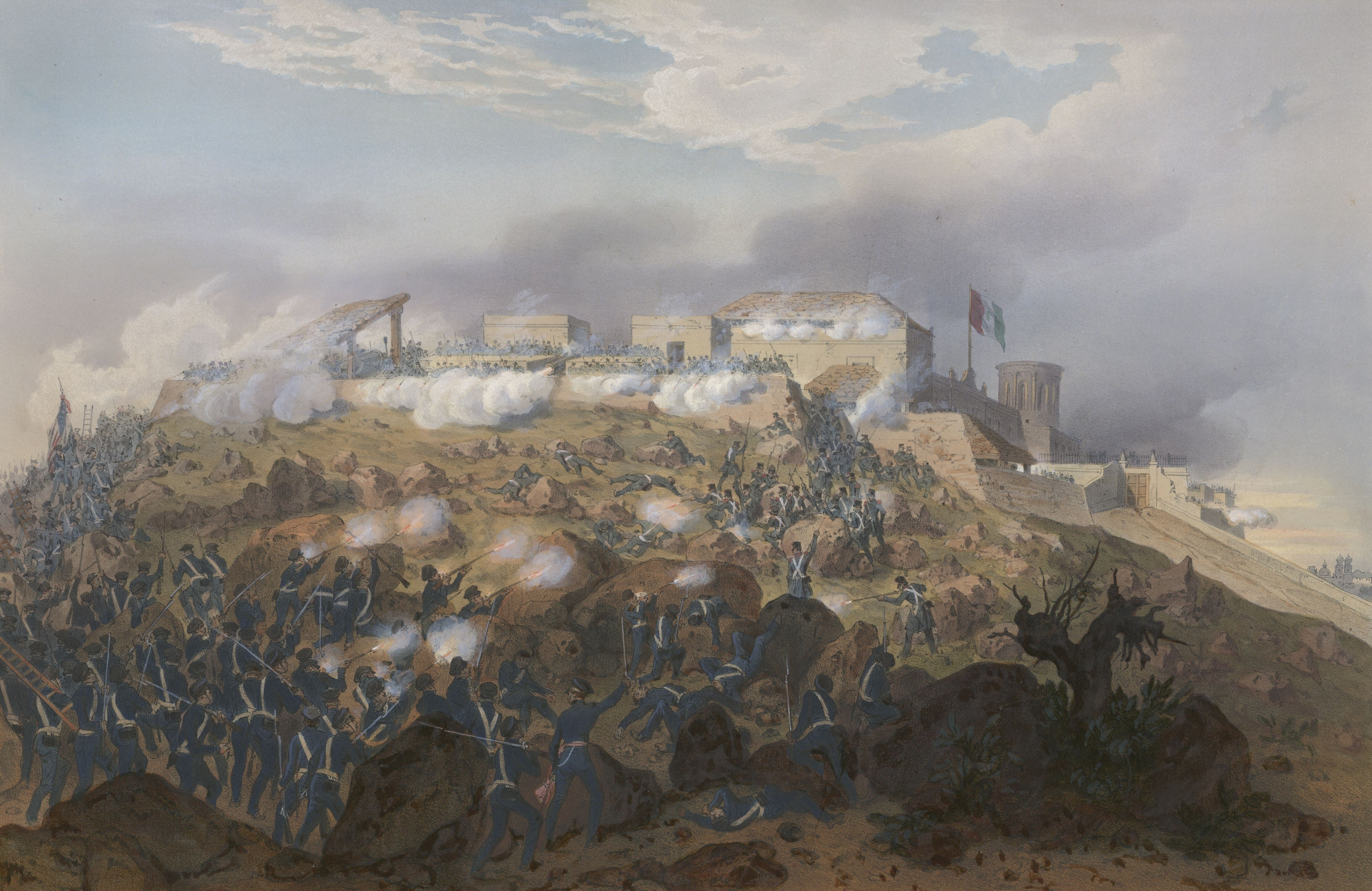
Battle of Chapultepec, Pillow's actions

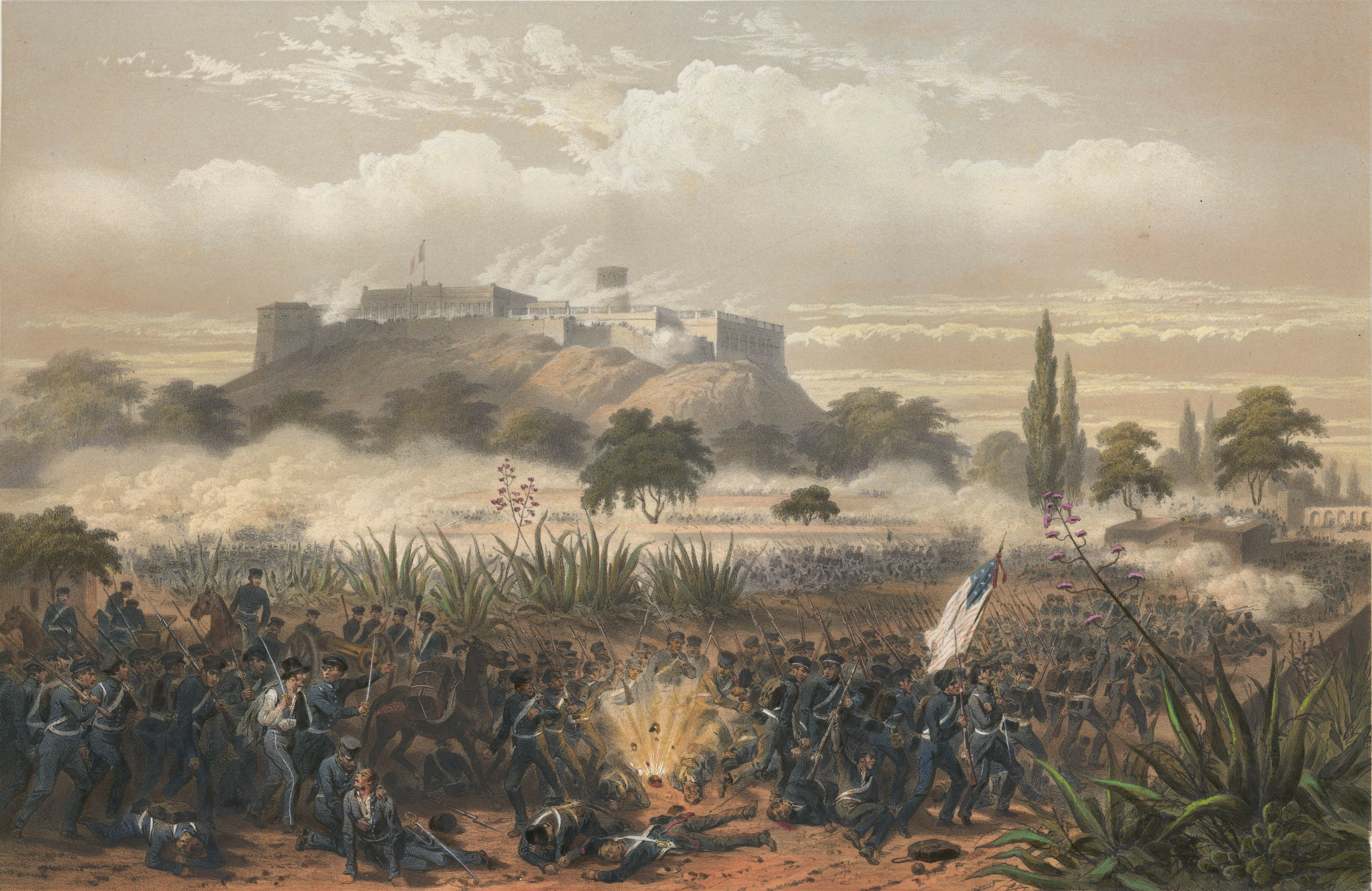
Battle of Chapultepec, Quitman's actions
