= Francisco Pérez (sport shooter) =

Spanish sports shooter (born 1940)

Personal information
- Nationality: Spanish
- Born: 4 November 1940 (age 85)

Sport
- Sport: Sports shooting

Francisco Pérez (born 4 November 1940) is a Spanish sports shooter. He competed at the 1980 Summer Olympics and the 1984 Summer Olympics.
