= Buena Vista, Kentucky =

Unincorporated community in Kentucky, United States

Coordinates: 38°26′10″N 84°10′5″W

Buena Vista is an unincorporated community in Harrison County, Kentucky, in the United States.

== History ==
A post office was established at Buena Vista in 1848, and remained in operation until it was discontinued in 1864. Buena Vista was described in 1877 as a small village which contained a store, church and school.
