= Nuclear prelamin A recognition factor =

Protein-coding gene in the species Homo sapiens

NARF

Identifiers
- Aliases: NARF, IOP2, nuclear prelamin A recognition factor
- External IDs: OMIM: 605349; MGI: 1914858; HomoloGene: 57048; GeneCards: NARF; OMA:NARF - orthologs

Gene location (Human)
Chr.	Chromosome 17 (human)
Band	17q25.3	Start	82,458,180 bp
Band	17q25.3	End	82,490,537 bp

Gene location (Mouse)
Chr.	Chromosome 11 (mouse)
Band	11|11 E2	Start	121,128,079 bp
Band	11|11 E2	End	121,146,682 bp
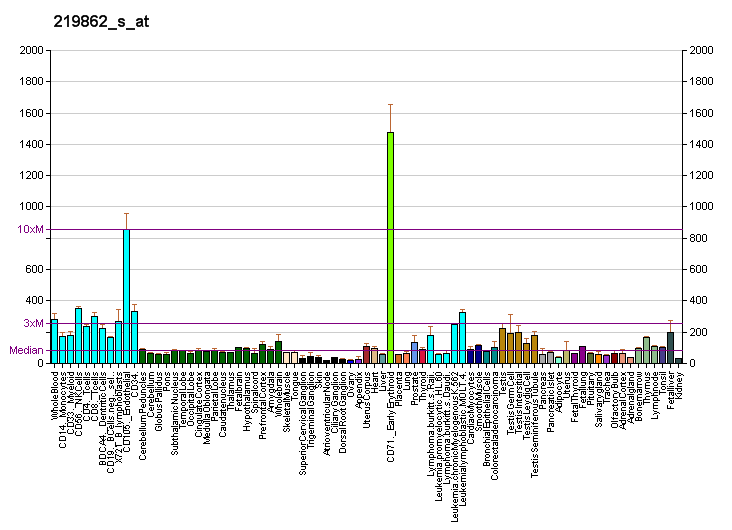
RNA expression pattern
Bgee	Human / Mouse (ortholog); Top expressed in: left testis; right testis; apex of heart; right hemisphere of cerebellum; ganglionic eminence; trabecular bone; spleen; granulocyte; gonad; blood / Top expressed in: fetal liver hematopoietic progenitor cell; triceps brachii muscle; muscle of thigh; skeletal muscle tissue; sternocleidomastoid muscle; medial head of gastrocnemius muscle; temporal muscle; knee joint; interventricular septum; myocardium of ventricle; More reference expression data
BioGPS	More reference expression data
Orthologs
Species	Human	Mouse
Entrez	26502	67608
Ensembl	ENSG00000141562	ENSMUSG00000000056
UniProt	Q9UHQ1	Q9CYQ7
RefSeq (mRNA)	NM_001038618; NM_001083608; NM_012336; NM_031968	NM_026272
RefSeq (protein)	NP_001033707; NP_001077077; NP_036468; NP_114174	NP_080548
Location (UCSC)	Chr 17: 82.46 – 82.49 Mb	Chr 11: 121.13 – 121.15 Mb
PubMed search
- Wikidata
View/Edit Human	View/Edit Mouse

Nuclear prelamin A recognition factor, also known as NARF, is a protein which in humans is encoded by the NARF gene.

== Function ==
Several proteins have been found to be prenylated and methylated at their carboxyl-terminal ends. Prenylation was initially believed to be important only for membrane attachment. However, another role for prenylation appears to be its importance in protein–protein interactions. The only nuclear proteins known to be prenylated in mammalian cells are prelamin A- and B-type lamins. Prelamin A is farnesylated and carboxymethylated on the cysteine residue of a carboxyl-terminal CaaX motif. This post-translationally modified cysteine residue is removed from prelamin A when it is endoproteolytically processed into mature lamin A. The protein encoded by this gene binds to the prenylated prelamin A carboxyl-terminal tail domain. It may be a component of a prelamin A endoprotease complex. The encoded protein is located in the nucleus, where it partially colocalizes with the nuclear lamina. It shares limited sequence similarity with iron-only bacterial hydrogenases. Alternatively spliced transcript variants encoding different isoforms have been identified for this gene, including one with a novel exon that is generated by RNA editing.

== Interactions ==
NARF has been shown to interact with LMNA.
