= Narf (singer) =

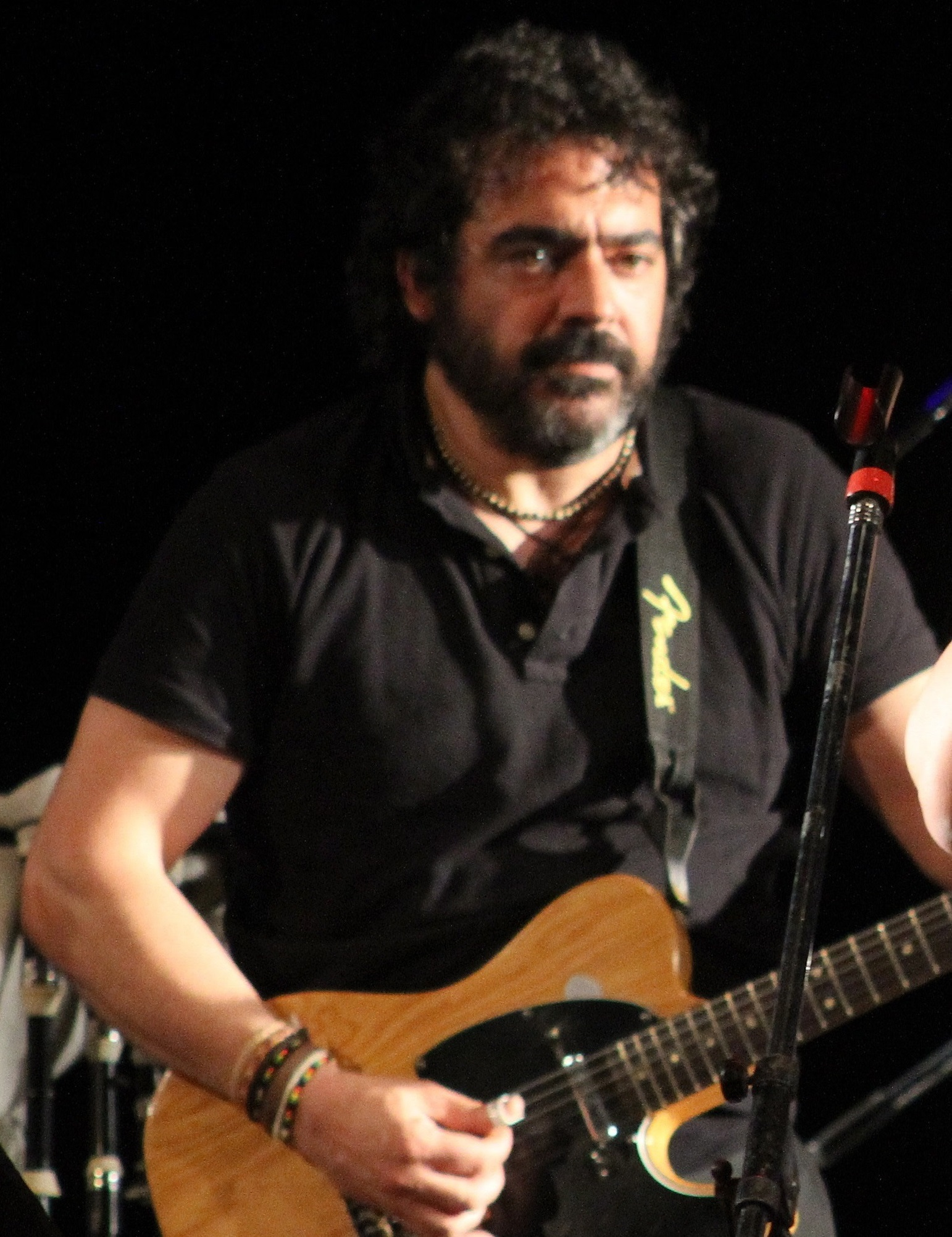
- Narf in the MICSUR, Mar del Plata, Argentina, on 17 May 2014

Background information
- Born: Francisco Xavier Pérez Vázquez; 24 April 1968
- Origin: Silleda, Spain
- Died: 15 November 2016 (aged 48) Santiago de Compostela, Spain
- Occupations: Singer, songwriter, actor
- Instruments: Guitar, voice
- Website: franpereznarf.com

Francisco Xavier Pérez Vázquez (24 April 1968 – 15 November 2016), best known as Narf, and, firstly, as a member of the bands Os Quinindiolas and Nicho Varullo, in the theatrical company Chévere and posteriorly in Psicofónica de Conxo, unically as Fran Pérez, was a Galician singer and songwriter, who sought to incorporate diverse musical genres to rock structure.

== Career ==
Narf was first featured as a soundtrack composer, combining this aspect with the acting one in different theatre roles. He also collaborated with many other artists, taking his music around the world, championing his compromise with Galician culture, nonetheless feeling profound affinity with African music.
