= Paco Pérez Durán =

Spanish footballer (1961–2025)

Personal information
- Full name: Francisco Pérez Durán
- Date of birth: 16 September 1961
- Place of birth: Priego de Córdoba, Spain
- Date of death: 29 June 2025 (aged 63)
- Height: 1.90 m (6 ft 3 in)
- Position: Defender

Senior career*
Years	Team	Apps	(Gls)
1980–1984	Castilla	60	(1)
1981–1982	→ Deportivo de La Coruña (loan)	23	(1)
1984–1985	Granada	31	(0)
1985–1986	Parla	33	(0)
1986–1987	Alcoyano	38	(3)
1987–1988	Cartagena	24	(1)
1988–1990	Linares	41	(2)
1990–1992	Racing de Santander	15	(0)
Total		265	(8)
- * Club domestic league appearances and goals

Francisco "Paco" Pérez Durán (16 September 1961 – 29 June 2025) was a Spanish professional footballer who played as a defender.

== Career ==
Born in Priego de Córdoba, Pérez Durán played for Castilla, Deportivo de La Coruña, Granada, Parla, Alcoyano, Cartagena, Linares and Racing de Santander. With Castilla he won the 1983–84 Segunda División.

== Personal life and death ==
Pérez Durán suffered from ALS.

On 1 June 2025, Real Madrid had a veterans' benefit match for Pérez Durán. He died on 29 June 2025, aged 63.

His brother José Manuel Pérez Durán was also a footballer.
