= Adolphe Jean-Baptiste Bayot =

French lithographer (1810–1871)

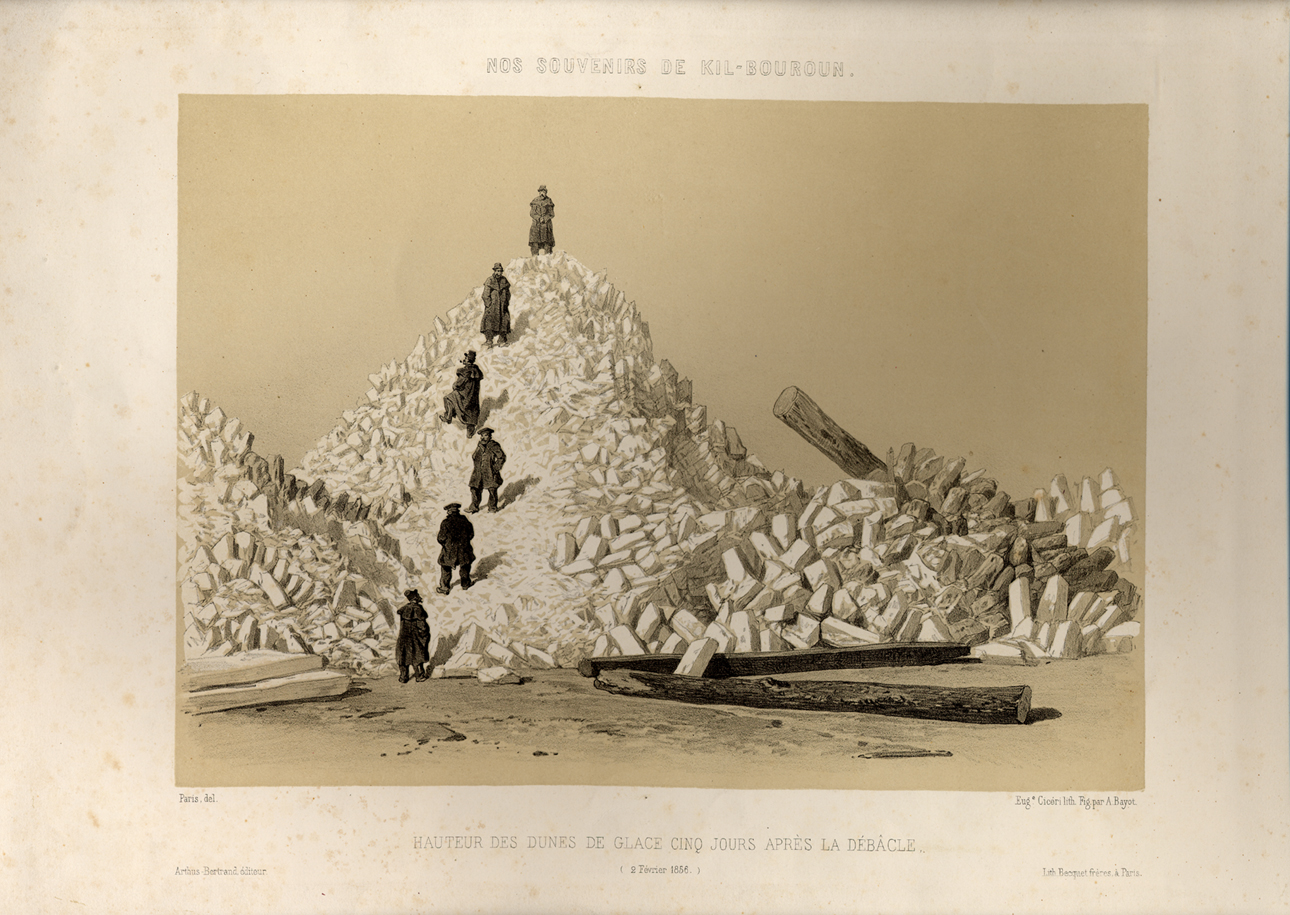
Russian fort at Kil-Bouroun after the Battle of Kinburn of the Crimean War

Adolphe Jean-Baptiste Bayot (1810–1871), was a French lithographer.

== See also ==
- List of French artists
