= H. Clay Davis =

American politician (1814–1866)

Henry Clay Davis

Member of the Texas Senate from the 21st district
- In office November 15, 1849 – November 3, 1851
- Preceded by: district created
- Succeeded by: Edward Burleson

Personal details
- Born: September 29, 1814 Georgia
- Died: December 8, 1866 (aged 52)

Henry Clay Davis (September 29, 1814 – December 8, 1866) was an American soldier, businessman, politician, and Texas Ranger, known for founding the city of Rio Grande City, Texas.

== Early life ==
Davis was born in Georgia on September 29, 1814. His family moved to Kentucky in 1816.

== Texas Militia ==
At the age of 20, Davis left his home in Kentucky to travel throughout the United States. He arrived in San Antonio, Texas in 1836, enlisting in the First Cavalry Regiment of the Texas Militia on November 9. As part of his service, he took part in the Council House Fight, the Battle of the Salado, and the Mier expedition. In December 1842, during the Mier expedition, Davis was captured by Mexican troops and imprisoned. He, alongside the other prisoners, was later released on September 16, 1844.

== Founding of Rio Grande City ==
After being released from prison, Davis traveled to Corpus Christi, where he became known as a prominent merchant. During the 1840s, he traveled to Camargo, Mexico, where he met his wife, Maria Hilaria de la Garza. The two married in 1846. (Note: Sources differ on the exact date of their marriage. The Handbook of Texas lists a date of April 21. Norman Rozeff, writing for the Valley Morning Star, gives their marriage date as March 24.)

Garza was the heir to a large estate granted to her family during Spanish colonization of Mexico. After marriage, the couple moved to Garza's estate, where Davis would found Rio Grande City in 1847. He built Davis Landing, a docking port for boats traveling along the Rio Grande, and based his design for the port on Austin, the capital of Texas.

During the Mexican-American War, while Davis was serving under then-General Zachary Taylor, he leased 33 acres to the United States government, who established Fort Ringgold (initially called Camp Ringgold) on the land. Following the establishment of Starr County in 1848, Davis was chosen to be the county's first clerk. Davis continued his business activities in the area, working alongside other business partners to open a wagon route in August 1849. The route ran between Corpus Christi, Laredo, Rio Grande City, and Mier, Mexico.

== Later life ==
In 1848, Davis became a member of the Texas Ranger Division. In December 1859, he participated in the First Cortina War against Juan Cortina as part of the detachment of Texas Rangers led by John Salmon Ford.

Davis served in the Texas Senate for one term between 1849 and 1851, representing the state's 21st Senate district.

On July 12, 1860, Governor of Texas Sam Houston appointed Davis to the position of brigadier general in the Texas Militia, and stationed him near the state's border. When the American Civil War began in 1861, Davis initially favored the Union, but ultimately supported Texas joining the Confederacy, and fought for them during the war.

== Death ==
On the morning of December 8, 1866, Davis set out on a hunting expedition. During the trip, the wagon carrying Davis overturned. Davis's shotgun, which he was holding in his hands at the time, accidentally fired, fatally shooting him in the right thigh and abdomen. Hermann Breusing, writing about Davis's death in the Brownsville Daily Ranchero, said that "he knew, at once, that he was going to die, and looked death boldly in the face, he did not fear it, as he expressed himself".
