= Blas María de la Garza Falcón =

Spanish settler (1712–1767)

Blas Villarreal
- Born: 1712; Spanish Empire
- Died: 1767 (aged 54–55); Camargo, Spanish Empire
- Children: 2 sons and 1 daughter
- Parent: Beatriz de Villarreal

Captain Blas María de la Garza Falcón de Villarreal (1712 – 1767) was a Spanish settler of Nuevo Santander.

== Biography ==
Capt. Blas María de la Garza Falcón de Villarreal, colonizer of South Texas and Tamaulipas and the first settler of Nueces County, Texas, was born in Real de las Salinas, Nuevo León, Mexico, in 1712 to Gen. Blas Maria de la Garza Falcón, twice governor of Coahuila, and Beatriz de Villarreal. His five brothers and six sisters spent their childhood at the hacienda Pesquería Chica near Monterrey. He probably received his education in Monterrey. By 1734, he was a captain at Presidio de San Gregorio de Cerralvo in Nuevo León. On January 4, 1731, de la Garza Falcón married Catarina Gómez de Castro, daughter of Capt. Antonio Gómez de Castro and Nicolasa Baes de Treviño, at the mining town of Boca de Leones, present-day Villaldama, Nuevo León. One daughter, María Gertrudis de la Garza Falcón, and two sons, Juan José and José Antonio de la Garza Falcón, were born to this marriage. After the death of Catarina, de la Garza Falcón married Josefa de los Santos Coy, daughter of Nicolás de los Santos Coy, mayor of Cerralvo, and Ana María Guerra. No children were born to this marriage.

In 1747, José de Escandón, colonizer of the area which was then known as Nuevo Santander, chose de la Garza Falcón to explore the south bank of the Rio Grande. de la Garza Falcón led a contingent of fifty men from the presidio of Cerralvo to the mouth of the river. Escandón's plan, as implemented by de la Garza Falcón, was to establish seven settlements along the river— Revilla, Camargo, Mier, Dolores, Reynosa, Laredo, and Vedoya. On March 5, 1749, de la Garza Falcón arranged for forty families from Nuevo León to settle at Camargo on the banks of the Rio Grande. He founded the villa of Camargo, a presidio for the military squadron, and a mission, San Augustín de Laredo, for the Indians. Escandón named him captain and chief justice of Camargo, the first settlement founded on the Rio Grande. In 1752, de la Garza Falcón established a ranch, Carnestolendas, now the site of Rio Grande City, Texas, on the north side of the river.

After two unsuccessful attempts to settle and colonize land near the Nueces River, Escandón gave the assignment to de la Garza Falcón. By 1766, de la Garza Falcón had established a ranching outpost named Santa Petronila five leagues from the Nueces River in what is now Nueces County, Texas. He took his family and employees there and started a ranching enterprise that served as a camp for the Spanish soldiers from Presidio Nuestra Señora de Loreto who explored the vicinity while patrolling in 1767. The ranch, eight miles east of the Nueces River, served as an outpost and way station.

Santa Patronila was the first private land grant issued by Gov. Escandon. Capitan de las Garza Falcón brought his family, servants, friends, longhorn cattle, horses, other domesticated animals and farming tools to his Santa Petronila Ranch settlement. As the first ranchero, he introduced cattle drives, corrals and branding, thus establishing the famous south Texas ranching industry. It is believed he named Santa Gertrudis Creek after his only daughter Dona Gertrudis.

In 1767, de la Garza Falcón returned to Camargo, where he died and was buried in his private chapel, Nuestra Señora de Guadalupe. After his death, the land grants were distributed to the settlers; his family received land extending from the Rio Grande to the Nueces River in South Texas.
