= 2016 Texas Senate election =

- November 8, 2016

16 of the 31 seats in the Texas Senate 16 seats needed for a majority
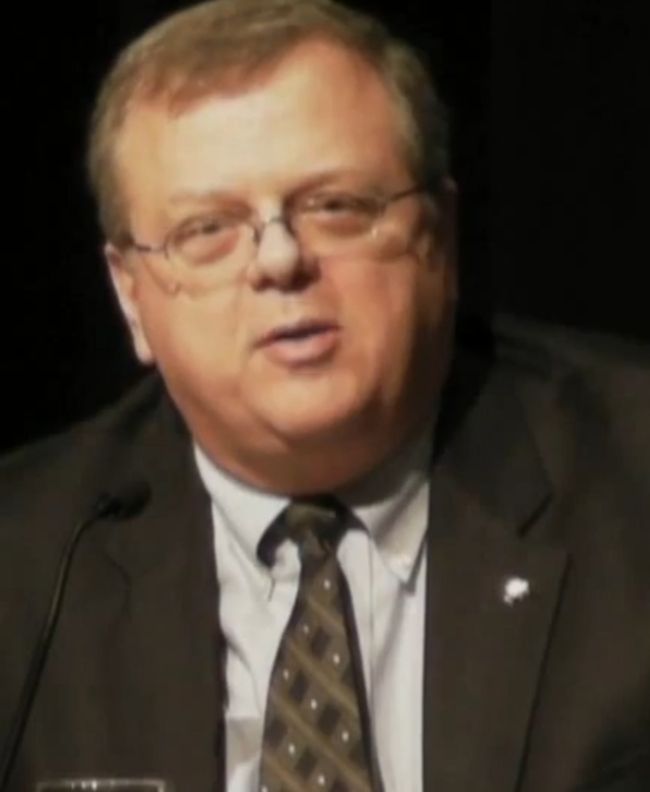

	Majority party	Minority party
Leader	Paul Bettencourt	José R. Rodríguez
Party	Republican	Democratic
Leader since	January 26, 2016	October 12, 2015
Leader's seat	7th–Houston	29th–El Paso
Last election	20 seats, 63.09%	11 seats, 29.71%
Seats before	20	11
Seats won	8	8
Seats after	20	11
Seat change	Steady	Steady
Popular vote	1,985,241	1,355,412
Percentage	56.31%	38.45%
Swing	▼6.78%	▲8.74%
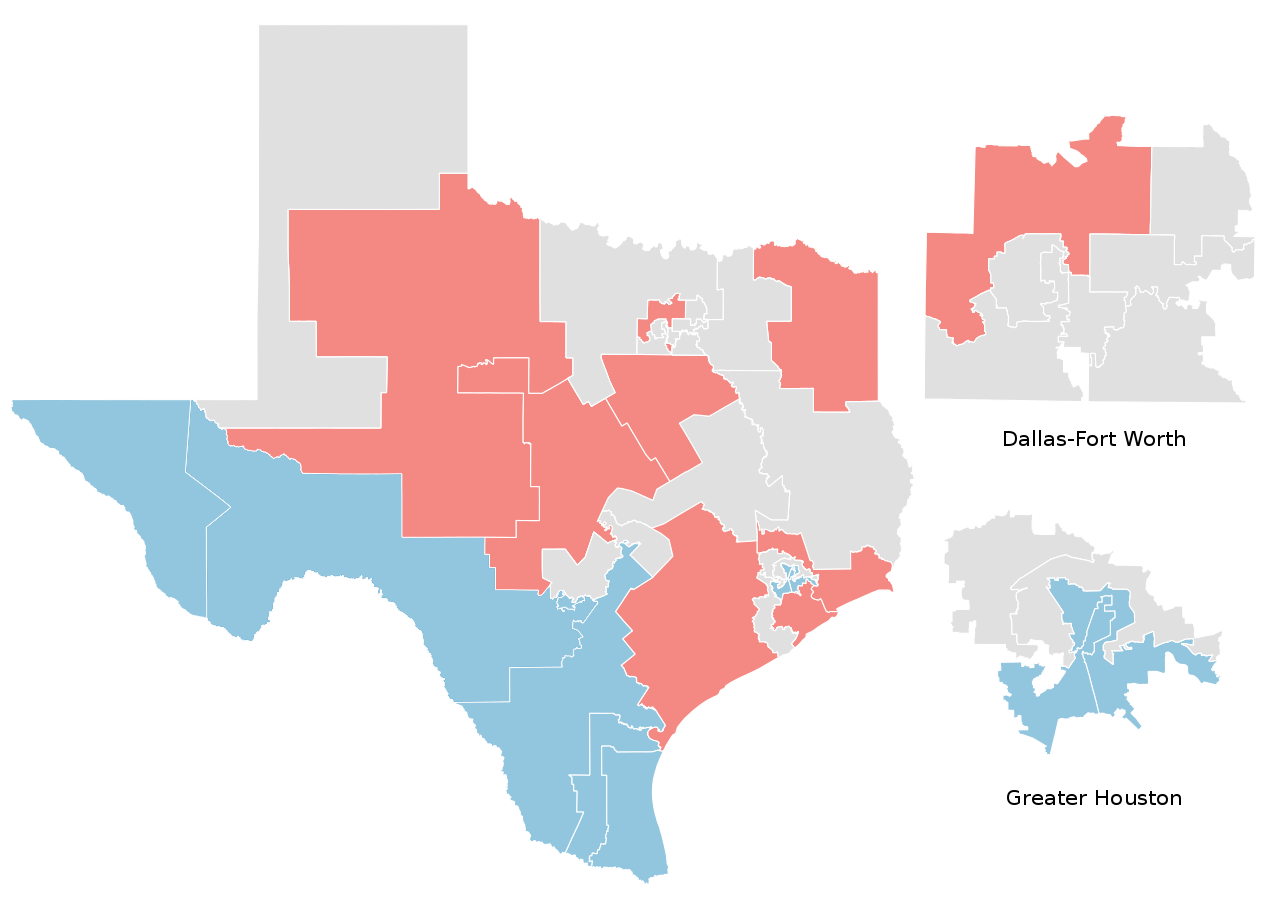
- Election results Republican hold Democratic hold No election

The 2016 Texas Senate elections took place as part of the biennial United States elections. Texas voters elected state senators in 16 of the 31 state senate districts. The winners of this election served in the 85th Texas Legislature. State senators serve four-year terms in the Texas State Senate. A statewide map of Texas's state Senate districts can be obtained from the Texas Legislative Council here, and individual district maps can be obtained from the U.S. Census here.

Following the 2014 State Senate elections, the Republicans maintained effective control of the Senate with twenty members to the Democrats' eleven.

To claim control of the chamber from Republicans, the Democrats needed to gain five Senate seats. While the statewide popular vote for this class of Senators swung 8.6 percentage points toward the Democrats when compared to the vote they earned in the 2012 elections, (Note: Texas holds elections for all Senate seats in years ending in 2. In 2012, for this particular class of Senators, the Republicans and Democrats won 60.42% and 34.00% of the vote, respectively.) both parties retained the eight seats each was defending.

== Predictions ==
Source	Ranking	As of
Governing	Safe R	October 12, 2016

== Summary of race results ==
Summary of the November 8, 2016 Texas Senate election results
Party	Candidates	Votes		Seats				
Party	Candidates	No.	%	Before	Up	Won	After	+/–
Republican	10	1,985,241	56.31	20	8	8	20	Steady
Democratic	10	1,355,412	38.45	11	8	8	11	Steady
Libertarian	6	172,255	4.89	0	0	0	0	Steady
Green	1	12,535	0.36	0	0	0	0	Steady
Total		3,525,443	100.00	31	16	16	31	Steady

Popular vote
Republican	56.31%
Democratic	38.45%
Other	5.24%

Senate seats won
Republican	50.00%
Democratic	50.00%

District	Democratic		Republican		Others		Total		Result
District	Votes	%	Votes	%	Votes	%	Votes	%	Result
District 1	-	-	245,648	100.00%	-	-	245,648	100.00%	Republican hold
District 4	-	-	239,869	87.33%	34,791	12.67%	274,660	100.00%	Republican hold
District 6	119,891	100.00%	-	-	-	-	119,891	100.00%	Democratic hold
District 11	-	-	218,201	100.00%	-	-	218,201	100.00%	Republican hold
District 12	-	-	241,232	82.98%	49,465	17.02%	290,697	100.00%	Republican hold
District 13	178,277	92.50%	-	-	14,447	7.50%	192,724	100.00%	Democratic hold
District 18	-	-	229,051	85.78%	37,965	14.22%	267,016	100.00%	Republican hold
District 19	134,997	55.87%	97,682	40.43%	8,948	3.70%	241,627	100.00%	Democratic hold
District 20	132,128	61.68%	82,098	38.32%	-	-	214,226	100.00%	Democratic hold
District 21	160,959	100.00%	-	-	-	-	160,959	100.00%	Democratic hold
District 22	88,769	29.57%	211,380	70.43%	-	-	300,149	100.00%	Republican hold
District 24	81,836	27.61%	214,568	72.39%	-	-	296,404	100.00%	Republican hold
District 26	155,441	79.87%	-	-	39,174	20.13%	194,615	100.00%	Democratic hold
District 27	135,945	100.00%	-	-	-	-	135,945	100.00%	Democratic hold
District 28	-	-	205,512	100.00%	-	-	205,512	100.00%	Republican hold
District 29	167,169	100.00%	-	-	-	-	167,169	100.00%	Democratic hold
Total	1,355,412	38.45%	1,985,241	56.31%	184,790	5.24%	3,525,443	100.00%	Source:
