= Edward Burleson =

Texan politician (1798–1851)

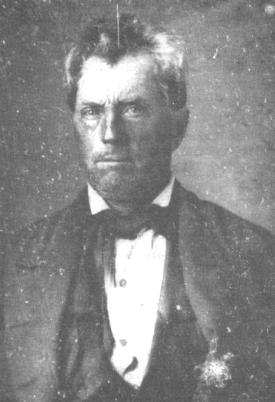
- Edward Burleson in photograph, prior to 1851

3rd Vice President of the Republic of Texas
- In office December 13, 1841 – December 9, 1844
- President: Sam Houston
- Preceded by: David G. Burnet
- Succeeded by: Kenneth Lewis Anderson

Member of the Texas Senate
- In office February 16, 1846 – November 5, 1849
- Preceded by: Constituency established
- Succeeded by: Wilds K. Cooke
- Constituency: 15th district
- In office November 13, 1849 – December 26, 1851
- Preceded by: Robert McAlpin Williamson
- Succeeded by: John Salmon Ford
- Constituency: 16th district (1849–1851); 21st district (1851)

Personal details
- Born: December 15, 1798 Buncombe County, North Carolina
- Died: December 26, 1851 (aged 53) Austin, Texas
- Party: Democratic
- Occupation: Businessman, politician

Edward Burleson (December 15, 1798 – December 26, 1851) was the third vice president of the Republic of Texas. After Texas was annexed to the United States, he served in the State Senate. Prior to his government service in Texas, he was a commander of Texian Army forces during the Texas Revolution. Before moving to Texas, he served in militias in Alabama, Missouri, and Tennessee, and fought in the War of 1812. Burleson was the soldier who was given Santa Anna's sword when he surrendered. He died in Austin, Texas in December 1851.

== Early life ==
Edward Burleson was born in North Carolina on December 15, 1798 in Buncombe County, North Carolina. He was the son of James B. Burleson, a company captain in the volunteer American army in the War of 1812 and later a participant in the Texas Revolution, as a Captain under his son's command. Edward learned of life in the field as an aide to his father, who could neither read nor write. James B. Burleson was said to be a friend of Andrew Jackson. Aaron Burleson, his grandfather, had fought as a minuteman in the Revolutionary War. He was a second cousin of Baylor University president Rufus Columbus Burleson. The Burleson family were ancestrally from Wales.

Burleson became known as the "Old Indian Fighter", and was also a veteran of the War of 1812 where he had served in the Missouri and Texas militias. In October 1835 he was appointed a lieutenant colonel in the Texas army and served under Stephen F. Austin in the opening stages of the Texas Revolution. During the Siege of Béxar, Burleson served as the second-in-command to Gen. Austin, and in November 1835 he was elected Major General of Texas Volunteers and took command of the volunteer army besieging San Antonio de Béxar and received the surrender of Mexican general Martín Perfecto de Cos. In March, he was appointed a Colonel of Texas Regulars and led the First Volunteer Infantry Regiment during the Runaway Scrape and at the Battle of San Jacinto.

With the capture of Antonio López de Santa Anna at San Jacinto, the Mexican general rode double into Sam Houston's camp on the horse of Joel Walter Robison, a soldier in most of the revolutionary battles and later a member of the Texas House of Representatives from Fayette County.

Burleson continued to serve in the Republic of Texas army after the war and was eventually promoted brigadier general of Texas Regulars.

His brother Jacob was killed and mutilated in a battle with Comanches in 1839.

== Political service ==
On account of his military credentials, Burleson was elected to the Texas Senate in September 1838, as a local representative for Bastrop, Gonzales, and Fayette Counties.

He served as vice-president of the Republic of Texas in President Sam Houston's second term from 1841 to 1844. He was a presidential candidate in the Texas presidential election of 1844, but he was defeated by Anson Jones.

Burleson served under Sam Houston, and they did not get along very well. Burleson and Houston notably disagreed on many things; These included matters such as Indian policy, in which Burleson did not approve of Houston's attachment to the Cherokee. Houston thought so much of the Cherokee due to his friendship with their leader, Chief Bowl. This came to a head when Chief Bowl was killed; Burleson sent Chief Bowl's hat, which was a gift from Houston, to Houston, which enraged him. Not only this, but Burleson also did not support Houston's desire for an attack on Mexico. They did, however, professionally cooperate during Burleson's vice presidency under Houston.

Burleson was also involved in the Mexican–American War (1846–1848), after Texas was annexed by the U.S.

The location of his grave is in what later became the Texas State Cemetery, in Austin.

== Private life ==
Edward Burleson married Sarah Griffen Owen on April 25, 1816, in Madison County, Alabama.

In May 1830, Burleson arrived at San Felipe de Austin as a prospective settler. After scouting the land around the upper Colorado River, Burleson submitted an application to be a colonist. He then returned to Tennessee, where the rest of his family was living at the time, and brought them to Texas. Upon their arrival, Burleson and his family settled near the fledgling community of Bastrop. In the ensuing years, Burleson would become heavily involved with local affairs affecting Bastrop, Gonzales, and Fayette Counties, as he was elected to the Texas Senate in September 1838.

== Memorials ==
- Burleson County, Texas

== See also ==
- Edward Burleson Raymond, named after Edward Burleson

Political offices
Preceded by David G. Burnet	Vice President of the Republic of Texas; 1841–1844	Succeeded by Kenneth L. Anderson
Texas Senate
Preceded by None	Texas State Senator from District 15; 1846–1849	Succeeded by Wilds K. Cooke
Preceded by Robert McAlpin Williamson	Texas State Senator from District 16; 1849–1851	Succeeded by William S. Day
Preceded by H. Clay Davis	Texas State Senator from District 21; 1851	Succeeded by John Salmon "Rip" Ford
Preceded by None	President pro tempore of the Texas Senate; 1846–1851	Succeeded by Jesse Grimes
