= Texas's 21st Senate district =

American legislative district

Texas's 21st State Senate district
Senator
Judith Zaffirini; D–Laredo
- Demographics: 22.6% White; 4.1% Black; 72.3% Hispanic; 1.2% Asian
- Population: 888,624

District 21 of the Texas Senate is a senatorial district that currently serves all of Caldwell, Dimmit, Duval, Jim Hogg, Karnes, La Salle, Live Oak, McMullen, Starr, Webb, Wilson, and Zapata counties and portions of Bexar, Guadalupe, Hays, Travis counties in the U.S. state of Texas.

The current senator from District 21 is Judith Zaffirini.

== Biggest cities in the district ==
District 21 has a population of 807,460 with 567,099 that is at voting age from the 2010 census.

	Name	County	Pop. (Note: Population is based on the number of people in the district in that city, not the overall population of that city)
1	Laredo	Webb	236,091
2	Austin	Travis	129,085
3	San Marcos	Caldwell/Hays/Guadalupe	24,197
4	Seguin	Guadalupe	23,620
5	Portland	San Patricio	15,099

== Election history ==
Election history of District 21 from 1992. (Note: Uncontested primary elections are not shown.)

=== 2022 ===
Texas general election, 2022: Senate District 21
Party	Candidate	Votes	%	±%
Democratic	Judith Zaffirini (Incumbent)	129,832	61.56	+1.42
Republican	Julie Dahlberg	75,799	35.94	−3.92
Libertarian	Arthur Dibianca	5,282	2.50	+2.50
Turnout		210,913	100.00	
Democratic hold				

=== 2020 ===
Texas general election, 2020: Senate District 21
Party	Candidate	Votes	%	±%
Democratic	Judith Zaffirini (Incumbent)	167,672	60.14	−39.86
Republican	Frank Pomeroy	111,142	39.86	+39.86
Turnout		278,814	100.00	
Democratic hold				

=== 2016 ===
Texas general election, 2016: Senate District 21
Party	Candidate	Votes	%	±%
Democratic	Judith Zaffirini (Incumbent)	160,959	100.00	
Turnout		160,959		
Democratic hold				

=== 2012 ===
Texas General Election 2012: Senate District 21
Candidate		Votes	%	±
	Republican - Grant Rostig	55,933	29.17	+0.02
	Libertarian - Joseph Morse	6,128	3.20	+0.59
✓	Democrat - Judith Zaffirini (Incumbent)	129,681	67.63	-0.61
Turnout		191,742		+1

=== 2008 ===
Texas General Election 2008: Senate District 21
Candidate		Votes	%	±
	Republican - Louis H. Bruni	55,363	29.15	
	Libertarian - Barry L. Allison	4,966	2.61	
✓	Democrat - Judith Zaffirini (Incumbent)	129,608	68.24	
Turnout		189,937		

Democratic primary, 2008: Senate District 21
Candidate		Votes	%	±
	Rene Barrientos	23,262	21.4	
✓	Judith Zaffirini (Incumbent)	108,572	78.6	
Turnout		131,834		

=== 2004 ===
Texas general election, 2004: Senate District 21
Party	Candidate	Votes	%	±%
Democratic	Judith Zaffirini (Incumbent)	127,573	100.00	+10.89
Majority		127,573	100.00	+21.78
Turnout		127,573		+18.86
Democratic hold				

Democratic primary, 2004: Senate District 21
Candidate		Votes	%	±
	Raymond Bruni	17,089	21.35	
✓	Judith Zaffirini (Incumbent)	62,960	78.65	
Majority		45,871	57.30	
Turnout		80,049		

=== 2002 ===
Texas general election, 2002: Senate District 21
Party	Candidate	Votes	%	±%
Democratic	Judith Zaffirini (Incumbent)	95,644	89.11	+22.65
Libertarian	Jeff Carruthers	11,688	10.89	+10.89
Majority		83,956	78.22	+45.31
Turnout		107,332		−32.76
Democratic hold				

=== 2000 ===
Texas general election, 2000: Senate District 21
Party	Candidate	Votes	%	±%
Republican	David Swift	53,547	33.54	−0.14
Democratic	Judith Zaffirini (Incumbent)	106,089	66.46	+0.14
Majority		52,542	32.91	+0.27
Turnout		159,636		+15.13
Democratic hold				

=== 1996 ===
Texas general election, 1996: Senate District 21
Party	Candidate	Votes	%	±%
Republican	James C. Whitworth	46,698	33.68	+2.21
Democratic	Judith Zaffirini (Incumbent)	91,956	66.32	−2.21
Majority		45,258	32.64	−4.41
Turnout		138,654		+33.77
Democratic hold				

=== 1994 ===
Texas general election, 1994: Senate District 21
Party	Candidate	Votes	%	±%
Democratic	Judith Zaffirini (Incumbent)	71,029	68.53	−31.47
Republican	Fernando Cantu	32,624	31.47	+31.47
Majority		38,405	37.05	−62.95
Turnout		103,653		−6.95
Democratic hold				

=== 1992 ===
Texas general election, 1992: Senate District 21
Party	Candidate	Votes	%	±%
Democratic	Judith Zaffirini (Incumbent)	111,398	100.00	
Majority		111,398	100.00	
Turnout		111,398		
Democratic hold				

== District officeholders ==
Legislature	Senator, District 21	Counties in District
3	H. Clay Davis	Cameron, Starr, Webb.
4	Edward Burleson; John Salmon "Rip" Ford	Gillespie, Hays, Travis.
5	Elliot McNeil Millican	Brazos, Burleson, Leon, Robertson.
6	Elliot McNeil Millican	Brazos, Burleson, Leon, Robertson.
7	Elliot McNeil Millican; David M. Whaley	Brazos, Burleson, Leon, Robertson.
8	David M. Whaley	Brazos, Burleson, Leon, Robertson.
9	Robert H. Graham	Archer, Baylor, Buchanan, Clay, Cooke, Denton, Hardeman, Haskell, Jack, Jones, Knox, Montague, Throckmorton, Wichita, Wilbarger, Young.
10	Daniel Montague	Archer, Baylor, Clay, Cooke, Denton, Hardeman, Haskell, Jack, Jones, Knox, Montague, Stephens, Throckmorton, Wichita, Wilbarger, Wise, Young.
11	J. M. Blount	Archer, Baylor, Clay, Cooke, Denton, Hardeman, Haskell, Jack, Jones, Knox, Montague, Stephens, Throckmorton, Wichita, Wilbarger, Wise, Young.
12	Samuel Evans	Collin, Dallas, Tarrant.
13	Samuel Evans	Collin, Dallas, Tarrant.
14	Robert D. Allison	Collin, Denton, Wise.
15	William M. Brown	Bell, Falls, Milam.
16	William M. Brown	Bell, Falls, Milam.
17	Andrew Jackson Harris	Bell, Falls, Milam.
18	William H. Getzendaner	Ellis, Hill, Johnson.
19	William H. Getzendaner	Ellis, Hill, Johnson.
20	Samuel C. Upshaw	Ellis, Hill, Johnson.
21	Samuel C. Upshaw	Ellis, Hill, Johnson.
22	Martin McNulty Crane	Ellis, Hill, Johnson.
23	William Oscar Hutchison	Blanco, Caldwell, Comal, Gonzales, Guadalupe, Hays.
24	Joseph Burton Dibrell, Jr.	Blanco, Caldwell, Comal, Gonzales, Guadalupe, Hays.
25	Joseph Burton Dibrell, Jr.	Blanco, Caldwell, Comal, Gonzales, Guadalupe, Hays.
26	Joseph Burton Dibrell, Jr.	Blanco, Caldwell, Comal, Gonzales, Guadalupe, Hays.
27	Joseph Burton Dibrell, Jr.	Blanco, Caldwell, Comal, Gonzales, Guadalupe, Hays.
28	Joseph Faust	Blanco, Caldwell, Comal, Gonzales, Guadalupe, Hays.
29	Joseph Faust	Blanco, Caldwell, Comal, Gonzales, Guadalupe, Hays.
30	Joseph Faust	Blanco, Caldwell, Comal, Gonzales, Guadalupe, Hays.
31	Ferdinand C. Weinert	Blanco, Caldwell, Comal, Gonzales, Guadalupe, Hays.
32	Ferdinand C. Weinert	Blanco, Caldwell, Comal, Gonzales, Guadalupe, Hays.
33	Ferdinand C. Weinert; James A. Harley	Blanco, Caldwell, Comal, Gonzales, Guadalupe, Hays.
34	James A. Harley	Blanco, Caldwell, Comal, Gonzales, Guadalupe, Hays.
35	James A. Harley; Martin Faust	Blanco, Caldwell, Comal, Gonzales, Guadalupe, Hays.
36	Martin Faust	Blanco, Caldwell, Comal, Gonzales, Guadalupe, Hays.
37	Cyrus Richards; Alvin J. Wirtz	Blanco, Caldwell, Comal, Gonzales, Guadalupe, Hays.
38	Alvin J. Wirtz	Blanco, Caldwell, Comal, Gonzales, Guadalupe, Hays.
39	Carl C. Hardin	Bell, Bosque, Coryell, Erath, Hamilton.
40	Carl C. Hardin	Bell, Bosque, Coryell, Erath, Hamilton.
41	Carl C. Hardin	Bell, Bosque, Coryell, Erath, Hamilton.
42	Carl C. Hardin	Bell, Bosque, Coryell, Erath, Hamilton.
43	Roy Sanderford	Bell, Bosque, Coryell, Erath, Hamilton.
44	Roy Sanderford	Bell, Bosque, Coryell, Erath, Hamilton.
45	James Manley Head	Bell, Bosque, Coryell, Erath, Hamilton.
46	James Manley Head	Bell, Bosque, Coryell, Erath, Hamilton.
47	Karl Lovelady	Bell, Bosque, Coryell, Erath, Hamilton.
48	Karl Lovelady	Bell, Bosque, Coryell, Erath, Hamilton.
49	Buster Brown	Bell, Bosque, Coryell, Erath, Hamilton.
50	Buster Brown	Bell, Bosque, Coryell, Erath, Hamilton.
51	William A. Shofner	Bell, Bosque, Coryell, Erath, Hamilton.
52	William A. Shofner	Bell, Bosque, Coryell, Erath, Hamilton.
53	Abraham "Chick" Kazen	Brooks, Dimmit, Duval, Jim Hogg, Jim Wells, La Salle, Maverick, Starr, Webb, Zapata.
54	Abraham "Chick" Kazen	Brooks, Dimmit, Duval, Jim Hogg, Jim Wells, La Salle, Maverick, Starr, Webb, Zapata.
55	Abraham "Chick" Kazen	Brooks, Dimmit, Duval, Jim Hogg, Jim Wells, La Salle, Maverick, Starr, Webb, Zapata.
56	Abraham "Chick" Kazen	Brooks, Dimmit, Duval, Jim Hogg, Jim Wells, La Salle, Maverick, Starr, Webb, Zapata.
57	Abraham "Chick" Kazen	Brooks, Dimmit, Duval, Jim Hogg, Jim Wells, La Salle, Maverick, Starr, Webb, Zapata.
58	Abraham "Chick" Kazen	Brooks, Dimmit, Duval, Jim Hogg, Jim Wells, La Salle, Maverick, Starr, Webb, Zapata.
59	Abraham "Chick" Kazen	Brooks, Dimmit, Duval, Jim Hogg, Jim Wells, La Salle, Maverick, Starr, Webb, Zapata.
60	Wayne Connally	All of Atascosa, Bee, Brooks, Dimmit, Duval, Frio, Goliad, Jim Hogg, Jim Wells, Karnes, La Salle, Live Oak, Maverick, McMullen, Medina, Refugio, Starr, Webb, Wilson, Zapata, Zavala. Portion of Bexar.
61	Wayne Connally	All of Atascosa, Bee, Brooks, Dimmit, Duval, Frio, Goliad, Jim Hogg, Jim Wells, Karnes, La Salle, Live Oak, Maverick, McMullen, Medina, Refugio, Starr, Webb, Wilson, Zapata, Zavala. Portion of Bexar.
62	Wayne Connally	All of Atascosa, Bee, Brooks, Dimmit, Duval, Frio, Goliad, Jim Hogg, Jim Wells, Karnes, La Salle, Live Oak, Maverick, McMullen, Medina, Refugio, Starr, Webb, Wilson, Zapata, Zavala. Portion of Bexar.
63	John Traeger	All of Atascosa, Dimmit, Duval, Frio, Guadalupe, Jim Hogg, La Salle, Live Oak, Maverick, McMullen, Medina, Starr, Webb, Wilson, Zapata, Zavala. Portion of Bexar.
64	John Traeger	All of Atascosa, Dimmit, Duval, Frio, Guadalupe, Jim Hogg, La Salle, Live Oak, Maverick, McMullen, Medina, Starr, Webb, Wilson, Zapata, Zavala. Portion of Bexar.
65	John Traeger	All of Atascosa, Dimmit, Duval, Frio, Guadalupe, Jim Hogg, La Salle, Live Oak, Maverick, McMullen, Medina, Starr, Webb, Wilson, Zapata, Zavala. Portion of Bexar.
66	John Traeger	All of Atascosa, Dimmit, Duval, Frio, Guadalupe, Jim Hogg, La Salle, Live Oak, Maverick, McMullen, Medina, Starr, Webb, Wilson, Zapata, Zavala. Portion of Bexar.
67	John Traeger	All of Atascosa, Dimmit, Duval, Frio, Guadalupe, Jim Hogg, La Salle, Live Oak, Maverick, McMullen, Medina, Starr, Webb, Wilson, Zapata, Zavala. Portion of Bexar.
68	John Traeger	All of Atascosa, Bee, Comal, Dimmit, Duval, Frio, Guadalupe, Jim Hogg, La Salle, Live Oak, Maverick, McMullen, Starr, Webb, Wilson, Zapata, Zavala. Portion of Bexar.
69	John Traeger	All of Atascosa, Bee, Comal, Dimmit, Duval, Frio, Guadalupe, Jim Hogg, La Salle, Live Oak, Maverick, McMullen, Starr, Webb, Wilson, Zapata, Zavala. Portion of Bexar.
70	Judith Zaffirini	All of Atascosa, Bee, Dimmit, Duval, Frio, Guadalupe, Jim Hogg, Kinney, La Salle, Live Oak, Maverick, McMullen, Starr, Uvalde, Webb, Wilson, Zapata, Zavala. Portions of Bexar, Comal.
71	Judith Zaffirini	All of Atascosa, Bee, Dimmit, Duval, Frio, Guadalupe, Jim Hogg, Kinney, La Salle, Live Oak, Maverick, McMullen, Starr, Uvalde, Webb, Wilson, Zapata, Zavala. Portions of Bexar, Comal.
72	Judith Zaffirini	All of Atascosa, Bee, Dimmit, Duval, Frio, Guadalupe, Jim Hogg, Kinney, La Salle, Live Oak, Maverick, McMullen, Starr, Uvalde, Webb, Wilson, Zapata, Zavala. Portions of Bexar, Comal.
73	Judith Zaffirini	All of Bee, Brewster, Culberson, Dimmit, Duval, Frio, Jeff Davis, Jim Hogg, Kinney, La Salle, Live Oak, Maverick, McMullen, Medina, Pecos, Presidio, Reeves, Starr, Terrell, Uvalde, Val Verde, Webb, Wilson, Zapata, Zavala. Portions of Bexar, Comal, El Paso.
74	Judith Zaffirini	All of Bee, Dimmit, Duval, Frio, Jim Hogg, La Salle, Live Oak, McMullen, Starr, Webb, Wilson, Zapata, Zavala. Portions of Atascosa, Bexar, Comal, Guadalupe, Hidalgo, Uvalde.
75	Judith Zaffirini	All of Bee, Dimmit, Duval, Frio, Jim Hogg, La Salle, Live Oak, McMullen, Starr, Webb, Wilson, Zapata, Zavala. Portions of Atascosa, Bexar, Comal, Guadalupe, Hidalgo, Uvalde.
76	Judith Zaffirini	All of Bee, Dimmit, Duval, Frio, Jim Hogg, La Salle, Live Oak, McMullen, Starr, Webb, Wilson, Zapata, Zavala. Portions of Atascosa, Bexar, Comal, Guadalupe, Hidalgo, Uvalde.
77	Judith Zaffirini	All of Bee, Dimmit, Duval, Frio, Jim Hogg, La Salle, Live Oak, McMullen, Starr, Webb, Wilson, Zapata, Zavala. Portions of Atascosa, Bexar, Comal, Guadalupe, Hidalgo, Uvalde.
78	Judith Zaffirini	All of Atascosa, Bee, Dimmit, Duval, Frio, Jim Hogg, Karnes, La Salle, Live Oak, McMullen, San Patricio, Starr, Webb, Wilson, Zapata, Zavala. Portion of Bexar.
79	Judith Zaffirini	All of Atascosa, Bee, Dimmit, Duval, Frio, Jim Hogg, Karnes, La Salle, Live Oak, McMullen, San Patricio, Starr, Webb, Wilson, Zapata, Zavala. Portion of Bexar.
80	Judith Zaffirini	All of Atascosa, Bee, Dimmit, Duval, Frio, Jim Hogg, Karnes, La Salle, Live Oak, McMullen, San Patricio, Starr, Webb, Wilson, Zapata, Zavala. Portion of Bexar.
81	Judith Zaffirini	All of Atascosa, Bee, Dimmit, Duval, Frio, Jim Hogg, Karnes, La Salle, Live Oak, McMullen, San Patricio, Starr, Webb, Wilson, Zapata, Zavala. Portion of Bexar.
82	Judith Zaffirini	All of Atascosa, Bee, Dimmit, Duval, Frio, Jim Hogg, Karnes, La Salle, Live Oak, McMullen, San Patricio, Starr, Webb, Wilson, Zapata, Zavala. Portion of Bexar.
83	Judith Zaffirini	Bee, Caldwell, Duval, Jim Hogg, Karnes, La Salle, Live Oak, McMullen, San Patricio, Starr, Webb, Wilson, Zapata. Portions of Atascosa, Bexar, Guadalupe, Hays, Travis.
84	Judith Zaffirini	Bee, Caldwell, Duval, Jim Hogg, Karnes, La Salle, Live Oak, McMullen, San Patricio, Starr, Webb, Wilson, Zapata. Portions of Atascosa, Bexar, Guadalupe, Hays, Travis.
85	Judith Zaffirini	Bee, Caldwell, Duval, Jim Hogg, Karnes, La Salle, Live Oak, McMullen, San Patricio, Starr, Webb, Wilson, Zapata. Portions of Atascosa, Bexar, Guadalupe, Hays, Travis.
86	Judith Zaffirini	Bee, Caldwell, Duval, Jim Hogg, Karnes, La Salle, Live Oak, McMullen, San Patricio, Starr, Webb, Wilson, Zapata. Portions of Atascosa, Bexar, Guadalupe, Hays, Travis.
87	Judith Zaffirini	Bee, Caldwell, Duval, Jim Hogg, Karnes, La Salle, Live Oak, McMullen, San Patricio, Starr, Webb, Wilson, Zapata. Portions of Atascosa, Bexar, Guadalupe, Hays, Travis.
88	Judith Zaffirini	Caldwell, Dimmit, Duval, Jim Hogg, Karnes, La Salle, Live Oak, McMullen, Starr, Webb, Wilson, Zapata. Portions of Bexar, Guadalupe, Hays, Travis.
89	Judith Zaffirini	Caldwell, Dimmit, Duval, Jim Hogg, Karnes, La Salle, Live Oak, McMullen, Starr, Webb, Wilson, Zapata. Portions of Bexar, Guadalupe, Hays, Travis.
