= Judith Zaffirini =

American politician (born 1946)

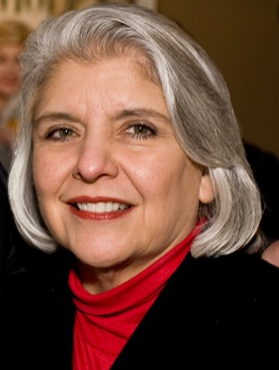
- Zaffirini in 2009

Member of the Texas Senate from the 21st district
- Incumbent
- Assumed office January 13, 1987
- Preceded by: John Traeger

Personal details
- Born: Judith Pappas; February 13, 1946 (age 80) Laredo, Texas, U.S.
- Party: Democratic
- Spouse: Carlos Zaffirini
- Children: 1
- Education: Laredo College; University of Houston; University of Texas, Austin (BA, MA, PhD)
- Website: Office website Campaign website

Judith Pappas Zaffirini (born February 13, 1946) is an American politician serving as a Democratic member of the Texas State Senate from the 21st District, which includes her home city of Laredo in south Texas. Zaffirini is the first female dean of the Texas Senate. Zaffirini has been named among the "Top 100 Most Influential Hispanics in the United States" by Hispanic Business magazine. Zaffirini is the first Mexican American woman elected to the Texas Senate.

== Background ==
A graduate of the University of Texas at Austin, Zaffirini studied two summers at Laredo Community College (then Laredo Junior College). In 1977, Zaffirini became an associate of the Women's Institute for Freedom of the Press (WIFP). WIFP is an American nonprofit publishing organization. The organization works to increase communication between women and connect the public with forms of women-based media.

== Elections ==
In 1994, she won more than two thirds of the ballots cast in the general election against the Republican candidate, Fernando G. Cantu Jr. (1944–2016), 71,029 (68.5 percent to 32,624 (31.5%). In the Democratic primary held on March 4, 2008, Zaffirini was to have faced San Antonio attorney Rene Barrientos but Barrientos withdrew from the race. His name, however, remained on the ballot, and he did some advertising. Zaffirini won the nomination, 108,572 votes (78.6 percent); Barrientos, 23,262 (21.4 percent).

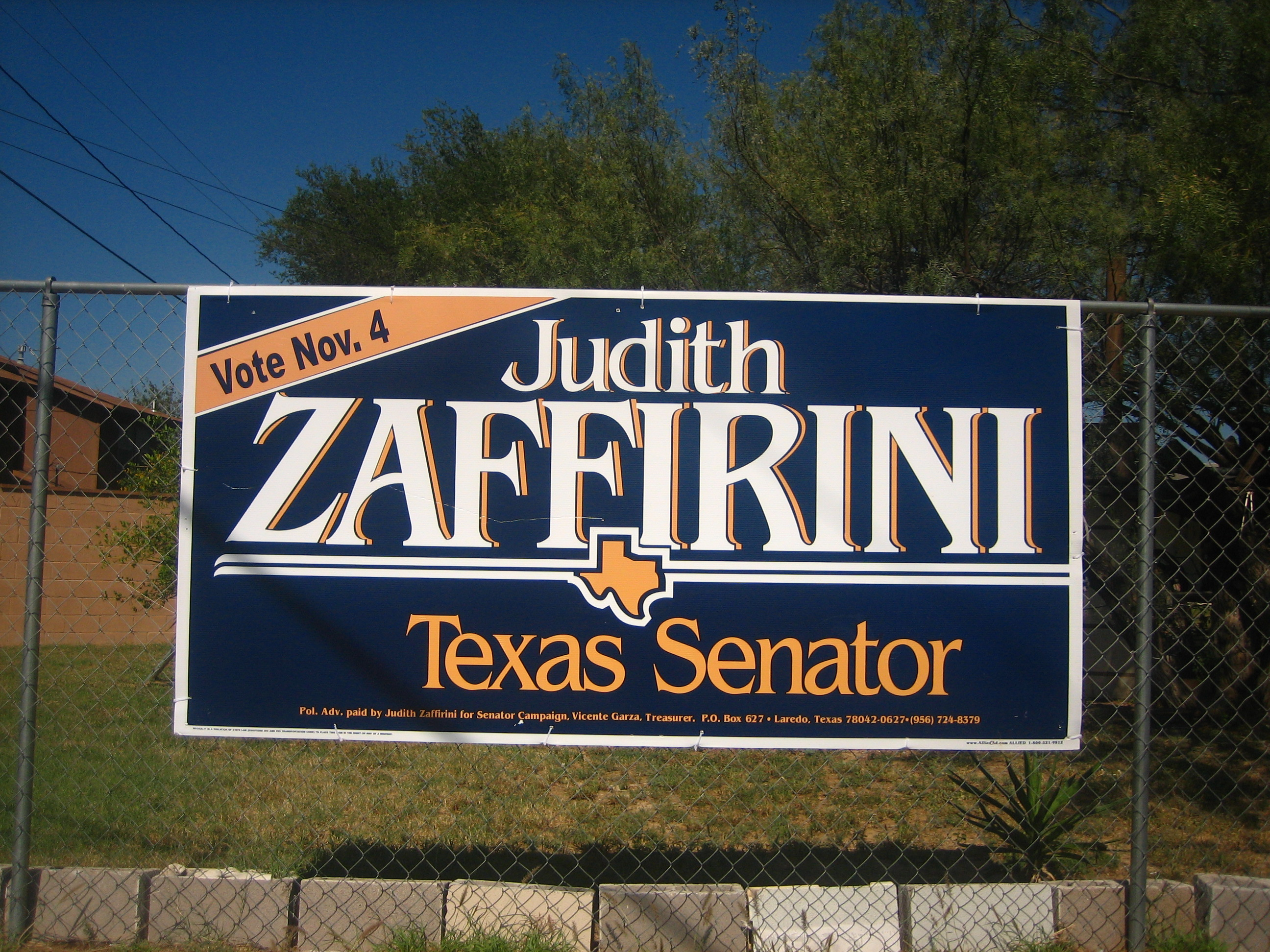
Zaffirini campaign sign for the Texas State Senate.

In the 2012 general election, Zaffirini handily defeated the Republican candidate, Grant Elliot Rostig (born c. 1958) of Lockhart in Caldwell County, a supporter of the Ron Paul presidential campaign, 2012, who was endorsed by the Republican Liberty Caucus. Zaffirini received 129,894 votes (67.6 percent) to Rostig's 56,032 (29.2 percent). The remaining 3.2 percent of the vote went to the Libertarian nominee, Joseph Morse.

== Legislative tenure ==
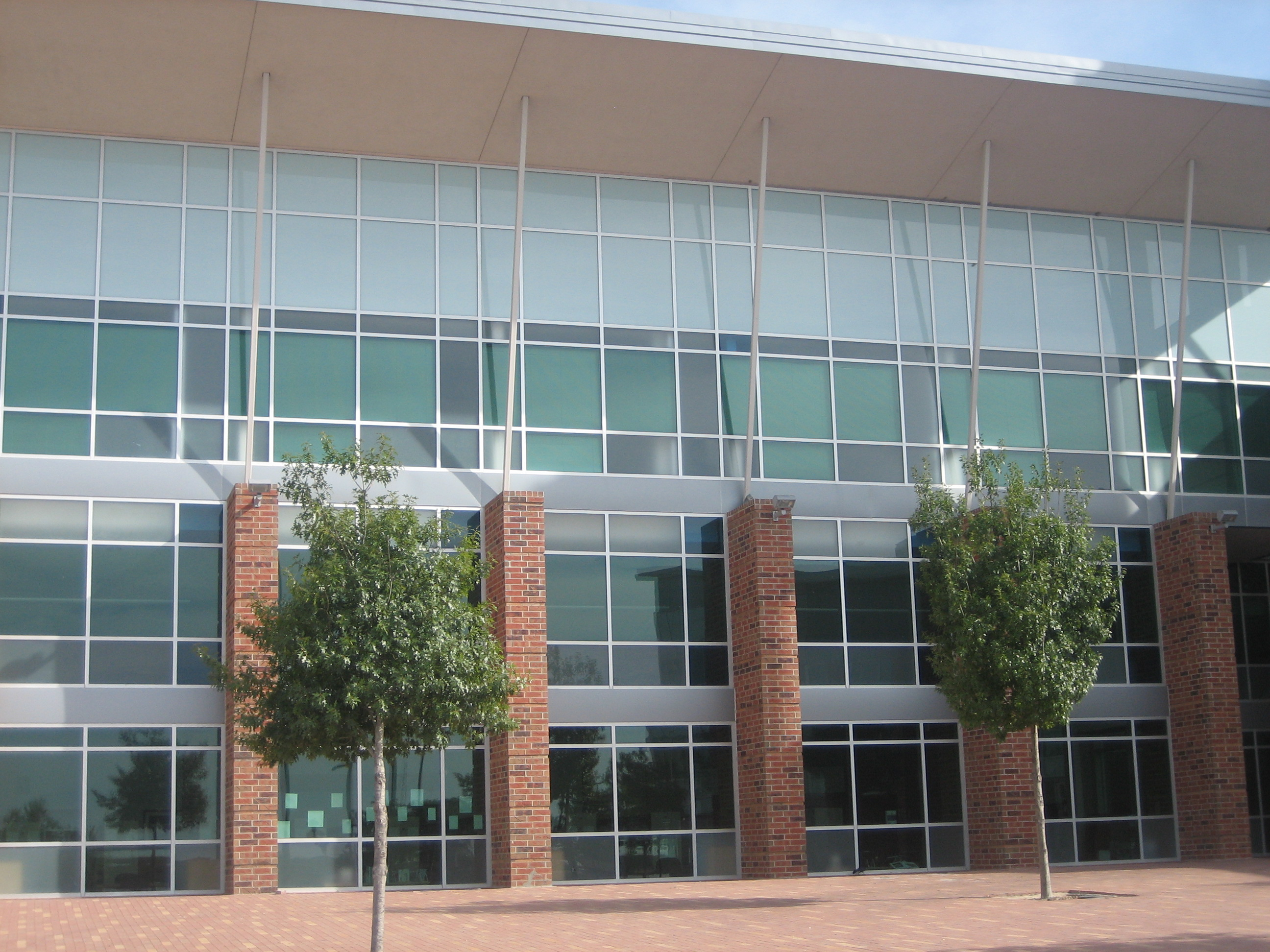
The Senator Judith Zaffirini Library at Laredo Community College South Campus in Laredo, Texas.

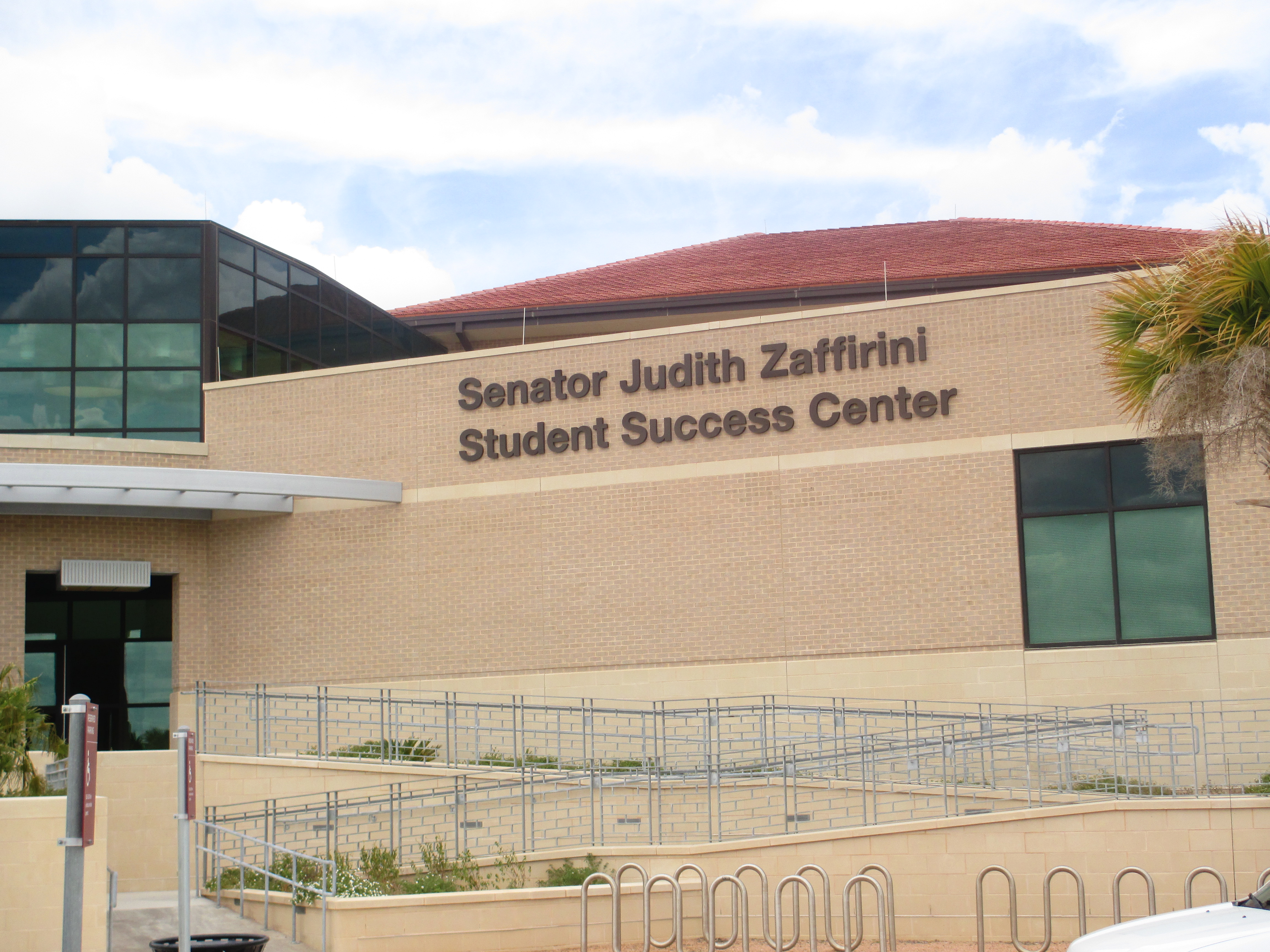
The Senator Judith Zaffirini Student Success Center at Texas A&M International University in Laredo was dedicated in September 2012, with Governor Rick Perry and Lieutenant Governor David Dewhurst in attendance.

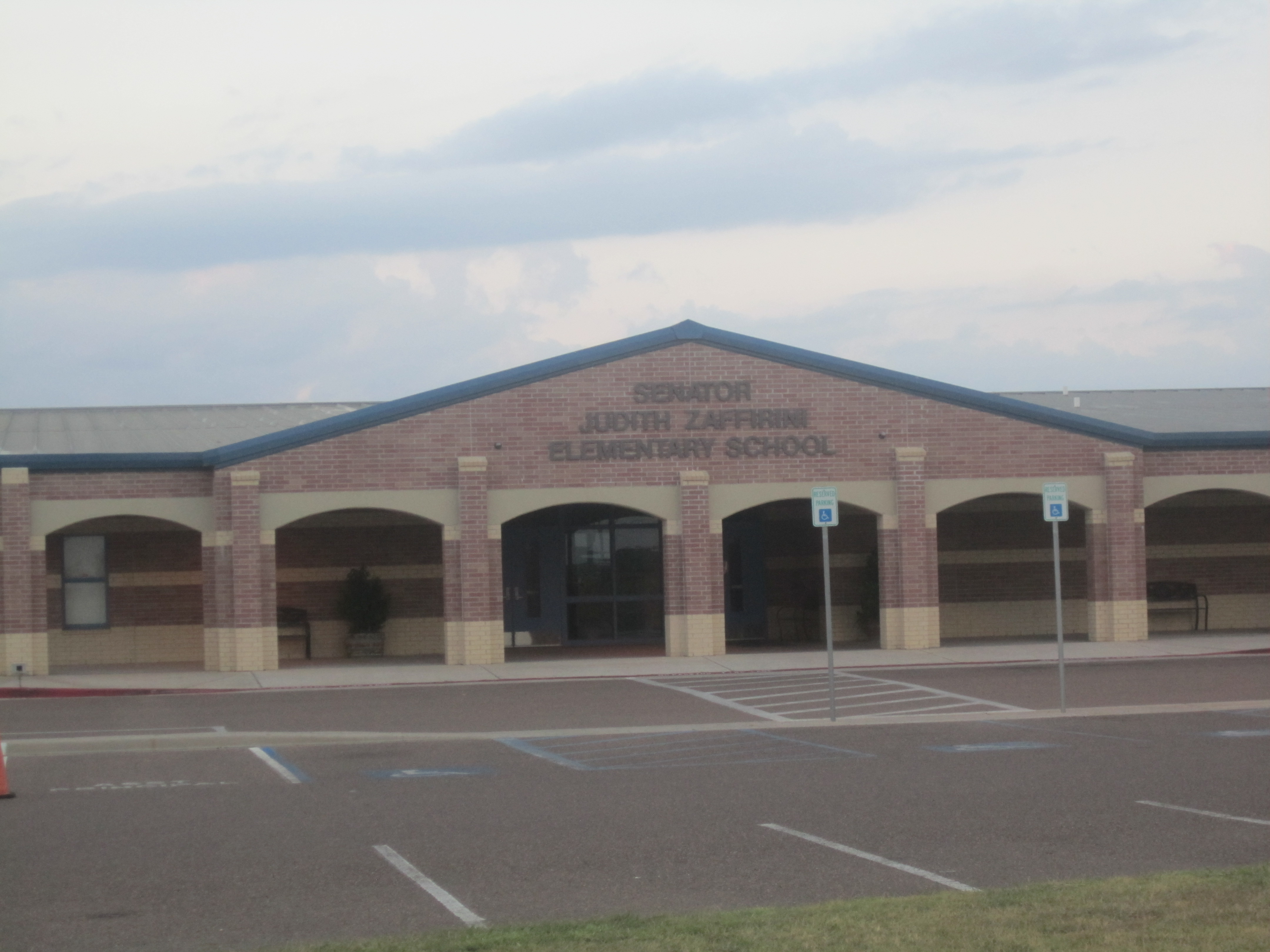
The Senator Judith Zaffirini Elementary School is located off Texas State Highway 359 in east Laredo.

Zaffirini has a 100 percent voting record, having through 2025 cast more than seventy-five thousand consecutive votes since January 1987. She even once missed her son's graduation to maintain the record.

On January 9, 2007, Zaffirini became the second in seniority in the 31-member Texas Senate, of which she has been a member since 1987.

In 2011, Zaffirini voted against the state appropriations bill because it reduced funding for public education by $5.4 billion, including $1.4 billion for targeted programs, such as pre-kindergarten expansion grants, one of her favorite programs. In 2013, Zaffirini will push for the issuance of tuition revenue bonds to fund capital construction projects on state college and university campuses, including TAMIU in Laredo.

In 2012, Lieutenant Governor Dewhurst removed Zaffirini from the chairmanship of the Senate Committee on Higher Education in favor of Kel Seliger, a Republican from Amarillo. Instead Zaffirini chairs the Senate Committee on Government Organization. She will remain a member of the higher education committee under Seliger and will continue as the co-chair of the Oversight Committee on Higher Education Governance Excellence and Transparency. Zaffirini said that she will continue to influence higher education policy "but the only difference is that the gavel won't be in my hand."

In July 2013, Zaffirini joined her Democratic colleagues in voting against Republican-sponsored legislation which passed the Senate, 19 to 11, to reduce from twenty-six to twenty weeks of gestation the maximum time limit during which a woman can procure an abortion. Zaffirini, who is anti-abortion, describes the new law as not anti-abortion, per se, but one that limits a woman's access to health care and fails to address the question of unintended pregnancies. Zaffirini said that she does "not believe that an unborn child can feel pain at twenty weeks. Nevertheless that had nothing to do with my position. ..." Zaffirini said, "Like it or not abortion is the law of the land, and because it is we must insure that women have access to safe and legal abortions. If they do not, then they will resort to coat hangers and self-aborting and illegal abortions, and that is wrong." Opponents of the law, such as Senator Royce West of Dallas, vowed a court challenge.

On March 8, 2017, Zaffirini was the only dissenter in an eight-to-one vote of the Senate State Affairs Committee of the bathroom bill, Senate Bill 6, introduced by her Republican colleague, Lois Kolkhorst of Brenham and strongly pushed by Lieutenant Governor Dan Patrick, the Republican presiding officer of the Senate. The bill would require persons to use public restrooms corresponding to their genitalia at birth. Strongly opposed by business and athletic interests, the measure is now pending before the Texas House of Representatives. Opponents of the measure have put their hopes in Moderate Republican Joe Straus of San Antonio, the House Speaker, who is known to be lukewarm or even hostile toward the measure.

In the 2017 legislative session, Zaffirini claimed her greatest numerical success record yet. Of the 168 bills that she introduced, 108 (64 percent) passed. Lawmakers introduced 6,631 bills but sent fewer, 1,211 (18 percent), to the governor than they have done since 1997 in the third year of the administration of Governor George W. Bush. According to the Texas Senate, as of 2025, Zaffirini has helped pass over 1,400 bills, the most in state history.

Zaffririni became the first female dean of the Texas Senate on December 30, 2023, when Sen. John Whitmire resigned.

== Civil lawsuits ==
In July 2013, Zaffirini was twice sued in Bexar County for alleged "gross mismanagement" of an estate valued at $150 million. The sisters, Josefina Alexander Gonzalez (1914–2014) and Delfina E. Alexander (died 2008), together owned about one thousand acres in South Texas. Between 1995 and 2002, five companies were organized to develop the property, but some of the businesses have long been inactive. The sisters further formed the Delfina and Josephina Alexander Family Trust designed to pass the proceeds of the holdings to Gonzalez's daughter, Rocio G. Guerra, and Gonzalez's two grandchildren. The second suit alleges that Zaffirini and two co-defendants, David H. Arredondo and Clarissa N. Chapa, committed tax fraud, forged documents, and paid themselves excessive fees in the amount of $420,000 for management of the Alexander holdings. The defendants are also accused of withholding money from the trust. Zaffirini's attorney-husband, Carlos Zaffirini Sr., said that Guerra and her children, have tried to break the trust on four occasions and that the basic issue centers on squabbling among the heirs over the collection of the money. Josefina Alexander Gonzales died in December 2014, five days before her 100th birthday.

In August 2016, the longstanding case was resolved without going to trial. Zaffirini delivered $35 million in cash and land to three Alexander family trusts that benefit Rocio Guerra, Zaffirini's second cousin, and Guerra's two children. The three are the sole heirs to the Alexander estate. In return, Zaffirini will take control of nearly 450 acres of undeveloped real estate off Del Mar Boulevard. Zaffirini will continue to serve as an executor and trustee of certain entities of the Alexander estate.

== Criticism of Donald Trump ==
On the occasion of Republican presidential candidate Donald Trump's visit to Laredo on July 23, 2015, Zaffrini wrote the lead column on the editorial page the next day in the Laredo Morning Times to question Trump's commitment to border issues.

== Electoral history ==
Election history of Zaffirini since 1992.

=== 2008 ===
Texas General Election, 2008: Senate District 21
Party	Candidate	Votes	%
Democratic	Judith Zaffirini (Incumbent)	129,608	68.2
Republican	Louis H. Bruni	55,363	29.2
Libertarian	Barry L. Allison	4,966	2.6
Total votes		189,937	100.0

Democratic primary, 2008: Senate District 21
Party	Candidate	Votes	%
Democratic	Judith Zaffirini (Incumbent)	108,572	78.6
Democratic	Rene Barrientos	23,262	21.4
Total votes		131,834	100.0

==== 2004 ====
Texas general election, 2004: Texas Senate, District 21
Party	Candidate	Votes	%
Democratic	Judith Zaffirini (Incumbent)	127,573	100.0
Total votes		127,573	100.0
Democratic hold			

Democratic primary, 2004: Senate District 21
Party	Candidate	Votes	%
Democratic	Judith Zaffirini (Incumbent)	62,960	78.65
Democratic	Raymond Bruni	17,089	21.35
Total votes		80,049	100.0

==== 2002 ====
Texas general election, 2002: Senate District 21
Party	Candidate	Votes	%
Democratic	Judith Zaffirini (Incumbent)	95,644	89.1
Libertarian	Jeff Carruthers	11,688	10.9
Total votes		107,332	100.0
Democratic hold			

==== 2000 ====
Texas general election, 2000: Senate District 21
Party	Candidate	Votes	%
Democratic	Judith Zaffirini (Incumbent)	106,089	66.5
Republican	David Swift	53,547	33.5
Total votes		159,636	100.0
Democratic hold			

==== 1996 ====
Texas general election, 1996: Senate District 21
Party	Candidate	Votes	%
Democratic	Judith Zaffirini (Incumbent)	91,956	66.3
Republican	James C. Whitworth	46,698	33.7
Total votes		138,654	100.0
Democratic hold			

==== 1994 ====
Texas general election, 1994: Senate District 21
Party	Candidate	Votes	%
Democratic	Judith Zaffirini (Incumbent)	71,029	68.5
Republican	Fernando Cantu Jr.	32,624	31.5
Total votes		103,653	100.0
Democratic hold			

==== 1992 ====
Texas general election, 1992: Senate District 21
Party	Candidate	Votes	%
Democratic	Judith Zaffirini (Incumbent)	111,398	100.0
Total votes		111,398	100.0
Democratic hold			

== See also ==
- History of the Mexican-Americans in Texas
