= Edward Burleson Raymond =

American politician (1848–1914)

Edward Burleson "E. B." Raymond (November 12, 1848 – October 19, 1914) was a lawyer, rancher, politician, banker, and founder of Raymondville, Texas.

Raymond, who was named after his father's friend Edward Burleson, was born in a log cabin on Congress Avenue in Austin, Texas to Nathaniel C. Raymond and Lucinda Riggs Raymond. His father was Secretary of State under Governor James Throckmorton, and Secretary of the Texas Senate.

E. B. Raymond came to South Texas on horseback in 1870. In his first years there, he herded cattle to Kansas. In 1874 he was hired by Richard King to open the new El Sauz division of the King Ranch. Raymond would serve as the manager of the El Sauz division for 37 years and was empowered to purchase land on King's behalf until 1882. In 1893, the El Sauz Post Office was established where Raymond served as the postmaster and telegraph operator. In 1898 he was elected Cameron County Commissioner, a position he held until 1910. In 1904, he joined with the King Ranch to deed the right of way to the St. Louis, Brownsville & Mexico Railway and donated a station site near his Las Majadas Ranch which was later named in his honor. In that same year he formed the Raymond Town and Improvement Company, was granted a post office, and began selling plots of land with Henrietta King. In 1907 he established the Raymondville State Bank where he served as president until his death. In addition, Raymond built a telephone exchange and cotton gin.

Raymondville became the county seat of Willacy County in 1921 when Kenedy County was split from Willacy.

Raymond was married to Juanita Rodriguez, and was the father of two sons. When Raymond died he left his 92,000-acre (370 km^{2}) Las Majadas Ranch to his two sons and wife.
