= Rio Grande City–Camargo International Bridge =

Bridge between Texas and Tamaulipas

Rio Grande City–Camargo International Bridge Puente Camargo
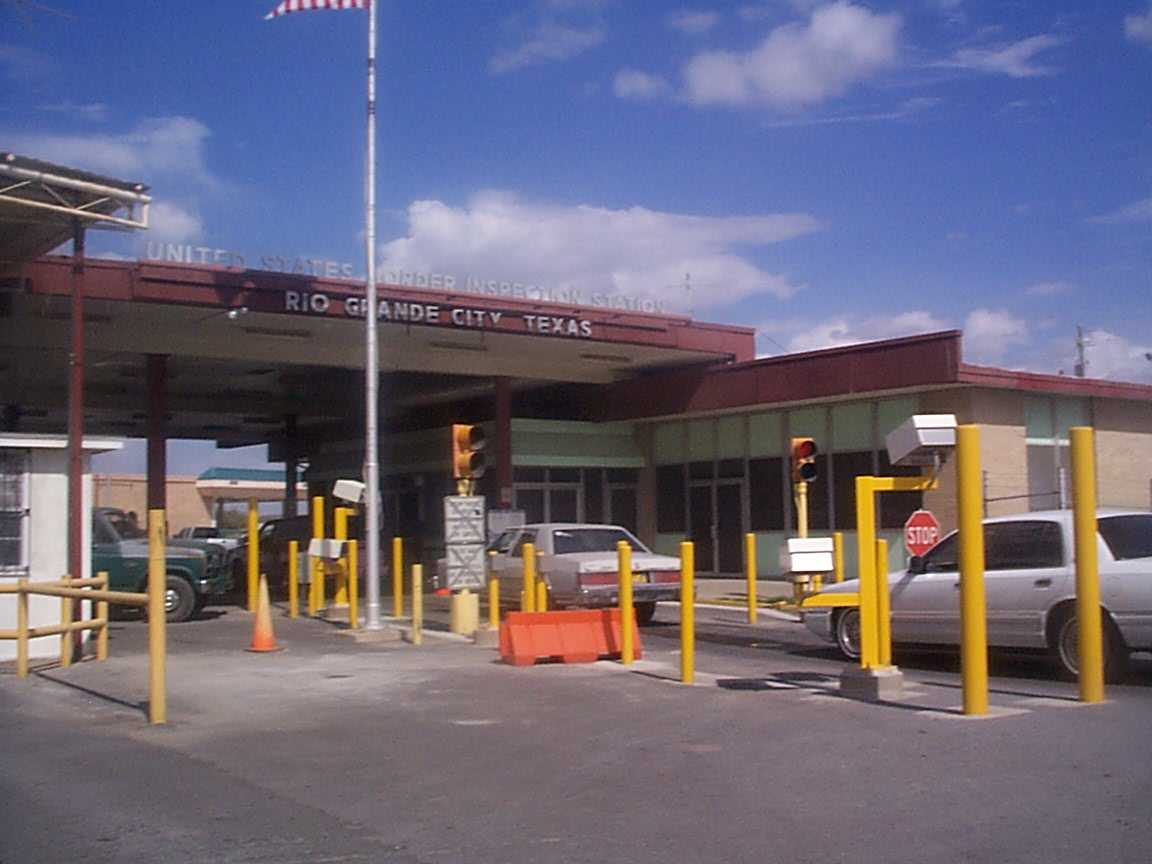
- Rio Grande City Border Inspection Station 1999
- Coordinates: 26°21′57″N 98°48′09″W
- Carries: 2 lanes of FM 755
- Crosses: Rio Grande
- Begins: Rio Grande City, Texas
- Ends: Camargo, Tamaulipas
- Official name: Starr – Camargo Bridge
- Owner: Starr Camargo Bridge Company

Characteristics
- Material: Steel girder
- Total length: 591 feet
- No. of lanes: 2

History
- Opened: 1966

Location
- Interactive map of Rio Grande City–Camargo International Bridge

The Rio Grande City – Camargo International Bridge is an international bridge along the United States–Mexico border between the U.S. state of Texas and the Mexican state of Tamaulipas. It is a crossing of the Rio Grande that connects the cities of Rio Grande City, Texas and Camargo, Tamaulipas. The bridge is also known as the Starr – Camargo Bridge and, in Spanish, Puente Camargo. It is the southern terminus of Farm to Market Road 755. The bridge is owned, operated and maintained by the Starr Camargo Bridge Company.

== Description ==
The two-lane steel girder bridge, which was completed and opened in 1966, is 591 feet (180 m) long. The bridge is owned and managed by the Starr Camargo Bridge Company based in Rio Grande City.

On the U.S. side, the crossing connects with Pete Diaz Avenue and Bridge Avenue, which provides access to U.S. Route 83. On the Mexican side the bridge connects with Carr Al Puente Internacional to Ciudad Camargo. Truckloads are restricted to 60 short tons (54,000 kg).

== Border crossing ==
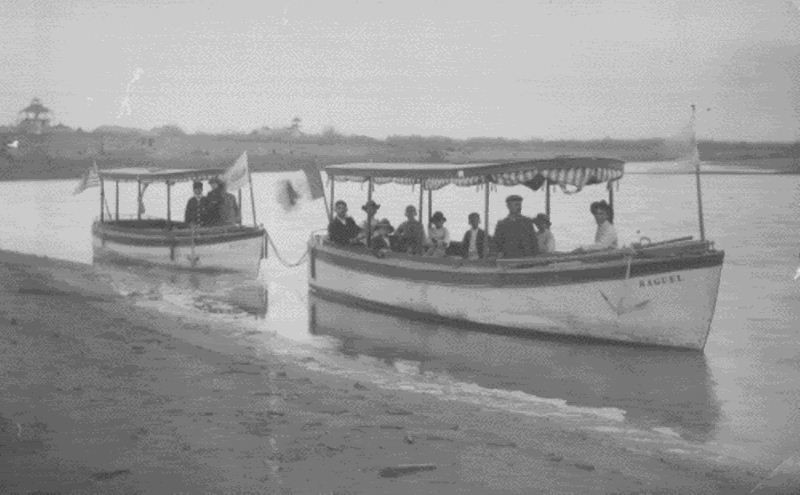
Ferry between Rio Grande City and Camargo in 1908

The Rio Grande City Port of Entry is located at the bridge.

For much of the 20th century, a small ferry operation connected the cities of Camargo and Rio Grande City. Finally in 1966, a bridge was built by the Starr Camargo Bridge Company. and a new border inspection station was built at that time. The station was upgraded in 2000.

== See also ==
- List of international bridges in North America
- List of Mexico–United States border crossings
