= Camargo Municipality, Tamaulipas =

Camargo
- Municipality
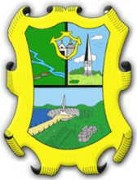
- Coat of arms

- Location within Tamaulipas Location within Mexico
- Coordinates: 26°18′56″N 98°50′00″W
- Country: Mexico
- State: Tamaulipas
- Municipal seat: Ciudad Camargo

Population (2010)
  - Total: 14,933

Camargo is a municipality in the Mexican state of Tamaulipas. It is located on the US border, across from Rio Grande City, Texas. It has an official population of 14,933 inhabitants (2010 census). The municipal seat is Ciudad Camargo, with a population of 7,984. The municipality is connected to Rio Grande City, Texas, via the Rio Grande City-Camargo International Bridge.

== History ==
The first settlement to be founded on the Lower Río Grande was that of Nuestra Señora de Santa Ana de Camargo. It was founded on March 5, 1749, with the dedication to Señora Santa Ana by captain Don Blas María de la Garza Falcón at the eastern edge of the San Juan River near its confluence with the Río Grande. The foundation had 85 families – a total of 531 persons. Most of the settlers for this township came from Cerralvo, Cadereyta, Monterrey and surrounding townships.

After establishing other towns in the interior of Mexico between Querétaro and the Gulf coast, José de Escandón arrived at Camargo on March 3, 1749. At the location called, "Paso del Azucar" on the Rio Grande, about two leagues southeast of the present site of Camargo, he met Captain Blas Maria de la Garza Falcón who already had been encamped there with forty other families and some soldiers. In the group led by Captain Blas Maria de la Garza Falcon were Miguel de la Garza Falcon, his brother, and Nicolas de los Santos Coy, father-in-law of Captain Falcon and ex-alcalde of nearby Cerralvo Municipality in Nuevo León.

These settlers were men of wealth who felt a need to risk all for greater gain. The town had already been laid out on the eastern bank of the San Juan River, not far from the Rio Grande, and temporary shelters made, jacales (straw huts). Father Fray Hierro, who had joined Escandon at Padilla and was a missionary from the college of Zacatecas, kept a diary which provides many interesting details concerning the establishment of the first settlements of the Lower Rio Grande Valley. Fourteen settlements were established in a six months period.

The settlers of this town were, as is evident from the captain's registry, generally Spaniards; they came in with some major and minor livestock: goats, sheep and mules.

A great flood in the year 1751 did some damage to the settlement, for which reason it was moved a little farther down the river to a higher site. An irrigation canal which had been built at the original location, because of their not having trimmed the opening to the canal with stone and mortar, was destroyed by the flood.

Following Texan independence and the commencement of the Mexican–American War, Camargo was occupied by the US army under the command of General Zachary Taylor on 14 July 1846. This river port served as a jumping off point for the invasion on Monterrey and Saltillo. The US Army was transported via steamboats from the mouth of the river area and Matamoros. Disease plagued the troops and it is said that thousand of US soldiers were buried here in unmarked graves.

On January 22, 2021, nineteen burned bodies were found in Camargo Municipality, likely victims of drug violence. As of February 3, two of the deceased were identified as Mexicans and two as Guatemalans, and twelve police officers were arrested. Sixteen of the bodies were identified as Guatemalan migrants and were returned to their country of origin in February 2021.

== Geography ==
=== Towns and villages ===
The largest localities (cities, towns, and villages) are:

Name	2010 Census Population
Ciudad Camargo 26°18′56″N 98°50′00″W	7,984
Comales 26°10′56″N 98°55′14″W	2,429
Nuevo Camargo	907
Nuevo Camargo (Villanueva)	420
Rancherías	404
San Francisco	384
Guardados de Abajo	326
López y Nuevo Cadillo	319
Santa Rosalía	229
Total Municipality	14,933

=== Adjacent municipalities and counties ===
- Gustavo Díaz Ordaz Municipality - southeast
- General Bravo Municipality, Nuevo León - southeast
- Doctor Coss Municipality, Nuevo León - southwest
- Miguel Alemán Municipality - northwest
- Starr County, Texas - north
