= Rio Grande City, Texas =

- City
- City of Rio Grande City
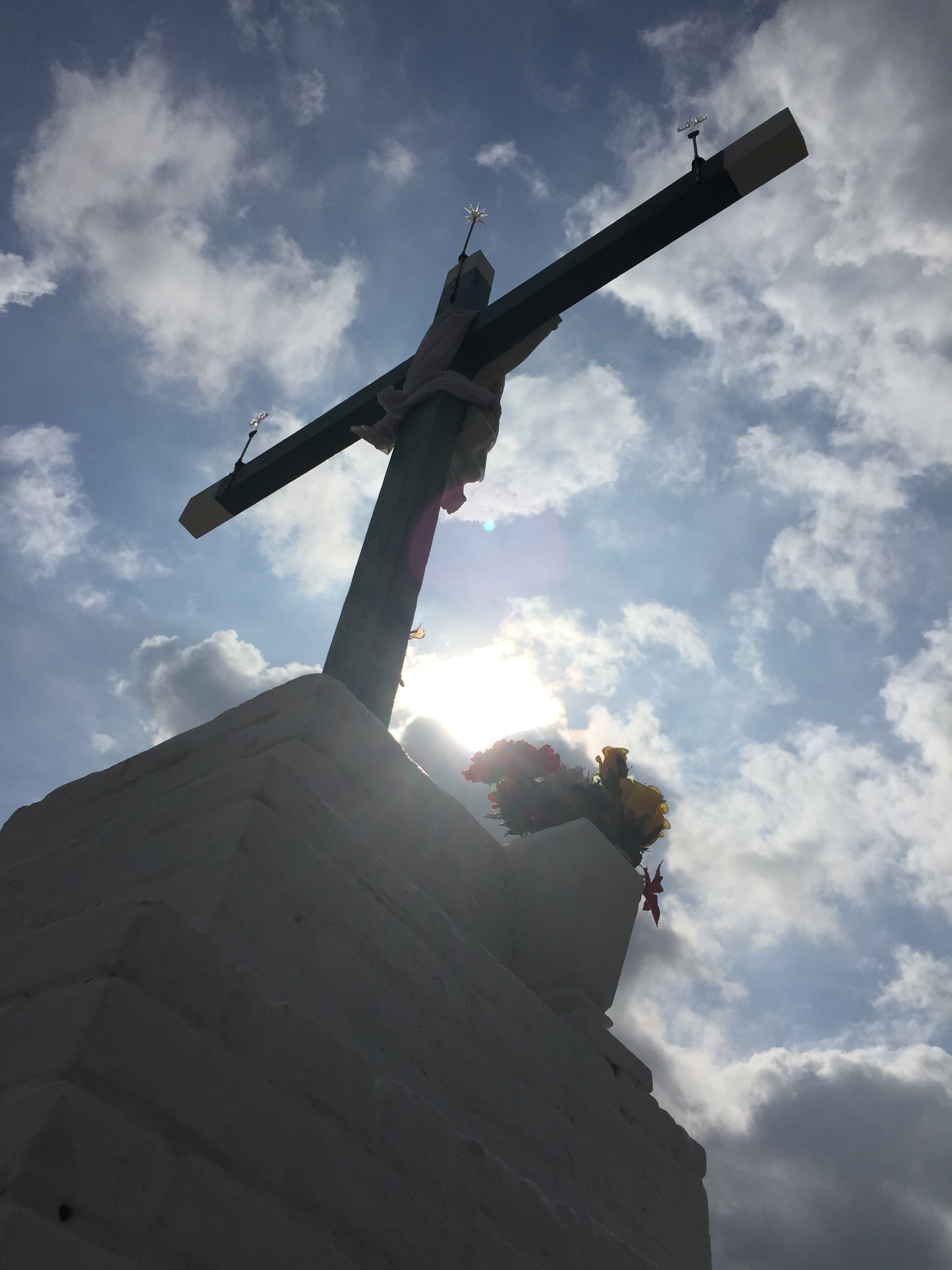
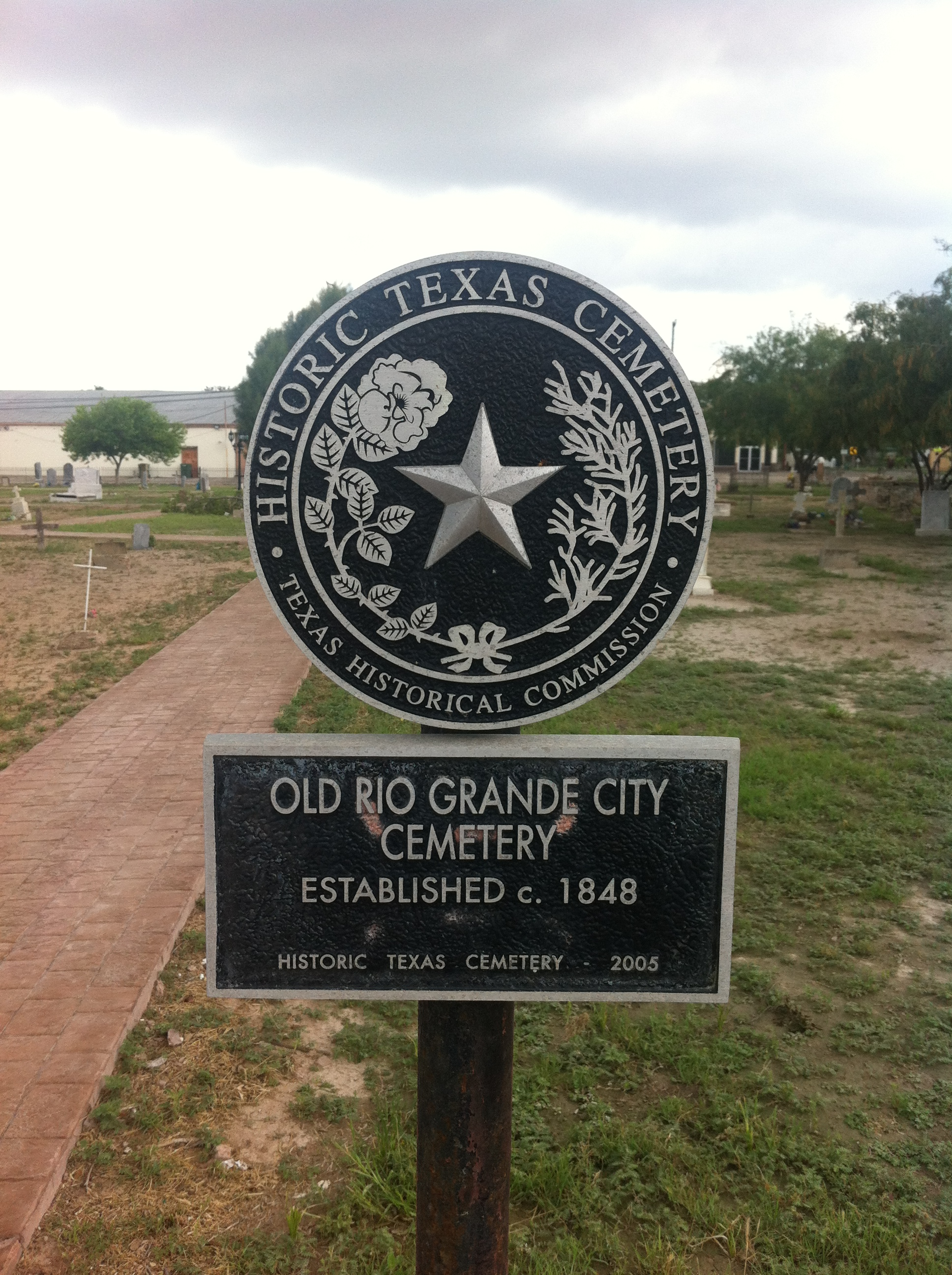
- Santa Cruz at Rio Grande City, Texas, Plaque describing the history of Rio Grande City, Texas, Plaque of the Old Rio Grande City Cemetery

- Seal
- Nickname: "RGC"
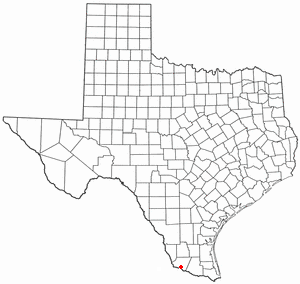
- Location of Rio Grande City in the U.S. state of Texas

- Location within Texas Location within the United States
- Coordinates: 26°22′50″N 98°49′6″W
- Country: United States
- State: Texas
- County: Starr
- Settled: 1846
- Founded: 1848
- Incorporated: May 1993

Government
  - Mayor: Gilberto Falcon
  - Police chief: Noe Castillo

Area
  - Total: 11.35 sq mi (29.40 km^{2})
  - Land: 11.35 sq mi (29.40 km^{2})
  - Water: 0 sq mi (0.00 km^{2})
- Elevation: 174 ft (53 m)

Population (2020)
  - Total: 15,317
  - Density: 1,349/sq mi (521.0/km^{2})
- Time zone: UTC-6 (Central (CST))
  - Summer (DST): UTC-5 (CDT)
- ZIP code: 78582
- Area code: 956
- FIPS code: 48-62168
- GNIS feature ID: 1388199
- Website: www.cityofrgc.com

Rio Grande City is a city in and the county seat of Starr County, Texas, United States. The population was 15,317 at the time of the 2020 census. The city is 41 miles (66 km) west of McAllen. It is connected to Camargo, Tamaulipas, via the Rio Grande City–Camargo International Bridge.

The city is situated within the Rio Grande Valley.

== History ==
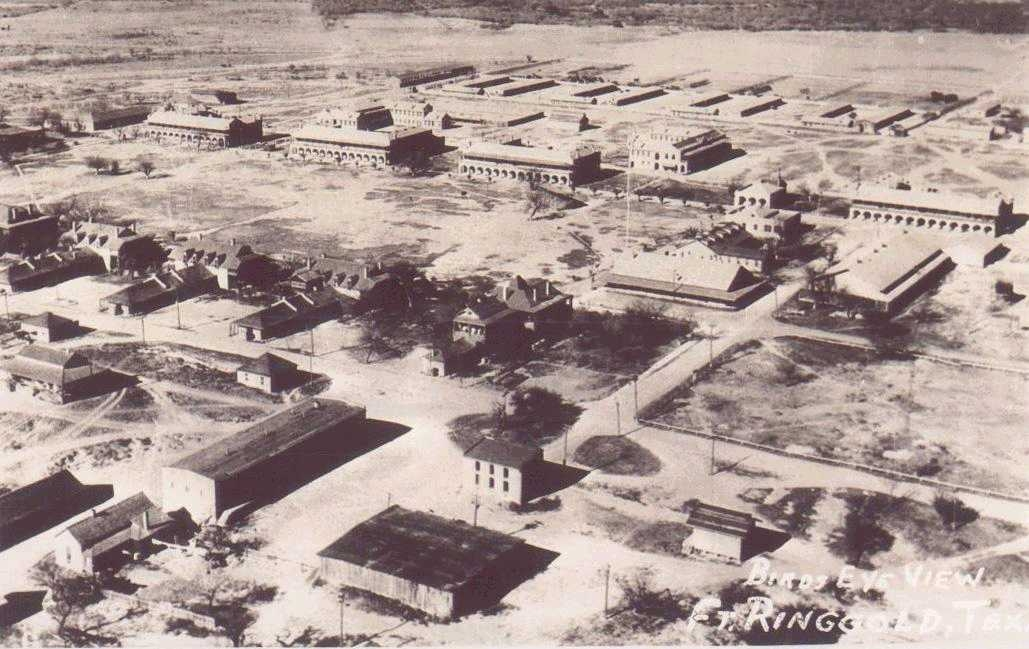
Fort Ringgold layout.

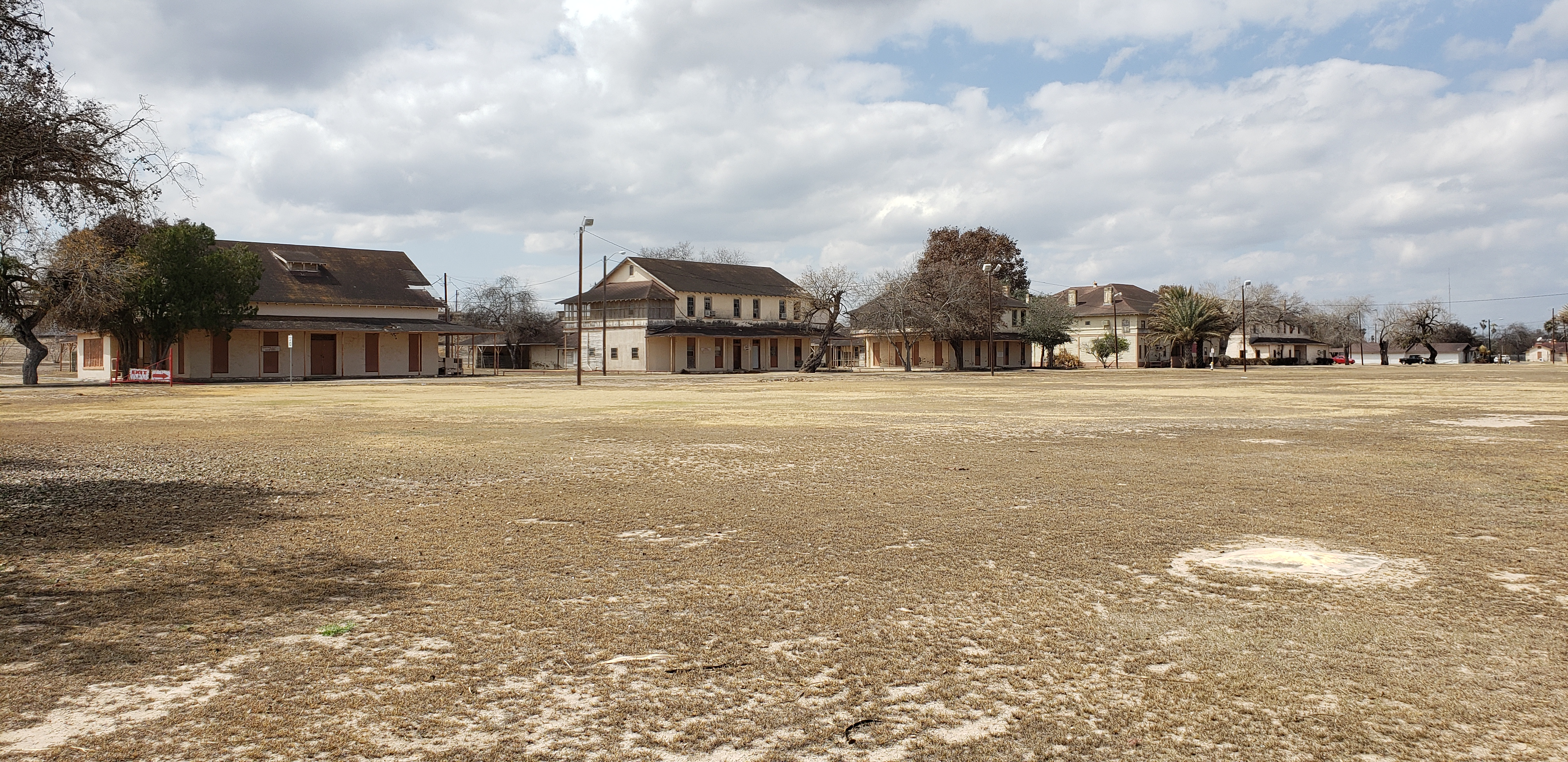
Fort Ringgold parade ground

The area around Rio Grande City was first settled by Spanish colonists on the southern bank of the river as Camargo. The northern bank became more densely settled after the Mexican-American War and United States' annexation of the territory.

In 1846 the northern bank was gradually developed— still under the name Camargo. It was used by the US Army as a supply depot for its invading Mexico as part of the Mexican–American War. The area was strategic as the furthest point up the Rio Grande that was navigable and regularly accessible to the era's steamboats.

During the early stages of the war, US soldier Henry Clay Davis married Hilaria de la Garza Falcon, a resident of Camargo south of the river. She was heiress to the land on the north side of the river that was developed as Rio Grande City. At the end of the war, Davis set out to organize this area into a formal city; he divided the land into plots to be sold.

At first, the area was referred to as Rancho Davis. He and other developers changed the name to Rio Grande City to attract Anglo-American investors and settlers. From its founding in 1848 until the Texas Mexican Railroad opened up in 1883, Rio Grande City was one of the most significant hubs of trade between Texas and Mexico. In addition, because of its prominence and exploits by local residents, it was part of the romanticized concept in the United States of the "Wild West".

Famous early residents include Joshua H. Bean, brother of Judge Roy Bean, and the first mayor of San Diego, California; Orlando C. Phelps, one of the few surviving members of the Mier Expedition; Edwin R. Rainwater, hero of the Texas Revolution; Edward R. Hord, an influential early South Texas statesman; and John L. Haynes, a native Virginian politician and writer who was a strong proponent of Mexican-American (Tejano) rights and outspoken anti-secessionist before the Civil War.

Rio Grande City has conserved some of its older structures, and has a designated historic district.

Among its contributing structures is the La Borde House, which dates to 1899. La Borde was a French riverboat trader and merchant who commissioned the mansion's design in Paris. He had this refined by architects in San Antonio, Texas, and oversaw construction of the building along Main Street.

The large house was renovated around the early 1980s, nearly 100 years later. It is now operated as a hotel, complete with a parlor, patio, parlor, shaded verandas, and restaurant.

In the 1970s and into the 1980s, federal law enforcement officials concentrated their anti-drug smuggling efforts on Starr County.

In spite of Rio Grande City's rich architectural heritage, many buildings in the old downtown district are abandoned, dilapidated, or crumbling. While there are a good number of small shops and businesses operating in the district, most new development and commerce takes place in new shopping centers outside of the old downtown neighborhood.

In May 1993, Rio Grande City was officially incorporated as a municipal corporation (i.e. city).

=== Fort Ringgold ===
Ringgold Barracks were established at Davis Landing on 26 October 1848 by the 1st US Infantry under the command of Captain J.H. La Motte, in honor of Major Ringgold, who was mortally wounded at the Battle of Palo Alto. Troops were withdrawn on 3 March 1859 but reoccupied again on 29 December 1859 during the Cortina War.

The fort was abandoned again at the start of the Civil War in 1861, but reoccupied by US forces in 1865. The fort was active until 1944 when the property was sold to the Rio Grande City public schools system. Units stationed here included the 1st Infantry (Mounted Dragoons), 7th and 28th Infantry Regiments, 3rd Texas Volunteers, the 9th, 10th and 12th Cavalry Regiments, the 9th and 10th being composed of Buffalo Soldiers.

The original parade ground is maintained, and several post buildings survive to be used as school facilities. These include the sentry and guard houses, barracks, officers quarters, bakery, hospital and post headquarters, situated along Ringgold Avenue, Lee Circle, 12th Cavalry and F Troop streets. The Rio Grande City United States Army Reserve Center is the only remaining military presence at the Fort Ringgold area.

== Geography ==
Rio Grande City is located at 26°22′50″N 98°49′6″W (26.380667, −98.818364).

The city gained area prior to the 2010 census giving it a total area of 11.4 square miles (30.0 km^{2}), all land.

=== Climate ===
Rio Grande City has a hot semi-arid climate (Köppen BSh), typical of its region. It features sweltering summers with occasional heavy rainfall from remnant hurricanes, and winters that average warm to very warm and dry. Occasionally during some winters, though, fronts moving southwards produce heavy rainfall. For instance, 6.39 inches or 162.3 millimeters fell in February 1923, and 5.29 inches or 134.4 millimeters in February 1983, but only 0.13 inches or 3.3 millimeters between November 1970 and March 1971, and no rain whatsoever occurred between Christmas Day, 1998 and March 27, 1999. Rainfall normally has two maxima, the first in May–June and the heavier second in September–October, between which westward movement of the subtropical anticyclone and divergence between westerly and trade wind flows weakens convection.

The wettest year on record has been 1967 with 48.35 inches or 1,228.1 millimeters, and the lowest annual rainfalls 5.28 inches or 134.1 millimeters in 1902, 8.55 inches or 217.2 millimeters in 1952 and 9.10 inches or 231.1 millimeters in 1996. The wettest month was September 1967 with 26.06 inches or 661.9 millimeters, of which 23.89 inches or 606.8 millimeters fell between the 20th and 23rd due to Hurricane Beulah. Measurable snowfall has occurred only three times: 3.0 inches (0.076 m) on February 7, 1906, 2.5 inches (0.063 m) on January 10, 1967, and 3.0 inches (0.076 m) on Christmas Day, 2004.

Rio Grande City can sometimes be the hottest place in the United States: it holds the nationwide all-time record maxima for February and March and stands only 1 °F or 0.6 °C below the nationwide January record of nearby Zapata. Temperatures above 86 °F or 30 °C can be expected every month even in winter. Occasionally, however, during outbreaks of cold continental air from Canada, temperatures can reach freezing, with the record low being 10 °F or −12.2 °C on January 12, 1962, and the record low maximum 27 °F or −2.8 °C during a famous eastern cold wave on December 23, 1989. The coolest complete month has been January 1940 which averaged 50.0 °F or 10.0 °C, (Note: Incomplete data for December 1989 average as low as 49.0 °F or 9.4 °C.) although the coolest mean maximum was January 1977's 60.4 °F or 15.8 °C.

Climate data for Rio Grande City, Texas (1991–2020 normals, (Note: Mean monthly maxima and minima (i.e. the expected highest and lowest temperature readings at any point during the year or given month) calculated based on data at said location from 1991 to 2020.) extremes 1897–1906, 1928–present)
| Month | Jan | Feb | Mar | Apr | May | Jun | Jul | Aug | Sep | Oct | Nov | Dec | Year |
|---|---|---|---|---|---|---|---|---|---|---|---|---|---|
| Record high °F (°C) | 97 (36) | 104 (40) | 108 (42) | 112 (44) | 112 (44) | 116 (47) | 111 (44) | 110 (43) | 111 (44) | 104 (40) | 99 (37) | 97 (36) | 116 (47) |
| Mean maximum °F (°C) | 88 (31) | 93 (34) | 97 (36) | 102 (39) | 102 (39) | 105 (41) | 105 (41) | 105 (41) | 102 (39) | 97 (36) | 93 (34) | 88 (31) | 107 (42) |
| Mean daily maximum °F (°C) | 70.7 (21.5) | 76.3 (24.6) | 82.0 (27.8) | 88.6 (31.4) | 93.8 (34.3) | 98.1 (36.7) | 99.0 (37.2) | 99.4 (37.4) | 93.9 (34.4) | 88.4 (31.3) | 78.7 (25.9) | 71.9 (22.2) | 86.7 (30.4) |
| Daily mean °F (°C) | 57.9 (14.4) | 63.1 (17.3) | 69.1 (20.6) | 75.7 (24.3) | 81.9 (27.7) | 86.2 (30.1) | 87.1 (30.6) | 87.3 (30.7) | 82.5 (28.1) | 75.9 (24.4) | 66.5 (19.2) | 59.2 (15.1) | 74.4 (23.6) |
| Mean daily minimum °F (°C) | 45.2 (7.3) | 49.8 (9.9) | 56.3 (13.5) | 62.7 (17.1) | 69.9 (21.1) | 74.4 (23.6) | 75.1 (23.9) | 75.1 (23.9) | 71.0 (21.7) | 63.4 (17.4) | 54.3 (12.4) | 46.6 (8.1) | 62.0 (16.7) |
| Mean minimum °F (°C) | 31 (−1) | 35 (2) | 39 (4) | 49 (9) | 59 (15) | 69 (21) | 72 (22) | 71 (22) | 62 (17) | 46 (8) | 38 (3) | 31 (−1) | 28 (−2) |
| Record low °F (°C) | 10 (−12) | 15 (−9) | 25 (−4) | 25 (−4) | 46 (8) | 53 (12) | 62 (17) | 60 (16) | 45 (7) | 29 (−2) | 22 (−6) | 15 (−9) | 10 (−12) |
| Average rainfall inches (mm) | 0.78 (20) | 0.95 (24) | 1.25 (32) | 1.02 (26) | 2.85 (72) | 2.76 (70) | 2.04 (52) | 1.34 (34) | 5.12 (130) | 2.46 (62) | 1.10 (28) | 0.80 (20) | 22.47 (571) |
| Average rainy days (≥ 0.01 in) | 5.8 | 4.5 | 4.7 | 4.1 | 4.5 | 4.0 | 3.8 | 3.9 | 7.6 | 4.8 | 4.9 | 6.0 | 58.6 |
Source: NOAA

== Education ==
Rio Grande City is served by the Rio Grande City Grulla Independent School District (formerly Rio Grande City Consolidated Independent School District).

Immaculate Conception School of the Roman Catholic Diocese of Brownsville, founded in 1884 and the only Catholic school in Starr County, provides a faith-based Pre-K through eighth-grade education to approximately 250 students each year.

== Notable people ==
- Shannon Dingle, Christian writer and activist; taught special education writing at Ringgold Middle School for a while
- Ricardo Sanchez, Lieutenant General and commander of U.S. forces in Iraq; retired from the United States Army

== Demographics ==
Historical population
| Census | Pop. | Note | %± |
|---|---|---|---|
| 1950 | 3,992 | | — |
| 1960 | 5,835 | | 46.2% |
| 1970 | 5,676 | | −2.7% |
| 1980 | 8,930 | | 57.3% |
| 1990 | 9,891 | | 10.8% |
| 2000 | 11,923 | | 20.5% |
| 2010 | 13,834 | | 16.0% |
| 2020 | 15,317 | | 10.7% |
U.S. Decennial Census; 1850–1900 1910; 1920 1930 1940; 1950 1960 1970; 1980 1990 2000; 2010 2020

Rio Grande City first appeared as an unincorporated community in the 1950 U.S. census; and as a census designated place in the 1980 United States census. After incorporation, Rio Grande City was listed as a city the 2000 U.S. census.

=== Racial and ethnic composition ===
Rio Grande City city, Texas – Racial and ethnic composition Note: the US Census treats Hispanic/Latino as an ethnic category. This table excludes Latinos from the racial categories and assigns them to a separate category. Hispanics/Latinos may be of any race.
| Race / Ethnicity (NH = Non-Hispanic) | Pop 2000 | Pop 2010 | Pop 2020 | % 2000 | % 2010 | % 2020 |
|---|---|---|---|---|---|---|
| White alone (NH) | 317 | 653 | 413 | 2.66% | 4.72% | 2.70% |
| Black or African American alone (NH) | 4 | 5 | 8 | 0.03% | 0.04% | 0.05% |
| Native American or Alaska Native alone (NH) | 12 | 7 | 2 | 0.10% | 0.05% | 0.01% |
| Asian alone (NH) | 130 | 105 | 81 | 1.09% | 0.76% | 0.53% |
| Native Hawaiian or Pacific Islander alone (NH) | 0 | 0 | 0 | 0.00% | 0.00% | 0.00% |
| Other race alone (NH) | 5 | 5 | 24 | 0.04% | 0.04% | 0.16% |
| Mixed race or Multiracial (NH) | 22 | 15 | 31 | 0.18% | 0.11% | 0.20% |
| Hispanic or Latino (any race) | 11,433 | 13,044 | 14,758 | 95.89% | 94.29% | 96.35% |
| Total | 11,923 | 13,834 | 15,317 | 100.00% | 100.00% | 100.00% |

=== 2020 census ===
As of the 2020 census, there were 15,317 people, 4,689 households, and 2,880 families residing in the city. The median age was 32.0 years, 30.7% of residents were under the age of 18, and 12.9% of residents were 65 years of age or older. For every 100 females there were 93.7 males, and for every 100 females age 18 and over there were 88.5 males age 18 and over.

Of those households, 48.3% had children under the age of 18 living in them. Of all households, 49.9% were married-couple households, 14.7% were households with a male householder and no spouse or partner present, and 31.0% were households with a female householder and no spouse or partner present. About 18.7% of all households were made up of individuals and 9.0% had someone living alone who was 65 years of age or older.

There were 5,410 housing units, of which 13.3% were vacant. The homeowner vacancy rate was 1.7% and the rental vacancy rate was 11.7%.

95.8% of residents lived in urban areas, while 4.2% lived in rural areas.

Racial composition as of the 2020 census
| Race | Number | Percent |
|---|---|---|
| White | 5,865 | 38.3% |
| Black or African American | 15 | 0.1% |
| American Indian and Alaska Native | 65 | 0.4% |
| Asian | 88 | 0.6% |
| Native Hawaiian and Other Pacific Islander | 1 | 0.0% |
| Some other race | 3,238 | 21.1% |
| Two or more races | 6,045 | 39.5% |
| Hispanic or Latino (of any race) | 14,758 | 96.4% |

=== 2010 census ===
As of the 2010 Census Rio Grande City had a population of 13,834. The median age was 30. The racial makeup of the population was 92.1% white (4.7% claiming to not be Hispanic or Latino), 0.2% Black, 0.3% Native American, 0.8% Asian, 5.5% from some other race and 1.1% from two or more races. 94.3% of the population was Hispanic or Latino of any race with 88.2% of the population describing themselves as ethnically Mexican.

=== 2000 census ===
As of the census of 2000, there were 11,923 people, 3,333 households, and 2,796 families residing in the city. The population density was 1,571.6 inhabitants per square mile (606.8/km^{2}). There were 3,846 housing units at an average density of 506.9 per square mile (195.7/km^{2}). The racial makeup of the city was 82.97% White, 0.30% African American, 0.44% Native American, 1.11% Asian, 0.01% Pacific Islander, 12.51% from other races, and 2.67% from two or more races. Hispanic or Latino of any race were 95.89% of the population.

There were 3,333 households, out of which 47.0% had children under the age of 18 living with them, 60.1% were married couples living together, 19.8% had a female householder with no husband present, and 16.1% were non-families. 14.6% of all households were made up of individuals, and 7.5% had someone living alone who was 65 years of age or older. The average household size was 3.47 and the average family size was 3.86.

In the city, the population was spread out, with 33.1% under the age of 18, 11.4% from 18 to 24, 27.4% from 25 to 44, 17.0% from 45 to 64, and 11.2% who were 65 years of age or older. The median age was 29 years. For every 100 females, there were 93.4 males. For every 100 females age 18 and over, there were 88.5 males.

The median income for a household in the city was $19,853, and the median income for a family was $21,363. Males had a median income of $20,245 versus $14,984 for females. The per capita income for the city was $9,684. About 40.4% of families and 44.1% of the population were below the poverty line, including 57.3% of those under age 18 and 33.7% of those age 65 or over.
