= Bob Honey Who Just Do Stuff =

2018 book by Sean Penn

- Author: Sean Penn
- Language: English
- Genre: Novel; Political satire
- Published: 2018 (Atria Books)
- Publication place: United States
- Pages: 176
- ISBN: 978-1-5011-8906-7

Bob Honey Who Just Do Stuff is a 2018 American satirical novel written by Sean Penn. Narrated from the point of view of Pappy Pariah, the book tells the story of Bob Honey, a supposed international assassin who kills elderly people with a mallet. Atria Books, an imprint of Simon & Schuster, published the novel on March 27, 2018.

== Inspiration ==
In several interviews, Penn said that he was inspired to write the novel in response to current political movements, including the Parkland shooting survivors working to change gun laws. Although readers can draw connections to modern events and figures, Penn claims that the book is about morality and modern American culture.

== Plot ==
With no formal plot, it is not entirely clear if Honey's life story, recounted through Pariah, is supposed to be true or a figment of Honey's delusional mind. Honey lives in a quiet street in Woodview, California. Since his divorce, he has a hard time connecting with other people and annoys his neighbors with his lawn mowing. Honey complains of the incessant marketing of modern society and never-ending news cycles. His ex-wife, who drives an ice-cream truck around his neighborhood, is now happily married to her divorce lawyer. Honey now longs for a young woman named Annie; when describing her, he says, "Effervescence lived in her every cellular expression, and she had spizzerinctum to spare."

Honey is a former septic tank salesman who becomes an assassin. He tries to be more social, throwing a barbecue for his neighbors. His job as a contract killer for a secretive government program takes him around the world. The off-the-books government program instructs him to target elderly citizens and others who drain resources in a consumption-driven society. His adventures include a trip to New Orleans to help Katrina victims. He travels to Baghdad, Beirut, South Sudan, and other locations for sewage emergencies. Honey also submerges himself into the Pacific Ocean in a quest to find sea life. An investigative journalist starts asking questions about him, causing Honey to start making changes in his life. He is threatened by an ever-invasive media and possible assassination attempts from his mysterious controllers.

The book includes an epilogue featuring a poem that touches on current events — the 2017 Las Vegas shooting, North Korea, Puerto Rico in the aftermath of Hurricane Maria, and the MeToo movement. Honey also writes a threatening letter to the US President "Mr. Landlord" in which he advocates for the President's assassination. He declares, "You are not simply a president in need of impeachment, you are a man in need of an intervention. We are not simply a people in need of an intervention, we are a nation in need of an assassin [...] Tweet me bitch, I dare you." The lengthy epilogue poem ends with Honey killing the investigative journalist with his mallet and running away to parts unknown.

== Characters ==
- Pappy Pariah – Born in the fictional town of Summerton Feathers, Iowa in 1960, Pappy Pariah is the author of the audiobook version of Bob Honey Who Just Do Stuff. Pappy is both the narrator of the book and the pseudonym for Sean Penn who claimed to have met Pappy in Florida. Pappy claims to have written articles for mainstream American news outlets under a pseudonym himself, but this is his first novel. When he was 13, he suffered from severe appendicitis and says this medical event inspired him to become a writer.
- Bob Honey – The titular character. He is described as an angry, divorced middle-aged man with a variety of jobs: sewage specialist, carnival carny, Jehovah's witness, government operative, and assassin. Bob is alienated by a media-saturated society and has a hard time getting along with other people, especially since his divorce. The 56-year-old character has "an ultra-violent skepticism toward the messaging and mediocrity of modern times".
- The Landlord – Bob Honey writes a scathing letter to the landlord, described as "the violently immature seventy-year-old boy-man with money and French vanilla cotton candy hair". When asked about the "Trumpian" Landlord character, Penn has maintained that it is up to the reader to interpret the metaphors he develops in the book.

== Release ==
A portion of the novel was first published as a free Audible book, listing Pappy Pariah as the author and Penn as just the narrator of the audio book. Initially, Penn denied being the author of the book, insisting instead that it was written by an author he had met in a bar in Key West, Florida.

In press junkets to promote the novel's release, Penn has stated his wish to quit acting and become a full-time novelist.

== Reception ==
Bob Honey was met with generally negative reviews, with several critics decrying the writer's undisciplined style. Mark Athitakis writing for The Washington Post was critical of the book, observing that the satire was not humorous and the writing incoherent with overuse of alliteration. Writing for the National Review, Jonah Goldberg had not yet read the book but commented on excerpts, characterizing the formulaic prose as "4 parts alliteration, 1 part wry masturbation references." Goldberg's comments were based on a review and quotes provided by Claire Fallon of the Huffington Post, who herself was highly critical of the book, going so far as to announce that "Sean Penn The Novelist Must Be Stopped". It was featured in Michael J. Nelson and Conor Lastowka's podcast series 372 Pages We'll Never Get Back, a program which analyzes literature they deem to be of poor quality. On Cracked.com, Mark Hill called it "the worst novel in human history," observing that "Penn writes like he's looked up every single word in his thesaurus except 'dictionary'." The novel was also criticized for racist and misogynistic content. In The Guardian, Sian Cain called Bob Honey "repellent and stupid on so many levels."

Penn has defended portions of the book concerning the presidency of Donald Trump and the Me Too movement as being "taken out of context", remarking, "I think, we're in a sad state where fiction is attributed to opinion ... where fiction can't be just read as it is." Several media sources have interpreted "Mr. Landlord" as an obvious allegorical reference to Donald Trump. According to the BBC News, "Critics were keen to pick up on Mr Landlord, a character that could be a thinly veiled dig at Donald Trump. He is described as a 'violently immature 70-year-old boy-man with money and French vanilla cotton candy hair'."

Novelist Salman Rushdie praised the novel, saying "It seems wrong to say that so dystopian a novel is great fun to read [...] I suspect that Thomas Pynchon and Hunter S. Thompson would love this book." Travel writer and novelist Paul Theroux also came out in favor of the book, calling it "Comic, cauchemaresque, crackling with life [...] Bob Honey is a hero of our Trumpian times reflected in the cracked mirror of Penn's prose. I loved that it defied the critics who are, as always like eunuchs in a harem observing the creative act but unable to do the same."

Trevor Noah, on Comedy Central's The Daily Show, described the book as "a strange story that seems like a metaphor for real life." Penn told Marc Maron in his podcast, WTF, that the novel Bob Honey was a way for him to combat the negativity and societal burnout he had been dealing with. "It was an exercise in avoiding defeat," he told Maron. "It's kind of 'operating world humor,' because I felt like a surgeon whose patient was inevitably going to die every day. And I thought, let me go practice this in an alternate reality form which got me away from the news for a while."

The Pearl Jam song "Never Destination," written by longtime Penn friend Eddie Vedder, on the 2020 album Gigaton mentions Bob Honey in the lyrics: "Thank you Bob Honey. Thanks Paul Theroux. If ever I die, to this place let me go."

== Sequel ==
A sequel was released on September 10, 2019, with the title Bob Honey Sings Jimmy Crack Corn, published by Rare Bird Books, as it directly continues off the events of the first novel, seeing Bob Honey, hunted by the authorities, head to Washington, D.C. to directly confront the Landlord.

== See also ==
- The Assassination of Richard Nixon – a 2004 film featuring Penn as Samuel Byck, who died during a failed attempt to assassinate Richard Nixon
