= The Assassination of Richard Nixon =

2004 film

- Theatrical release poster
- Directed by: Niels Mueller
- Written by: Niels Mueller; Kevin Kennedy
- Produced by: Alfonso Cuarón; Jorge Vergara
- Starring: Sean Penn; Don Cheadle; Jack Thompson; Naomi Watts; Brad William Henke; Michael Wincott; Mykelti Williamson
- Cinematography: Emmanuel Lubezki
- Edited by: Jay Cassidy
- Music by: Steven M. Stern
- Production companies: Anhelo Productions; Appian Way; Esperanto Filmoj
- Distributed by: ThinkFilm
- Release dates: May 17, 2004 (Cannes); December 29, 2004 (United States)
- Running time: 95 minutes
- Countries: United States; Mexico
- Language: English
- Budget: $4.6 million
- Box office: $4.4 million

The Assassination of Richard Nixon is a 2004 drama film directed by Niels Mueller and starring Sean Penn, Don Cheadle, Jack Thompson and Naomi Watts. It is based on the story of would-be assassin Samuel Byck, who plotted to kill Richard Nixon in 1974. It was screened in the Un Certain Regard section at the 2004 Cannes Film Festival. The last name of the main character was changed to Bicke.

== Plot ==
In 1973, 43-year-old Philadelphia resident Sam Bicke (Sean Penn) is a down-on-his-luck salesman who desperately wishes to reconcile with his estranged wife Marie (Naomi Watts). A constant moralizer, he states that he stopped working at the tire shop owned by his brother Julius (Michael Wincott) because he was required to lie to the customers. Believing society's discrimination affects poor white people just as much as blacks, he attempts to join the Black Panthers. His dream is to own his own mobile tire sales business in partnership with his best friend, African-American mechanic Bonny (Don Cheadle).

He finds employment at an office furniture retailer, where he is patronized by his boss Jack (Jack Thompson), and his awkwardness makes him a poor salesman. Jack describes US president Richard Nixon as the greatest salesman in history, because his election promise in 1968 was to exit the Vietnam War, and four years later he again coasted to an easy re-election in 1972 on the promise of ending the same war.

Bicke becomes increasingly disillusioned with his status in society. He applies for a government loan to set up the business with Bonny, and he frantically waits for an answer in the mail. His sales figures continue to deteriorate, and Jack, who hires only married salesmen, suspects Sam of lying about his marriage. Marie rebuts Sam's awkward attempts at reconciliation and sends him a divorce decree, leaving him weeping in despair. He sabotages a sale by turning up the television volume in the showroom as Jack negotiates, then quits his job. Watching Nixon give a speech during the Watergate scandal, he screams at the television "It's about money, Dick!" With the loan still not finalized, he breaks into his brother's tire sales business to make a large order that will be delivered to Bonny. The loan application is ultimately denied, his rent is past due, and his brother Julius reveals he had to bail out Bonny, who was arrested for receiving stolen goods, and is now done entirely with his deadbeat, hypocritical brother.

Sam, broken, obsesses about Nixon. Seeing a news story about a helicopter pilot arrested for flying around the White House, he formulates a plan to hijack a passenger airliner and crash it into the White House. He records a message detailing his intentions and state of mind, addressing it to Leonard Bernstein, whom he greatly admires.

Sam liquidates his bank account, steals Bonny's gun, and confronts Jack at a restaurant. Unable to pull the trigger, he flees to the house he once shared with Marie, sleeping in the now-empty home, then killing the family dog. He drives to Baltimore–Washington International Airport with a concealed gun and suitcase full of gasoline, mails his confession to Bernstein, and approaches the plane. When he discovers the security procedures are more thorough than expected, he panics and rushes on board, shooting a policeman.

Once on board, he shoots the pilots and coerces a passenger to act as co-pilot. He's shot through a window by an intervening policeman, and commits suicide before he can be arrested. When the day's events are shown on TV, neither Bonny nor Marie reacts to the mention of Sam's name.

== Cast ==
- Sean Penn as Samuel "Sam" Bicke, a salesman with a history of short-lived jobs
- Naomi Watts as Marie Andersen Bicke, Sam's ex-wife
- Don Cheadle as Bonny Simmons, Sam's best friend and potential business partner
- Jack Thompson as Jack Jones, Sam's new employer at a furniture retailer
- Mykelti Williamson as Harold Mann, head of the local Black Panther chapter
- Michael Wincott as Julius Bicke, Sam's brother
- Nick Searcy as Tom Ford, director of the local loan agency
- Brad William Henke as Martin Jones, Jack's son and a salesman
- Joe Marinelli as Mel Samuels

== Reception ==
On the review aggregator website Rotten Tomatoes, 67% of 129 critics' reviews are positive, with an average rating of 6.6/10. The website's consensus reads: "The Assassination of Richard Nixon struggles to convey deeper meaning, but a fascinating true story and compelling Sean Penn performance are worthy compensations." Metacritic, which uses a weighted average, assigned the film a score of 63 out of 100, based on 38 critics, indicating "generally favorable" reviews.

Empire gave the film four stars out of five, stating, "it's great to see the courage of '70s Hollywood meeting the conviction of 21st-century indie cinema in this stark, bold drama."

Roger Ebert gave it 3.5 out of 4 stars and wrote, "Does the film have a message? I don't think it wants one. It is about the journey of a man going mad. A film can simply be a character study, as this one is. That is sufficient. A message might seem trundled in and gratuitous."

Stephen Hunter of The Washington Post wrote: "It grinds on without mercy. You're in the cross hairs. There is no escape. Where is that Secret Service when you need it?"

== In popular culture ==
In 2018, in a discussion of Stephen Sondheim’s Assassins, Donald Clarke wrote in The Irish Times that "[t]he most interesting cinematic analysis of any character featured in Assassins may, however, be Niels Mueller’s fascinating, underappreciated The Assassination of Richard Nixon from 2004."

== See also ==
- List of American films of 2004
- List of films based on actual events
- Bob Honey Who Just Do Stuff, a 2018 novel by Penn similar in content
