= KFME =

KFME may refer to:

- KFME (TV), a television station licensed to Fargo, North Dakota, US
- Tipton Airport, in Maryland, US, ICAO code KFME
