= William Tipton =

William Tipton may refer to:

- William H. Tipton, American photographer
- William Dolley Tipton, American World War I flying ace

== See also ==
- Billy Tipton, American jazz musician, bandleader, and talent broker
