= Samuel Byck =

American hijacker and would-be assassin of Richard Nixon (1930–1974)

- Born: Samuel Joseph Byck; January 30, 1930; Philadelphia, Pennsylvania, U.S.
- Died: February 22, 1974 (aged 44); Anne Arundel County, Maryland, U.S.
- Cause of death: Suicide by gunshot
- Known for: Attempting to assassinate President Richard Nixon

Details
- Date: February 22, 1974
- Killed: 2
- Injured: 1
- Weapons: Smith & Wesson Model 17, homemade bomb

Samuel Joseph Byck (January 30, 1930 – February 22, 1974) was an American hijacker and attempted assassin. On February 22, 1974, he attempted to hijack a plane flying out of Baltimore/Washington International Airport, intending to crash into the White House in the hopes of killing U.S. President Richard Nixon. Byck killed an airport policeman and the plane's copilot and wounded the pilot, but Byck was shot and wounded by another policeman before committing suicide.

== Early life ==
Born to poor Jewish parents in South Philadelphia, Byck dropped out of high school in the ninth grade in order to support his impoverished family. He enlisted in the U.S. Army in 1954 and was honorably discharged in 1956. He married shortly thereafter, and fathered four children.

== Background ==
In 1972, Byck began to suffer from severe bouts of depression after his wife divorced him and he had several job-related financial failures. He admitted himself to a psychiatric ward, for a two-month stay. Byck began to harbor the belief that the Nixon administration was conspiring to oppress the poor.

Byck came to the notice of the Secret Service in 1972, when he threatened Nixon, whom he had resented since the Small Business Administration had turned down his loan application. Byck had also sent tape recordings to various Jewish public figures (including scientist Jonas Salk, Senator Abraham Ribicoff of Connecticut, and composer Leonard Bernstein) and had tried to join the Black Panthers. The Secret Service considered Byck to be harmless, and no action was taken at that time.

== Assassination attempt ==
Delta Air Lines Flight 523
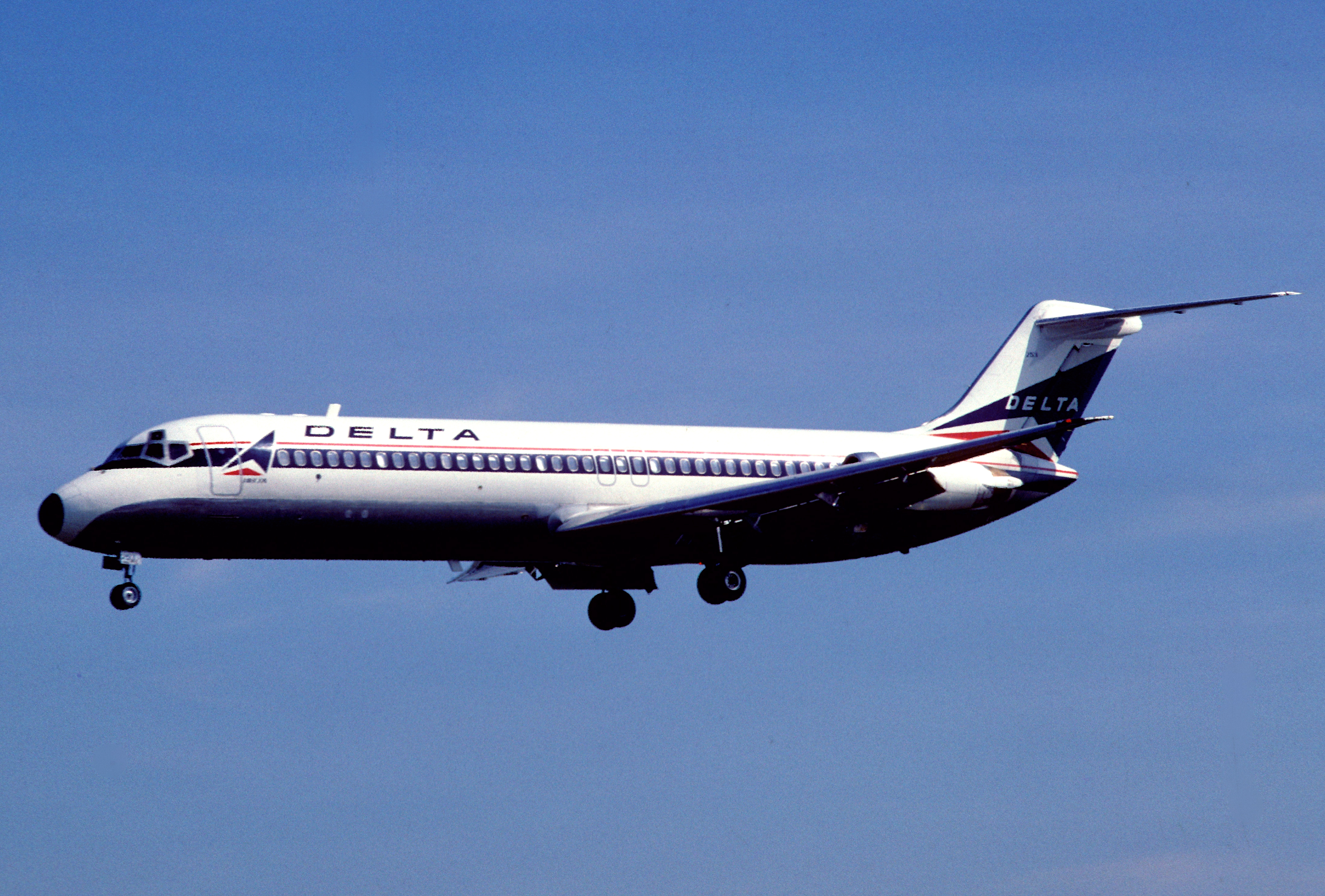
- A Delta Air Lines McDonnell Douglas DC-9-30, similar to the one involved.

Accident
- Date: February 22, 1974
- Summary: Attempted hijacking
- Site: Baltimore–Washington International Airport, Maryland, U.S.

Aircraft
- Aircraft type: McDonnell Douglas DC-9-31
- Operator: Delta Air Lines
- IATA flight No.: DL523
- ICAO flight No.: DAL523
- Call sign: DELTA 523
- Flight origin: Baltimore–Washington International Airport
- Destination: Hartsfield-Jackson International Airport, Atlanta, U.S.
- Occupants: 14
- Passengers: 12
- Crew: 2
- Fatalities: 2 (including Byck)
- Injuries: 1
- Survivors: 12

Ground casualties
- Ground fatalities: 1

In early 1974, Byck decided to assassinate Nixon and started to stalk him and follow his movements via news outlets. He planned to assassinate Nixon by hijacking an airliner and crashing it into the White House on a day when Nixon would be there. It has been suggested (for instance, by the 2004 film dramatization of his life) that Byck was inspired by news reports of the landing at the White House by U.S. Army soldier Robert K. Preston in a stolen UH-1B Huey helicopter on February 17.

Because he was already known to the Secret Service and his legal attempts to purchase a firearm might have resulted in increased scrutiny, Byck stole a Smith & Wesson Model 17 .22-caliber revolver from his friend to use in the hijacking. Byck also made a bomb out of two gallon containers of gasoline and an igniter. All through this process, Byck made audio recordings explaining his motives and his plans; he expected to be considered a hero for his actions and wanted to fully document his reasons for the assassination.

On Friday morning, February 22, 1974, Byck drove to the Baltimore/Washington International Airport. Shortly after 7:00 a.m. EST, he shot and killed Maryland Aviation Administration policeman George Neal Ramsburg before storming a DC-9, Delta Air Lines Flight 523 to Atlanta, which he chose because it was the closest flight that was ready to take off. Pilots Reese Loftin and Fred Jones immediately complied with Byck's orders and calmly tried to reassure him that they would cooperate. Loftin told Byck they could not take off with the doors to the aircraft open, and then alerted the control tower and summoned police assistance while Byck left to close them. After the pilots told him they still could not take off until wheel blocks were removed, he shot them both and grabbed a nearby passenger, ordering her to "fly the plane". Jones died as he was being removed from the aircraft after the event was concluded; Loftin survived the attack. Byck told a flight attendant to close the door, or he would blow up the plane. An Anne Arundel County Police Department officer attempted to shoot the tires of the aircraft to prevent its takeoff, but the bullets fired from their police-issued revolvers failed to penetrate the aircraft's tires and ricocheted, some hitting the wing of the plane.

After a standoff between Byck and police on the jetway, Anne Arundel County police officer Charles Troyer fired four shots through the aircraft door at Byck with a .357 Magnum revolver taken from the dead Ramsburg. Two of the shots penetrated the thick window of the aircraft door and wounded Byck. However, before the police could gain entry to the plane, Byck shot himself fatally in the head.

Byck lived for a few minutes after shooting himself, dying after saying "help me" to one of the policemen who entered the plane. A briefcase containing the gasoline bomb was found under his body. The plane never left the gate, and Nixon's schedule was not affected by the assassination attempt, although he was in the White House at the time.

It was subsequently discovered that Byck had sent a tape recording detailing his plan, which he called "Operation Pandora's Box", to news columnist Jack Anderson. A review of records disclosed that Byck had been arrested twice for protesting in front of the White House without a permit and that he later dressed in a Santa Claus suit for another protest. Loftin, the flight's captain, recovered and resumed flying airliners several years later.

In 1987, the Federal Aviation Administration produced a document entitled Troubled Passage: The Federal Aviation Administration During the Nixon–Ford Term 1973–1977, which mentioned Byck's failed hijacking: "Though Byck lacked the skill and self-control to reach his target, he had provided a chilling reminder of the potential of violence against civil aviation. Under a more relaxed security system, his suicidal rampage might have begun when the airliner was aloft."

== Legacy ==
Byck was buried at the Mount Jacob Cemetery in Glenolden, Pennsylvania.

After Byck's failed assassination attempt and subsequent death, he faded into relative obscurity, except among members of security organizations. One of the long-term consequences of Byck's failed hijacking was that it, along with several other failed and successful hijackings, helped spur the implementation of new security measures for airlines and airports.

The 9/11 Commission Report mentioned Byck's attempted assassination of Nixon on page 561 in note 21:

As part of his 34-page analysis, the attorney explained why he thought that a fueled Boeing 747, used as a weapon, "must be considered capable of destroying virtually any building located anywhere in the world." DOJ memo, Robert D. to Cathleen C., "Aerial Intercepts and Shoot-downs: Ambiguities of Law and Practical Considerations", Mar. 30, 2000, p. 10. "Also, in February 1974, a man named Samuel Byck attempted to commandeer a plane at Baltimore Washington International Airport with the intention of forcing the pilots to fly into Washington and crash into the White House to kill the President. The man was shot by police and then killed himself on the aircraft while it was still on the ground at the airport."

== In popular culture ==
Byck is one of the (failed) assassins portrayed in Stephen Sondheim's and John Weidman's 1991 musical Assassins. His role in the musical is built largely around his tapes sent to Leonard Bernstein and other public figures, which he is depicted recording during two scene-length monologues, the first addressed to Bernstein and the second to Nixon himself. Byck also wears a Santa Claus suit throughout the play in reference to an incident where he did so while protesting Nixon on Christmas Eve in 1973.

A film based on his story, The Assassination of Richard Nixon, was released in 2004. The film starred Sean Penn as Bicke (the surname spelling having been changed).
