= Hawker Hunter Tower Bridge incident =

Unauthorised London jet excursion of 1968

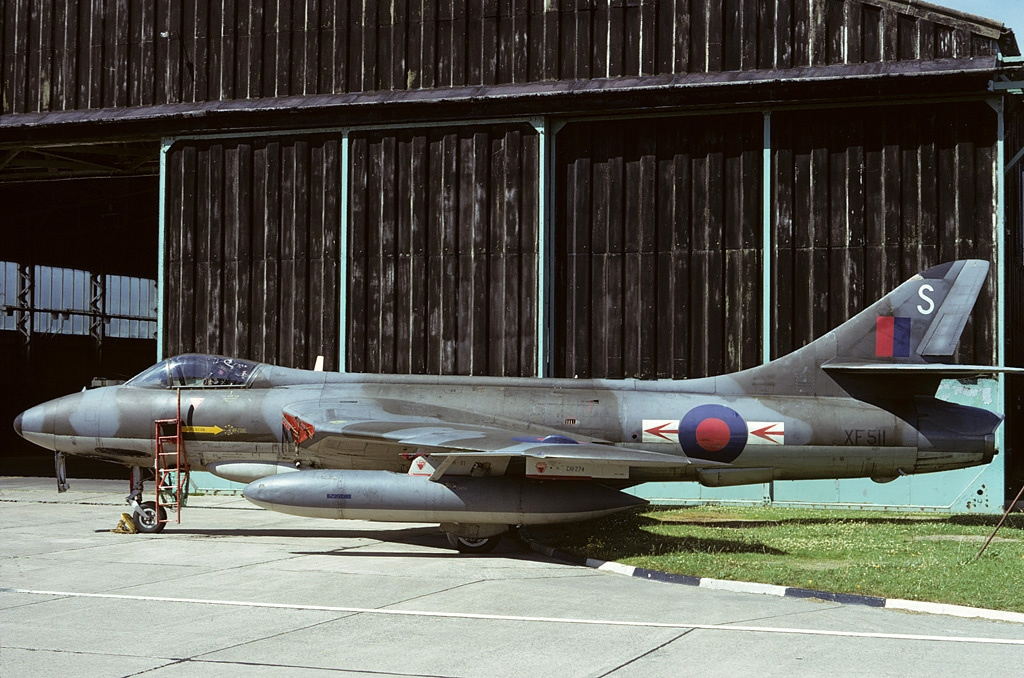
- Hawker Hunter of the type used. Flight Lieutenant Alan Pollock was the first person to fly a jet aircraft under the upper span of Tower Bridge.

Occurrence
- Date: 5 April 1968
- Summary: Aircraft flew under bridge following unofficial flypast
- Site: Tower Bridge, London, England, UK; 51°30′20″N 0°04′32″W

Aircraft
- Aircraft type: Hawker Hunter FGA.9
- Operator: 1 Squadron, Royal Air Force
- Registration: XF442
- Flight origin: RAF Tangmere, West Sussex, England, UK
- Destination: RAF West Raynham, Norfolk, England, UK
- Crew: 1
- Fatalities: 0
- Injuries: 0
- Survivors: 1

The Hawker Hunter Tower Bridge incident occurred on 5 April 1968, when Flight Lieutenant Alan Pollock (1936–2025), a Royal Air Force (RAF) Hawker Hunter pilot, performed unauthorised low flying over several London landmarks and then flew through the span of Tower Bridge on the River Thames. His actions were to mark the 50th anniversary of the founding of the RAF and as a demonstration against the Ministry of Defence for not recognising it.

Upon landing Pollock was arrested and later invalided out of the RAF on medical grounds, which avoided a court martial.

== Background ==
In the 1960s, the Ministry of Defence saw a shifting emphasis from crewed aircraft towards guided missiles, originating from the 1957 Defence White Paper by Minister of Defence Duncan Sandys. The British aircraft industry had slipped into general decline, and morale in the Royal Air Force (RAF) was low. Flight Lieutenant Alan Pollock, a flight commander in No. 1 (Fighter) Squadron RAF, was further displeased that no aerial displays had been planned to mark the RAF's 50th anniversary.

On 1 April 1968, Pollock and other members of No. 1 Squadron took part in anniversary leaflet raids on other RAF stations and on 4 April visited the soon-to-be-closed RAF Tangmere in West Sussex, where they performed a display.

== Incident ==
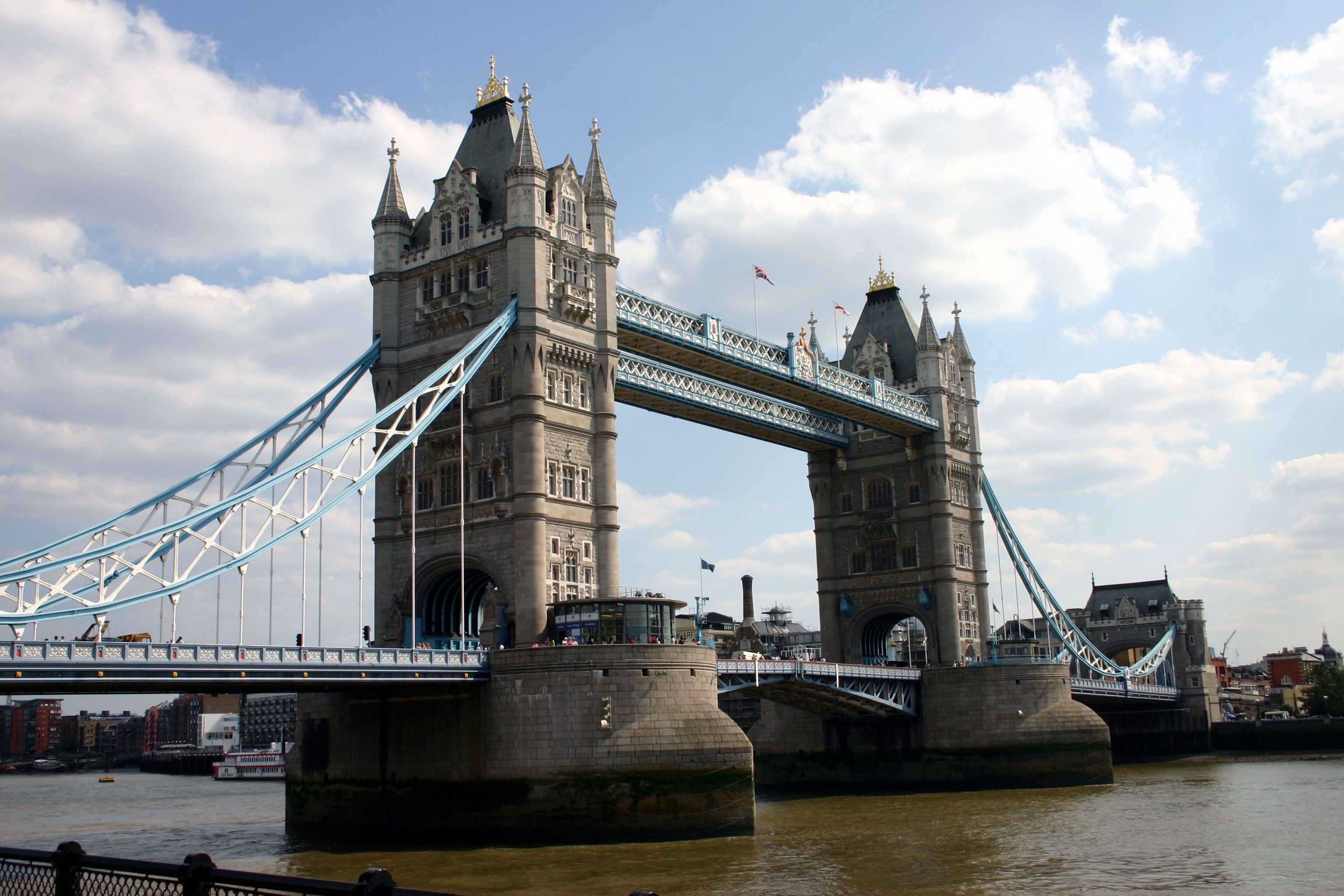
Tower Bridge

On 5 April 1968, Pollock decided on his own initiative to mark the occasion of the RAF anniversary with an unauthorised display. His flight left RAF Tangmere to return to RAF West Raynham in Norfolk, a route that took them over London. Immediately after takeoff, Pollock left the flight and flew at a low level. He made a low-altitude, high-speed pass over Dunsfold Aerodrome, Hawker's home airfield. He then took his Hawker Hunter FGA.9 (XF442), a single-seater, ground-attack jet fighter, over London at low level. He circled the Houses of Parliament three times as a demonstration against Prime Minister Harold Wilson's government, whose defence cuts had impacted the RAF. Pollock continued to the Royal Air Force Memorial on the Victoria Embankment and dipped his wings over the memorial in a gesture of respect. He then flew under the top span of Tower Bridge. He later wrote of the decision to fly through Tower Bridge:

Until this very instant I'd had absolutely no idea that, of course, Tower Bridge would be there. It was easy enough to fly over it, but the idea of flying through the spans suddenly struck me. I had just ten seconds to grapple with the seductive proposition which few ground attack pilots of any nationality could have resisted. My brain started racing to reach a decision. Years of fast low-level strike flying made the decision simple...

Knowing that he was likely to be stripped of his flying status as a result of this display, he proceeded to make low passes over several airfields (Wattisham, Lakenheath and Marham) in inverted flight at an altitude of about 200 feet (61 m) while returning to his base at RAF West Raynham. Shortly after his return, he was formally arrested by Flying Officer Roger Gilpin.

Although other pilots had flown under the upper span of Tower Bridge, Pollock was the first to do so in a jet aircraft.

== Aftermath ==
In the immediate aftermath of the incident, Pollock's unit was posted to North Africa without him while he remained on a charge. He was subsequently invalided out of the RAF on medical grounds. This avoided a court martial and the embarrassment to the government of Pollock publicising the reason for his stunt and perhaps receiving the support of the public.

Pollock died on 1 July 2025, at the age of 89.

== See also ==
- 1974 White House helicopter incident
