= Maryland Aviation Administration =

Aviation agency under the state of Maryland Department of Transportation

State agency overview
- Formed: 1929
- Jurisdiction: Maryland
- Headquarters: BWI Thurgood Marshall Airport
- Employees: 495 (authorized, FY 2012 budget)
- Annual budget: $230,810,098 (FY 2012)
- State agency executive: Shannetta R. Griffin, Executive Director and CEO
- Parent department: Maryland Department of Transportation
- Website: marylandaviation.com

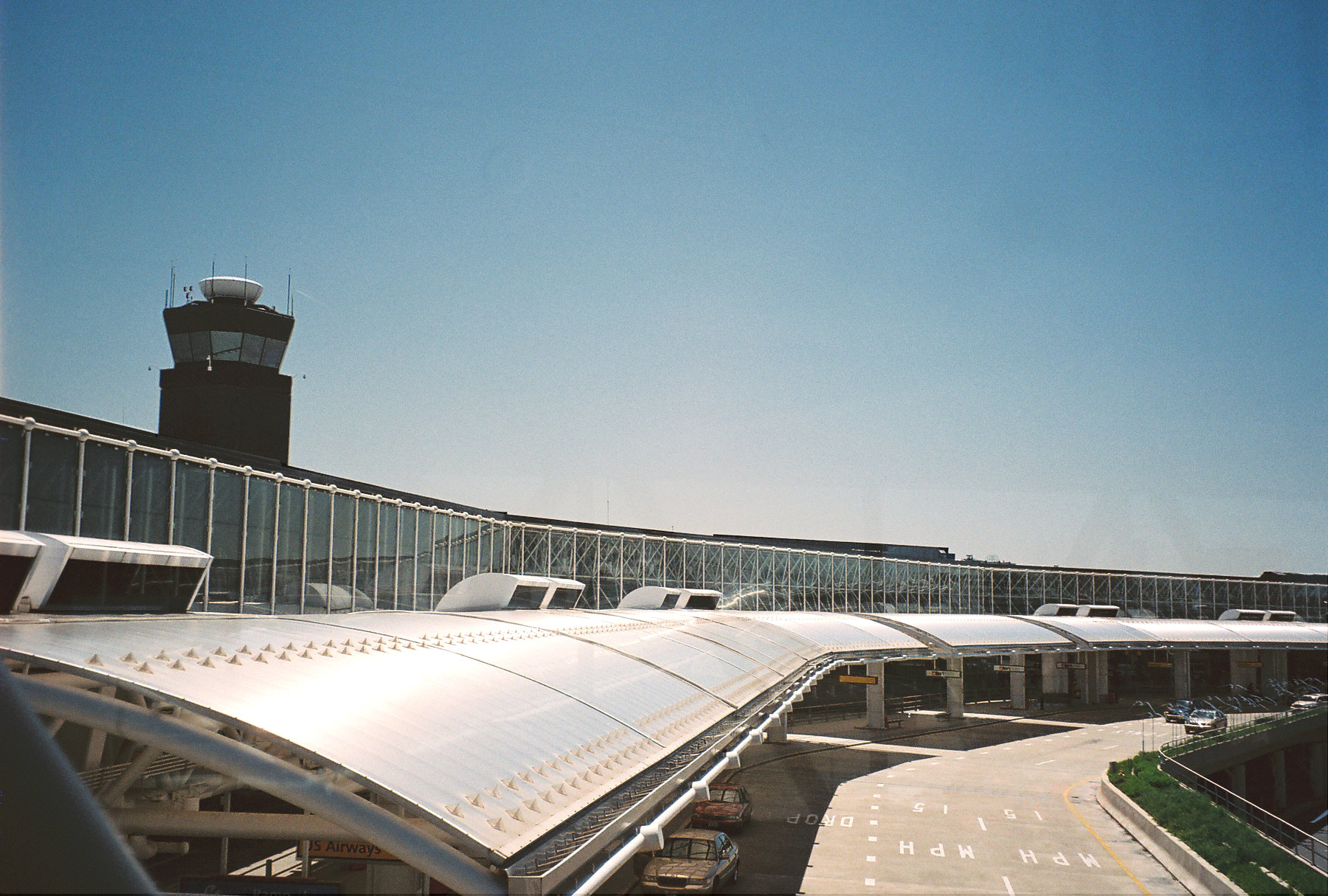
The Maryland Aviation Administration has its headquarters inside the terminal of Baltimore/Washington International Thurgood Marshall Airport

The Maryland Aviation Administration (MAA) is a state agency of Maryland and an airport authority under the jurisdiction of the Maryland Department of Transportation. The agency owns and operates Baltimore/Washington International Airport (BWI) and Martin State Airport. Its headquarters is on the third floor of the terminal building at BWI Airport, located in unincorporated Anne Arundel County.

In 1920 The Maryland State Aviation Commission was formed by Governor Ritchie, appointing Dr. Joeseph S. Ames, W. Frank Robert, Temple N. Joyce, Garland W. Powell, William B. Tipton and J. Fletcher Rolph.

In 1929, the State Aviation Commission was established in Maryland to inspect and license commercial airports, flight schools and flight instructors. The agency was renamed as the State Aviation Administration in 1971 when it became a subordinate unit of the Maryland Department of Transportation. In 1989, its name became Maryland Aviation Administration.

BWI Airport became the responsibility of the MAA in 1972 when the State of Maryland purchased the airport from the city of Baltimore for $36 million. Previously known as Friendship International Airport, the airport was renamed Baltimore/Washington International Airport in 1973, then BWI Thurgood Marshall Airport on October 1, 2005. Martin State Airport, located in Baltimore County on the opposite side of Baltimore from BWI, was purchased by the State of Maryland and assigned to the MAA in 1975. Since the purchase of BWI in 1972, the MAA has grown from three employees to more than 200.

The MAA office developed the Maryland Aid to Private Airports Program, and Airport Equipment Loan Program.

The executive director of the MAA is appointed by the Maryland Secretary of Transportation, with the approval of the governor and advice from the Maryland Aviation Commission.
