= Baltimore/Washington International Airport =

Airport near Baltimore, Maryland, United States

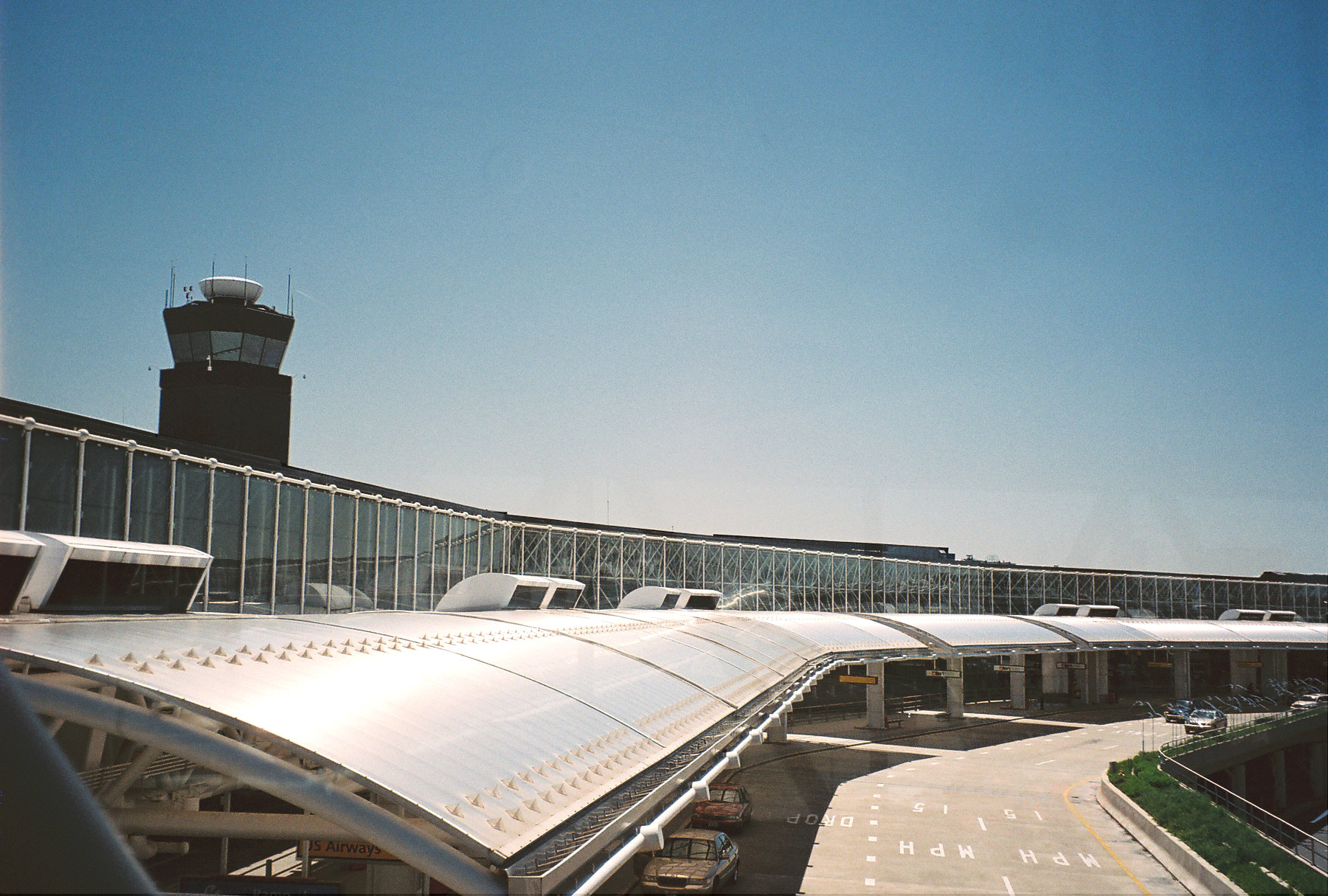
- The airport's main terminal in May 2009
- IATA: BWI; ICAO: KBWI; FAA LID: BWI; WMO: 72406

Summary
- Airport type: Public
- Owner/Operator: Maryland Aviation Administration (MDOT MAA)
- Serves: Baltimore metropolitan area; Washington, D.C. metropolitan area; South Central Pennsylvania
- Location: Anne Arundel County, Maryland, U.S.
- Opened: July 23, 1950; 76 years ago
- Operating base for: Southwest Airlines
- Elevation AMSL: 143 ft (44 m)
- Coordinates: 39°10′31″N 76°40′06″W
- Website: bwiairport.com

Maps
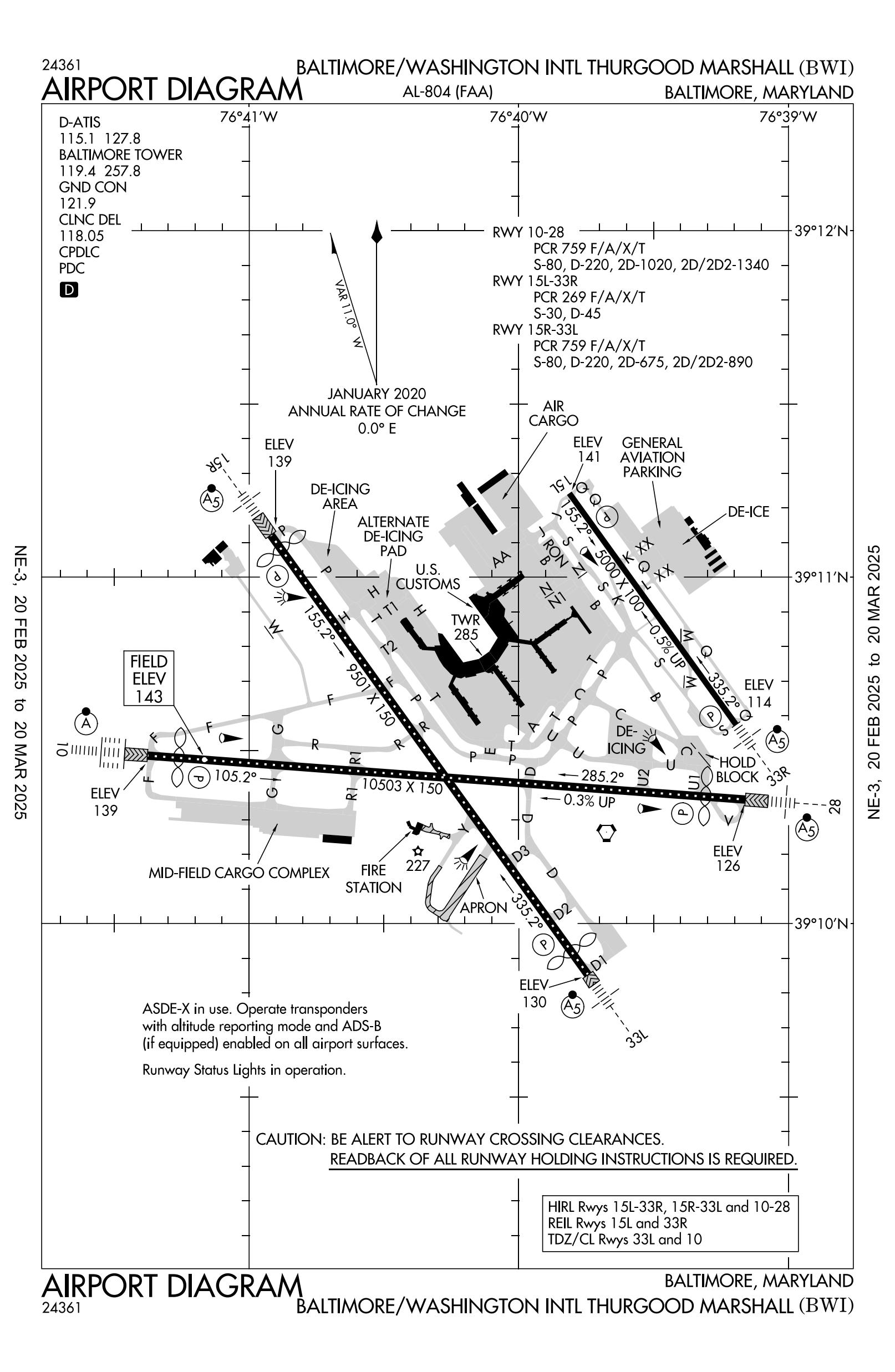
- FAA airport diagram
- Interactive map of Baltimore/Washington International Airport

Runways
Direction	Length		Surface
Direction	ft	m	Surface
10/28	10,503	3,201	Asphalt
15L/33R	5,000	1,524	Asphalt
15R/33L	9,501	2,896	Asphalt

Statistics (2025)
- Passengers: 25,215,520 ▼6.8%
- Aircraft operations: 237,879
- Cargo (metric tons): 566,680,703 lb (257,042 t)
- Sources: BWI Airport

Baltimore/Washington International Thurgood Marshall Airport (IATA: BWI, ICAO: KBWI, FAA LID: BWI), commonly referred to as Baltimore/Washington International Airport or simply as BWI Airport, is an international airport in Anne Arundel County, Maryland, located 9 miles (14 km; 7.8 nmi) south of downtown Baltimore and 30 miles (50 km) northeast of Washington, D.C. The airport is the 5th busiest in the Mid-Atlantic region of North America and is owned by the Maryland Aviation Administration.

BWI is one of three major airports that serve the Washington–Baltimore metropolitan area. Dulles International Airport (IAD), in Dulles, Virginia, and Ronald Reagan Washington National Airport (DCA), in Crystal City, Virginia, are the other two.

The airport serves as one of 13 U.S.-based operating bases for Southwest Airlines. In 2023, BWI recorded 12,849,636 passenger enplanements, making it the busiest airport in the Baltimore-Washington metropolitan area, ranked at #23 in passenger enplanements in the U.S., followed by Reagan National at number 24 and Dulles at 26.

In 2024, BWI ranked second in the Baltimore/Washington area with 27.06 million passengers served (slightly behind the 27.25 million passengers served at Dulles), just missing the record set in 2019.

Originally opened as Friendship International Airport, the airport was named in 2005 in honor of Thurgood Marshall, a Baltimore native and the first African American to serve as a U.S. Supreme Court justice.

== History ==
=== 20th century ===
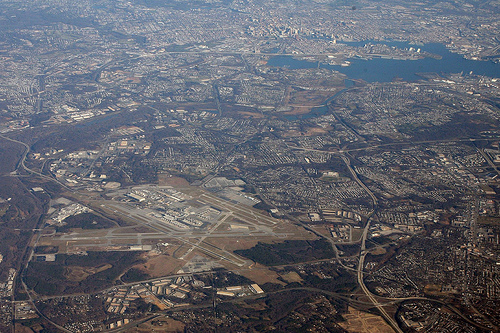
An aerial view of BWI Marshall Airport with downtown Baltimore in the background in September 2009

Planning for a new airport on 3,200 acres (1,300 ha) to serve the Baltimore–Washington metropolitan area began in 1944, just prior to the end of World War II, when the Baltimore Aviation Commission announced its decision that the best location to build a new airport would be on a 2,100-acre (850 ha) tract of land near Linthicum Heights, Maryland. The cost of building the airport was estimated at $9 million.

The site was chosen because it was a 15-minute drive from Downtown Baltimore, close to the Pennsylvania Railroad line, the Baltimore and Annapolis Railroad line, and the proposed Baltimore–Washington Parkway, and visibility at the site was generally good. An alternate site along Gov. Ritchie Highway at Furnace Branch was rejected by the United States Department of War, and another possible site at Lipin's Corner was deemed too far from Baltimore. The State Aviation Commission approved of the Linthicum Heights site in 1946.

Much of the land was purchased from Friendship Methodist Church in 1946, and ground was broken on May 2, 1947. Friendship Methodist Church held its last service on Easter Sunday in 1948. Friendship Methodist Church was razed to make room for the new airport. In addition, several pieces of land were bought, and 170 bodies buried in a cemetery were moved. Baltimore–Fort Meade Road was moved to the west to make way for the airport's construction.

Friendship International Airport was dedicated on June 24, 1950, by President Harry S. Truman. Truman arrived in a Douglas DC-6, then the official presidential airplane, from nearby Washington National Airport. Accompanying Truman were the Governor William Preston Lane Jr. and Baltimore Mayor Thomas D'Alesandro Jr., who was taking his first aircraft flight. The cost to construct the airport totaled $15 million. The following month, the airlines moved to the new airport from the old Baltimore Municipal Airport at Harbor Field in southeast Baltimore at 39.25°N 76.53°W. Eastern Airlines flew the first scheduled flight, a DC-3, into the airport at 12:01 am on July 23, 1950. Seven minutes later, the same plane was also the first flight to depart from the airport. Three hundred spectators came to watch the first flights arrive and depart.

The Official Airline Guide reports 52 weekday departures from the airport as of April 1957: 19 Eastern, 12 Capital, 8 American, four National, three TWA, three United, two Delta, and one Allegheny. The departures included a couple nonstop flights to Miami, but westward nonstop flights did not reach beyond Ohio. The airport's reach expanded when jet service started. The early Boeing 707s and Douglas DC-8s could not use Washington National Airport, and Dulles International Airport, which opened in 1962, had not yet opened, so Baltimore became Washington, D.C.'s jet airport from May 1959 to June 1959, when American and TWA began transcontinental 707 flights. By 1963, Friendship Int'l Airport was equipped with a 9,450 feet (2,880 m) runway, which could handle any commercial jet aircraft at that time.

In 1972, the Maryland Department of Transportation (MDOT) purchased Friendship International Airport from the City of Baltimore for $36 million. Under MDOT, the Maryland State Aviation Administration took over airfield operations, and the airport grew from three employees to more than 200. Plans to upgrade, improve, and modernize all Maryland airport facilities were announced almost immediately by Harry Hughes, then Maryland Secretary of Transportation and later Governor of Maryland.

On November 16, 1973, in an effort to attract passengers from the Washington metropolitan area, particularly Montgomery and Prince George's counties in suburban Maryland, the airport was renamed Baltimore/Washington International Airport. Its IATA code, originally BAL, was changed to BWI by the International Air Transport Association on April 20, 1980, and the change became official six months later, on October 26. The BWI code had previously been used by an airport in Bewani, Papua New Guinea.

In 1974, the first phase of the airport's modernization was completed at a cost of $30 million. Upgrades included improved instrument landing capabilities and runway systems, and construction of three new air cargo terminals, expanding the airport's freight capacity to 2.53 acres (1.02 ha).

In 1979, the terminal renovation program was completed, representing the most dramatic work of the airport's modernization, which was designed by DMJM along with Peterson & Brickbauer. The renovations more than doubled the size of BWI's terminal to 14.58 acres (5.90 ha), and the number of gates increased from 20 to 27. The total cost was $70 million. To continue the work, the BWI Development Council was established to support initiatives for airport development.

In 1980, the BWI Rail Station opened, providing a connection for passengers on the Northeast Corridor through Amtrak. BWI was the first airport in the U.S. with a dedicated intercity rail station. The station provided rail transit access to Washington, D.C., something that Dulles International Airport did not achieve until late 2022.

BWI added a new international terminal (Concourse E), designed by STV Group and William Nicholas Bodouva & Associates, in 1997. Dulles, though, continues to hold the lion's share of the region's international flights. BWI has not attracted as many long-haul international carriers.

The airport's first scheduled commercial transatlantic nonstop flights were Icelandic Air flights to Luxembourg Airport, which began November 3, 1978, but they ended in 1980 because of equipment shortages. World Airways began operating nonstop flights to London Gatwick Airport on May 30, 1981. Icelandic, now renamed Icelandair, restarted nonstop flights between BWI and Luxembourg in 1982. British Airways began nonstop flights between BWI and London Heathrow Airport in 1984. Aer Lingus, Air Jamaica, Air Aruba, Air Canada, Air Greenland, Condor, El Al, KLM, Ladeco, and Mexicana all previously flew to BWI.

Over the first half of the 1990s, runway 15L/33R was extended 1,800 feet (550 m) from 3,199 ft (975 m) to its current length of 5,000 ft (1,500 m), allowing it to be used by small passenger jets like the Boeing 737.

Beginning in the 1980s and for much of the 1990s, BWI was a hub for Piedmont Airlines and successor US Airways, but that airline's financial problems in the wake of the dot-com bust, the September 11 attacks, and low fare competition forced it to cut back. The airport has been a haven for low-cost flights in the Baltimore/Washington Metropolitan Area since Southwest Airlines' arrival in September 1993 and subsequent expansion in the early 2000s. Southwest is the airport's largest carrier, accounting for 56.12% of the airport's passengers in 2011. Southwest Airlines currently serves on average 245 daily departures to the U.S., Mexico, and the Caribbean.

=== 21st century ===
In January 2000, the BWI USO opened, the largest in the world at that time. Space-A flights operated by the U.S. Air Force's Air Mobility Command continue to have a significant presence at BWI. Flights from Ramstein Air Base and Joint Base McGuire-Dix-Lakehurst occur frequently. The facility serves 99 percent of military personnel traveling to and from duty stations in Europe, Southwest Asia, and the United States.

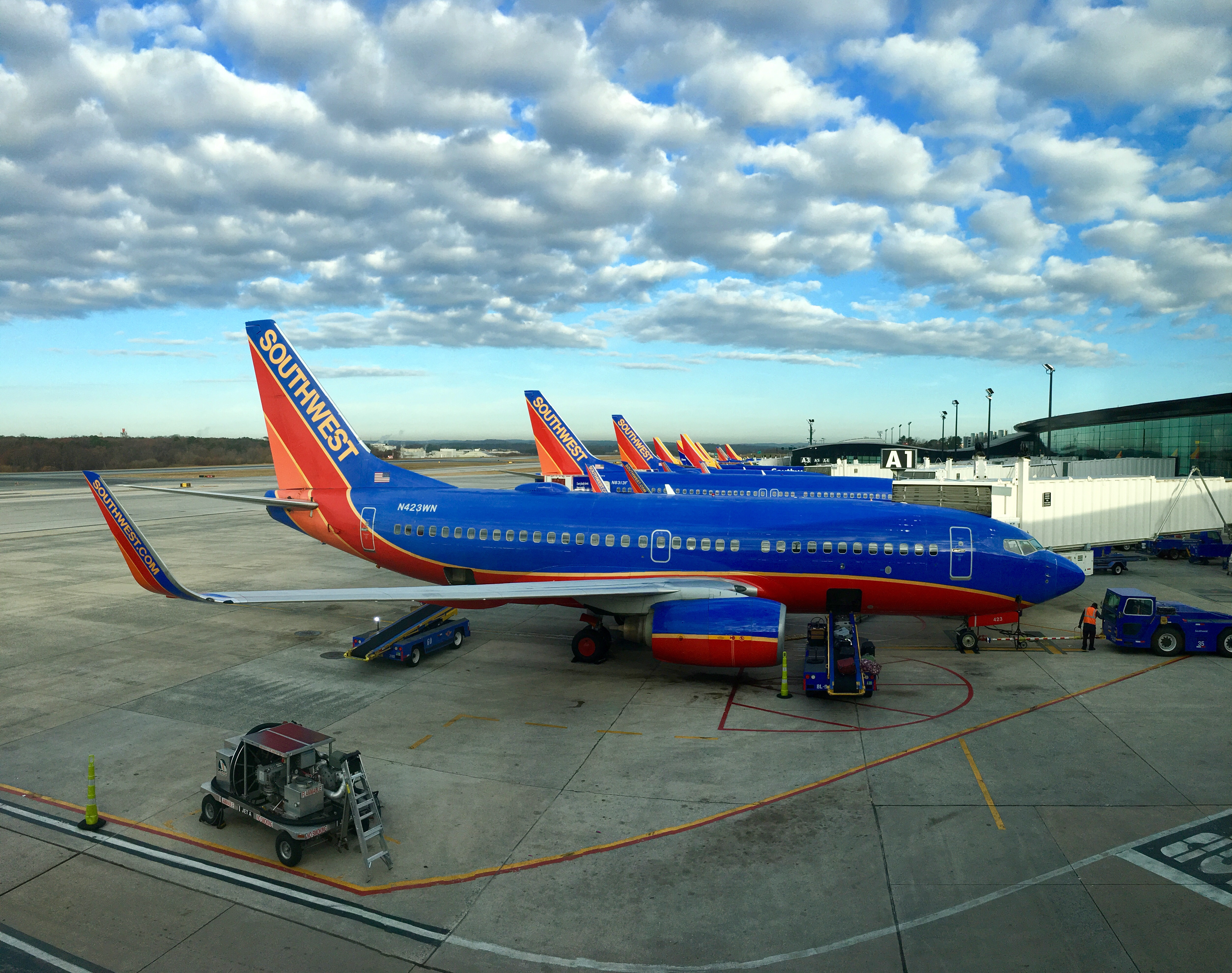
Southwest Airlines planes at Concourses A-B in February 2017

In July 2000, Ghana Airways began service from BWI to Accra. The airline operated the flight with McDonnell Douglas DC-10s and sought to serve the many people of West African origin residing in the region.

Four years later, in July 2004, the U.S. federal government prohibited Ghana Airways from flying to the U.S. According to officials, the company was operating on an expired license and had disobeyed orders to stop flying an unsafe plane.

In 2005, to accommodate Southwest's extensive presence at the airport, Concourses A and B were expanded, renovated, and integrated with one another to house all of that airline's operations there for their major operating base. The new facility, designed by URS Corporation, opened on May 22, 2005. On October 1 of that year, the airport was renamed Baltimore/Washington International Thurgood Marshall Airport, to honor former U.S. Supreme Court justice Thurgood Marshall, a native of Baltimore.

In June 2006, North American Airlines introduced a link to Accra via Banjul, The Gambia, marking the restoration of direct flights between Baltimore and Africa. The carrier employed Boeing 767s on the route. Afterward, it made the Accra flight nonstop and added a route to Lagos. North American ended all scheduled service in May 2008.

In 2008, Health magazine named BWI the second-healthiest airport in the United States. In 2009 the airport had a six percent increase in air travelers due to the proliferation of discount flights. In a 2009 survey of airport service quality by Airports Council International, BWI was the world's top ranking airport in the 15-to-25-million-passenger category. BWI also ranked seventh, in medium-sized airports, based on customer satisfaction conducted by J.D. Power and Associates.

On August 5, 2014, the airport's little-used runway, 04–22, was permanently closed. It was 6,000 feet (1,800 meters) long and used primarily when the main runways needed to be closed for repairs. The last operation on the runway was a Southwest Airlines flight from Chicago Midway Airport, which arrived at 4:18 AM.

In 2015, Norwegian Air Shuttle announced it would begin flights from the airport to Guadeloupe and Martinique. In an interview with The Baltimore Sun, Norwegian Air Shuttle CEO Bjorn Kjos said, "Baltimore is high on the list for long-haul destinations", hinting at further expansion into Europe. In mid-2018, however, the airline ceased all flights out of Baltimore, attributing the cessation to heavy financial losses.

In early 2016, a partnership between the airport and Towson University's WTMD radio station was announced, including a new concert series that takes place at the terminal's baggage claim on the lower level. Local bands included Wye Oak and others. The new series followed the release event of Animal Collective's new album Painting With on November 25, 2015, where the new album was streamed throughout the airport.

In late 2018, construction began on a $60 million, five-gate expansion of terminal A for Southwest Airlines. The new expansion began operations in 2021. 2018 also marked a new annual record for passenger traffic at BWI Marshall Airport with over 27.1 million passengers.

In 2021, commuter airline Southern Airways Express ended its hub at BWI and switched its East Coast hub to Dulles International Airport. In addition, the airport's international growth continued with the addition of a twice-weekly flight by Air Senegal to Blaise Diagne International Airport in Dakar, Senegal, via a stop in Kennedy International Airport in Queens, New York City. However, in January 2023, Air Senegal ceased the New York City to Baltimore portion of this route, dropping Baltimore back down to only two year-round transatlantic flights. In 2022, Play began daily nonstop flights from Baltimore to Reykjavík, Iceland, which was quickly followed a few weeks later by Icelandair also resuming flights from BWI to Reykjavík.

On January 26, 2023, Copa Airlines announced they would start operating direct flights to Panama City, making it the first Central America-based airline to operate out of the airport. The flights began as scheduled in late June 2023.

In August 2024, Icelandair announced that they would be partnering with Southwest Airlines to better connect their customers, and that the initial North American gateway between the airlines would be BWI.

From 2024 to 2025, BWI lost service from six airlines: Air Canada, Allegiant Air, Condor, Contour, JetBlue and Play.

On May 2, 2026 (coinciding with the closure of Spirit Airlines), it was announced that JetBlue would be returning to BWI Airport; JetBlue will offer three daily flights between Baltimore and Fort Lauderdale, Florida beginning July 9, 2026. In addition, JetBlue will add service between Baltimore and San Juan, Puerto Rico starting on November 2, 2026.

==== Airport upgrades ====
In October 2022, a proposed renovation and expansion to BWI Airport was announced. It has been described as the "largest capital project in the history of BWI Airport". This project includes major upgrades to the airports' Baggage Handling System as well as a renovation and expansion to the airports' A/B Connector, which will provide passengers with a direct connection between concourses A and B.

The project (according to airport management as well as Clark Construction, the company hired for the project) is expected to "transform the customer experience by adding a direct connection between concourses, expanding airline hold rooms, creating new food and retail concession spaces, enhancing restrooms, and introducing a new, fully in-line baggage handling system for Southwest." The project was initially estimated to cost $425 million and was expected to be fully completed in summer 2026.

On January 29, 2025, BWI received $41.5 million from Maryland's Board of Public Works for improvements to airport security and baggage handling, with $5.5 million to expand the airport's security checkpoints in concourses D and E, and $36 million to improve baggage systems in the international terminal. These upgrades are underway as of July 2026.

On January 8, 2026, it was announced that the new A/B Connector had been completed and would open the following day (January 9) for passengers and flights. The opening came months ahead of its original schedule, initially expecting to open in summer 2026. The cost of the project was nearly $500 million.

On July 4, 2026, it was announced by the U.S. Department of Transportation that BWI Airport had secured a $62.4 million grant, which will be used to modernize runways/tarmacs and runway lighting, with upgrades beginning on July 22. The upgrades were expected to be completed on October 8, 2026. On October 15, 2026, runway 10-28, the longest runway in the airport, reopened following rehabilitation and modernization work.

== Facilities ==
=== Runways ===
==== Current runways ====
BWI Airport covers 3,160 acres (4.9 sq mi; 12.8 km^{2}) of land and has three active runways:

- Runway 10/28: 10,503 ft × 150 ft (3,201 m × 46 m). Runway 28 is the main takeoff runway, unless wind conditions require takeoffs from Runway 15R. Runway 10 is equipped with ILS category IIIB, and runway 28 is equipped with ILS category I.
- Runway 15R/33L: 9,501 ft × 150 ft (2,896 m × 46 m): Runway 33L is the main landing runway, unless wind or fog conditions require landings on Runway 10 with its higher ILS rating. The Thomas A. Dixon Aircraft Observation Area at Friendship Park overlooks Runway 33L. Equipped with ILS category I in both directions.
- Runway 15L/33R: 5,000 ft × 100 ft (1,524 m × 30 m). Main runway for general aviation and smaller commercial aircraft. Originally 3,200 ft (980 m), it was extended in the 1990s and is able to handle emergency landings by Boeing 737 aircraft, by far the most popular plane at the airport. Equipped with ILS category I in both directions.

==== Former runways ====
- Runway 4/22: 6,000 ft × 150 ft (1,829 m × 46 m). Closed in 2014, this runway is now part of taxiways and aprons.

=== Terminal ===
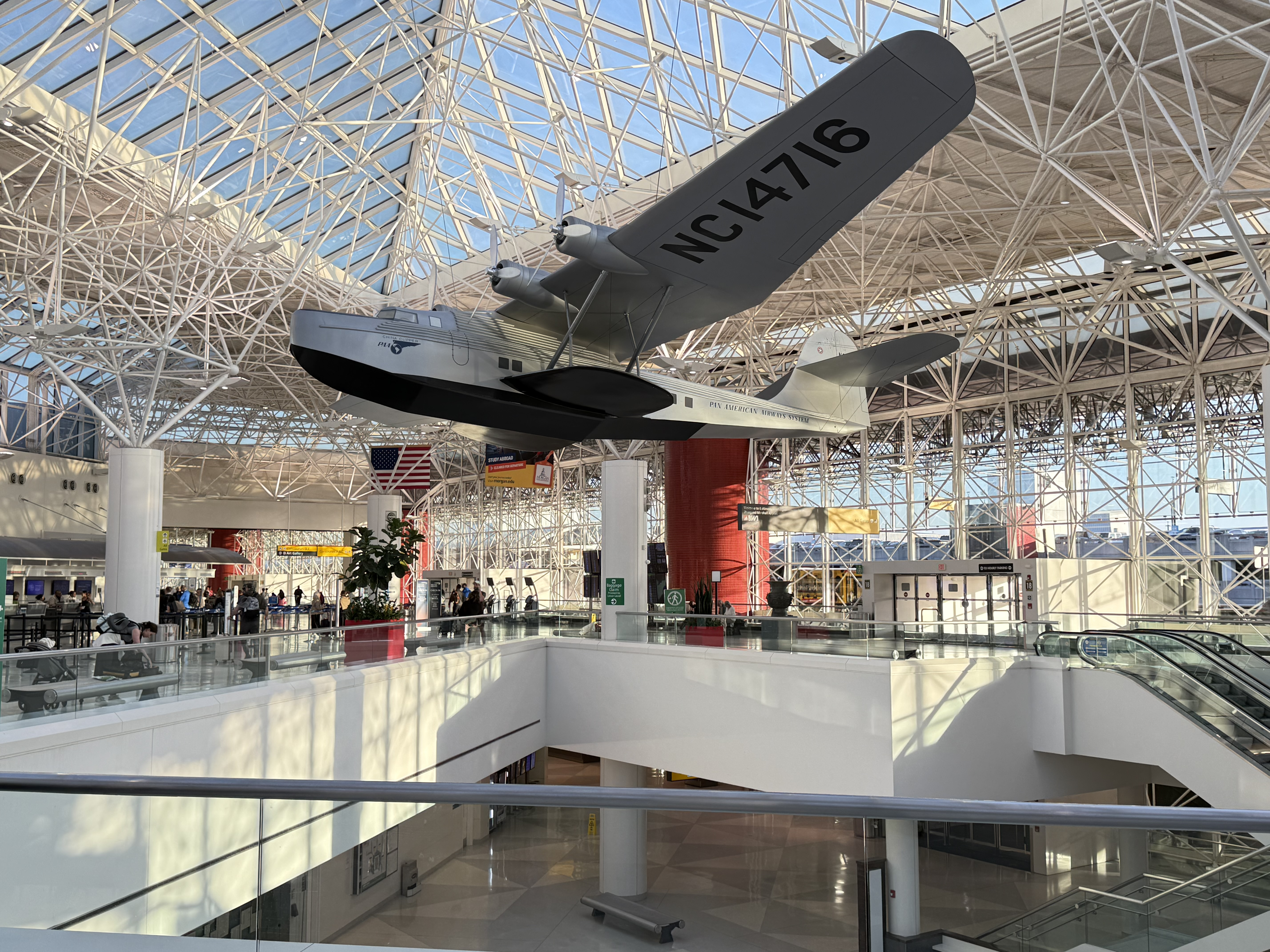
A China Clipper replica at BWI Pier E

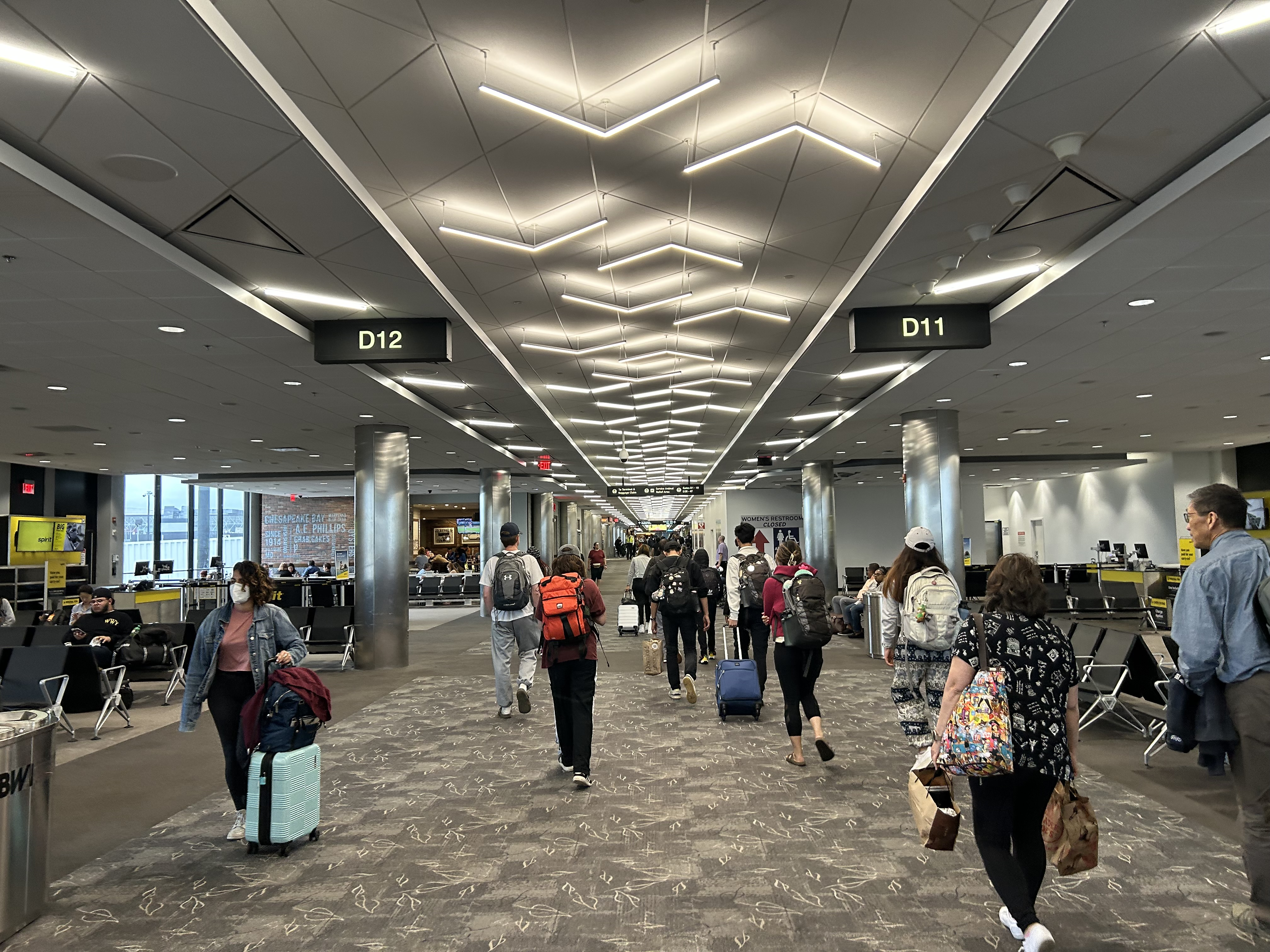
Interior of Concourse D

Baltimore/Washington International Airport has five concourses with 78 gates. Of these, 14 are equipped for international arrivals (all gates in Concourse E and three gates in Concourse D).

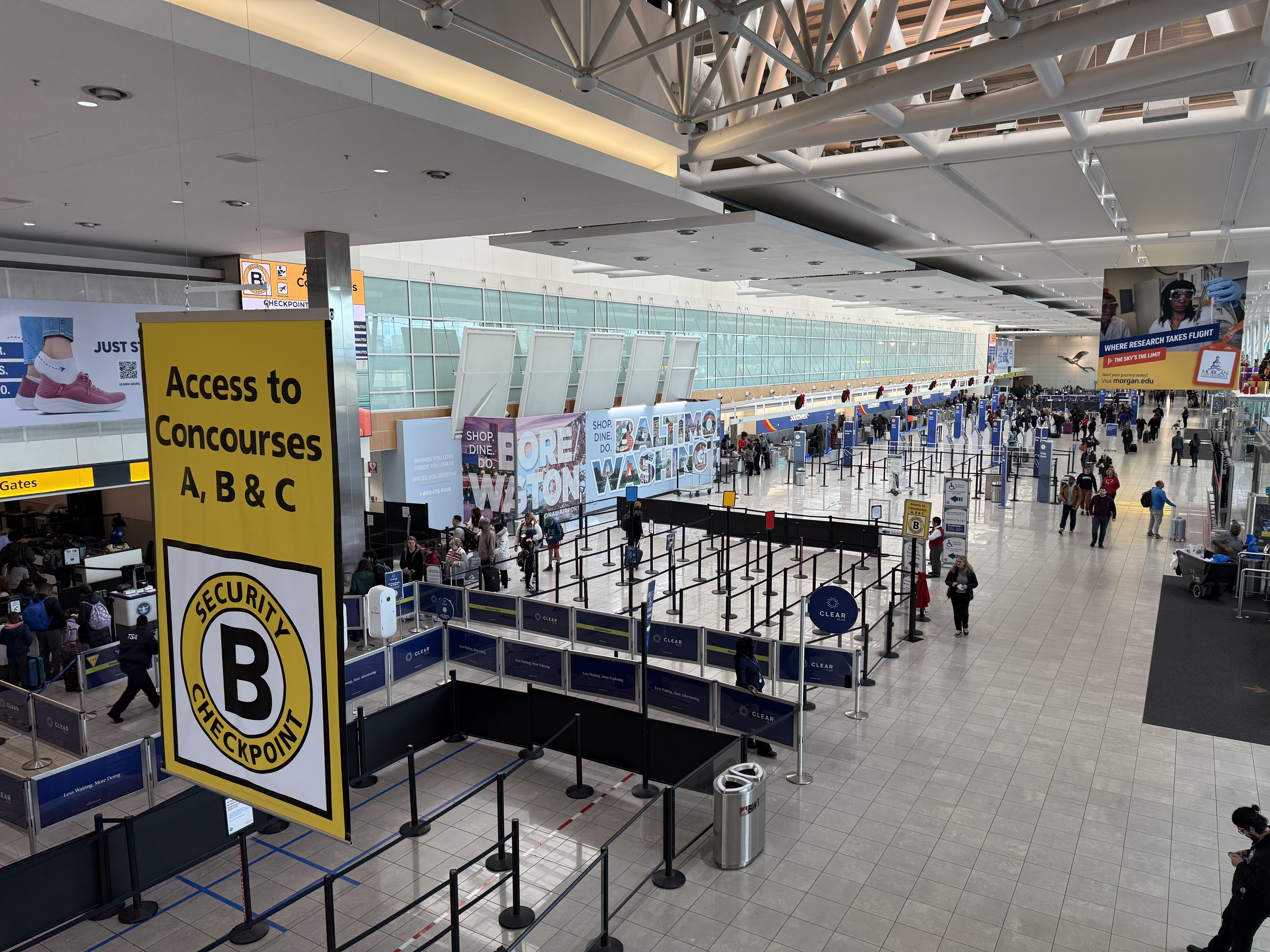
Security check area near Concourse A/B/C

- Concourse A has 16 gates. Exclusive use for Southwest.
- Concourse B has 15 gates. Exclusive use for Southwest.
- Concourse C has 14 gates. Used by Southwest, American and Bermudair.
- Concourse D has 22 gates. Used by other domestic carriers.
- Concourse E has 11 gates. Used by international carriers, and Southwest and Frontier for non pre-cleared international arrivals. Gates E2, E7, E9, E10 and E12 are arrivals-only.

=== Ground transportation ===
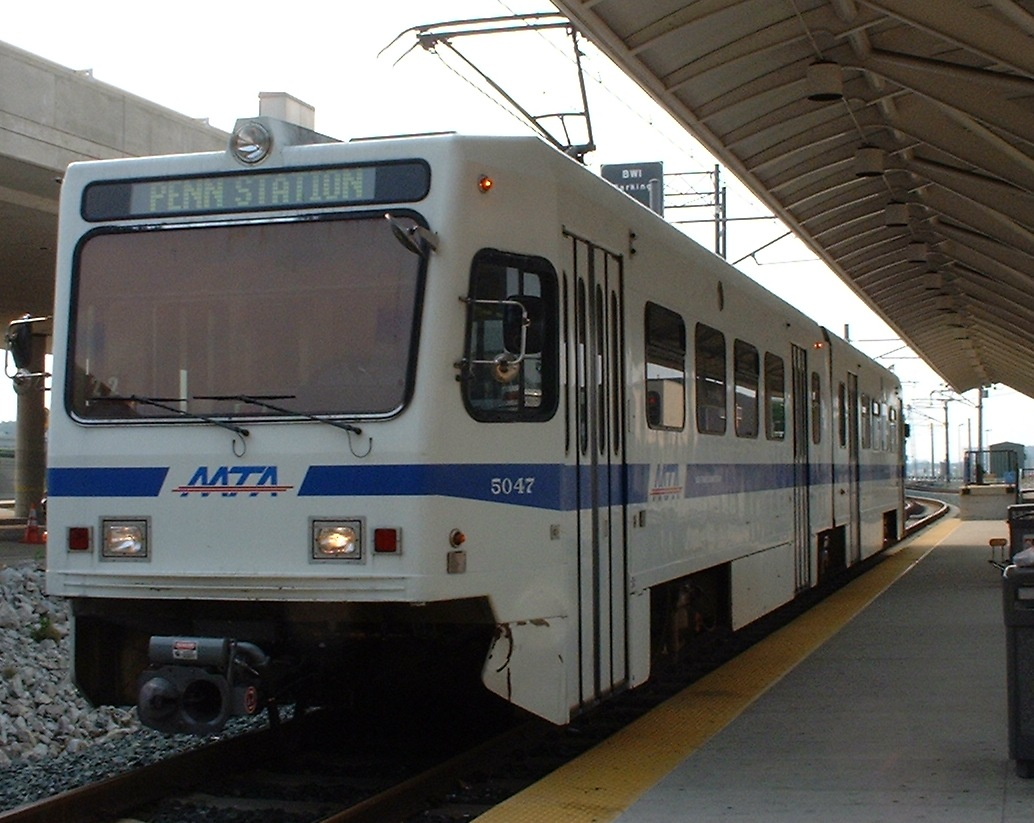
A Baltimore Light RailLink train at the BWI Airport station

BWI was ranked one of the "Top 10 Easiest U.S. Airports to Get to" by Aviation.com in 2007.

BWI is located at the southeast terminus of Interstate 195, a spur route providing connections to the Baltimore–Washington Parkway and Interstate 95. The airport has a variety of parking options, ranging from a garage within walking distance to the concourses to remote parking lots that require shuttles to access.

A light rail station, with service to downtown Baltimore and other locations via Baltimore Light RailLink, is located next to Concourse E.

Amtrak and MARC trains regularly serve the separate BWI Rail Station, located on airport grounds but about a mile from the terminal, with free shuttle bus service connecting the destinations. Trains on Amtrak's Northeast Corridor, Acela, and MARC's Penn Line stop at the station and proceed to destinations including Union Station in Washington, D.C. and Penn Station in Baltimore.

Local buses that stop at the airport terminal include the Maryland Transit Administration's 75 route to Patapsco station on Light RailLink and Arundel Mills Mall, as well as route 201, which connects the airport to Shady Grove station on the Washington Metro.

Passenger van service to and from the Eastern Shore and Western Maryland is available through BayRunner Shuttle with services to and from BWI to Kent Island, Easton, Cambridge, Salisbury, Ocean Pines, and Ocean City (for the Eastern Shore) and Grantsville, Frostburg, Cumberland, Hancock, Hagerstown, and Frederick (for Western Maryland). There are also numerous private car, rental car, and cab services, as well as shuttles that go to and from BWI to local hotels; Baltimore and Washington and their suburbs; and Central and Western Maryland.

Some former ground transportation services have been discontinued, including bicycle-sharing system from the Boston-based company Zagster and the Washington Metro's B30 bus, which was an express service to Greenbelt station.

=== Other facilities ===
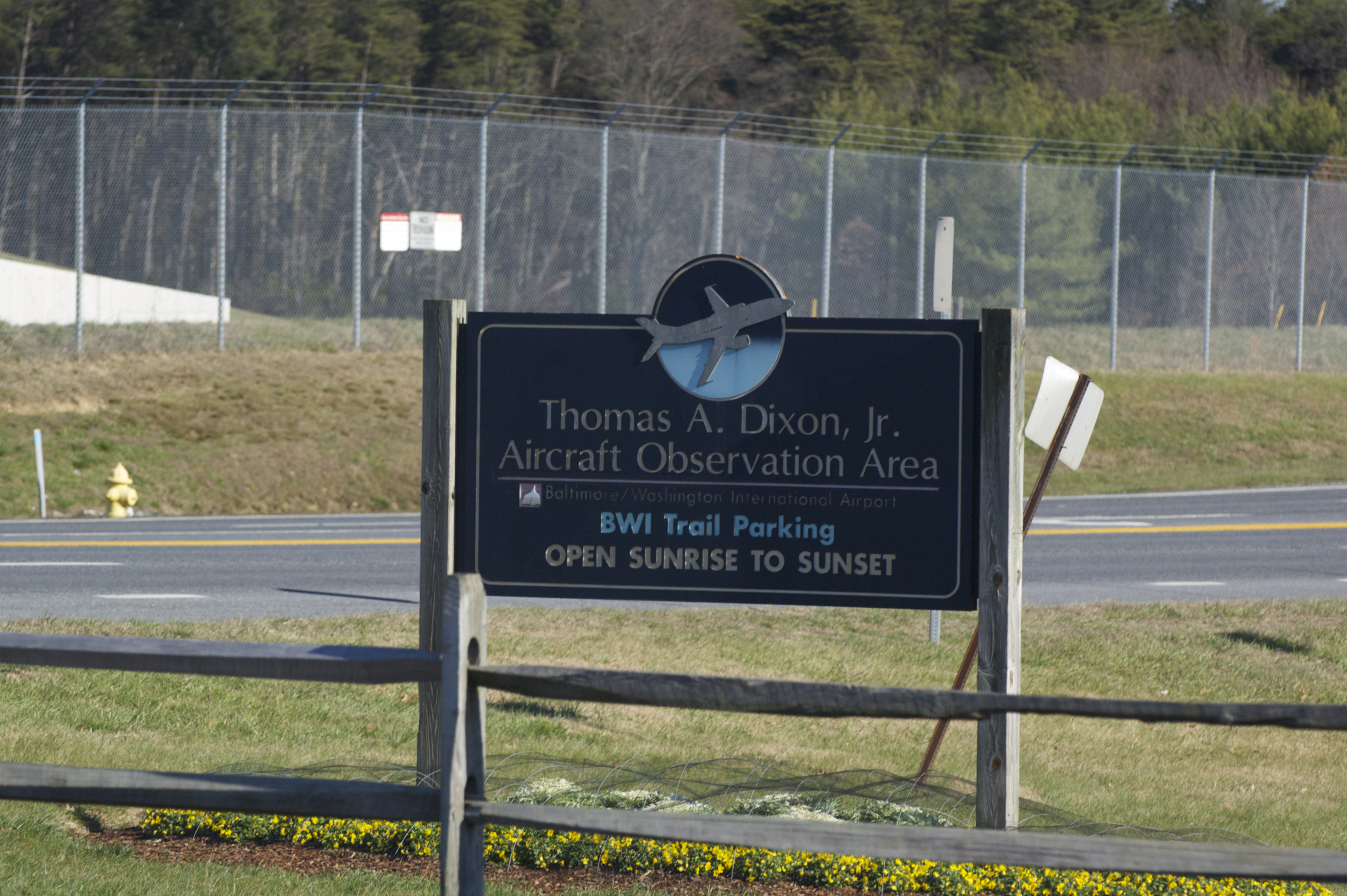
The airport's Thomas A Dixon Jr. Aircraft Observation Area

In 1985, the BWI Business District was established as a way to formalize businesses and hotels operating adjacent to the airport. The district comprises two smaller districts located to the north (West Nursery Hotel District) and west (Stoney Run District) of the airport. Numerous traveler resources and employment centers are located within both districts, such as the BWI Rail Station and BWI Rental Car Facility in the Stoney Run District, and the BWI Business District Light Rail Station, the NSA Friendship Annex, and dozens of hotel facilities in the West Nursery District.

A U.S. Department of Homeland Security facility is located in the lower level of the main terminal, near the international arrivals area / Concourse E Baggage Claim. This facility also includes a Global Entry Enrollment Center, as well as a TSA PreCheck enrollment facility.

In the early 1990s, BWI Airport opened the Thomas A. Dixon Aircraft Observation Area at Friendship Park. The observation plaza features a playground and a terrace overlooking the southern approach to the airport's 15R-33L runway. From this vantage point, several planes can be viewed simultaneously as they prepare for landing. The southern loop of the 13.3 mile BWI Trail travels through the park, providing cyclist and pedestrian access to the park.

In addition to the Thomas A. Dixon Aircraft Observation Area, which provides spotters with views of aircraft landing on runway 33L, spotters can use one of several parking garages to view arrivals to runway 15R, with some arrivals appearing to be below the spotter.

The Maryland Aviation Administration has its headquarters on the third floor of the terminal building.

== Airlines and destinations ==
=== Passenger ===
Airlines	Destinations
Alaska Airlines	Seattle/Tacoma; Seasonal: Portland (OR)
American Airlines	Charlotte, Dallas/Fort Worth, Miami; Seasonal: Chicago–O'Hare
American Eagle	Chicago–O'Hare; Seasonal: Miami
Avelo Airlines	Seasonal: New Haven, Wilmington (NC)
BermudAir	Bermuda; Seasonal: Anguilla, Providenciales (begins December 24, 2026)
Breeze Airways	Burlington (VT), Vero Beach
British Airways	London–Heathrow
Contour Airlines	Macon/Warner Robins (GA)
Copa Airlines	Panama City–Tocumen
Delta Air Lines	Atlanta, Detroit, Minneapolis/St. Paul, Salt Lake City
Delta Connection	Boston
Frontier Airlines	Atlanta, Cancún, Charlotte, Chicago–O'Hare, Dallas/Fort Worth, Detroit, Fort Lauderdale, Houston–Intercontinental, Miami, New Orleans, Orlando, San Juan, Tampa; Seasonal: Denver
Icelandair	Reykjavík–Keflavík
JetBlue	Fort Lauderdale, San Juan
Southwest Airlines	Albany, Albuquerque, Aruba, Atlanta, Austin, Birmingham (AL), Boston, Buffalo, Cancún, Charleston (SC), Charlotte, Chicago–Midway, Cincinnati, Cleveland, Columbus–Glenn, Dallas–Love, Denver, Detroit, Fort Lauderdale, Fort Myers, Grand Rapids, Greenville/Spartanburg, Hartford, Houston–Hobby, Indianapolis, Jacksonville (FL), Kansas City, Knoxville, Las Vegas, Long Island/Islip, Los Angeles, Louisville, Manchester (NH), Memphis, Miami, Milwaukee, Minneapolis/St. Paul, Montego Bay, Myrtle Beach, Nashville, New Orleans, Norfolk, Orlando, Philadelphia (begins March 11, 2027), Phoenix–Sky Harbor, Pittsburgh, Portland (ME), Providence, Punta Cana, Raleigh/Durham, Richmond, Rochester (NY), Sacramento, Salt Lake City, San Antonio, San Diego, San Francisco, San Jose (CA), San Juan, Sarasota, Savannah, St. Louis, St. Maarten, St. Thomas, Tampa, West Palm Beach; Seasonal: Belize City, Destin/Fort Walton Beach, Grand Cayman, Liberia (CR), Nassau, Oklahoma City, Panama City (FL), Portland (OR), Providenciales, San José (CR), Seattle/Tacoma
Sun Country Airlines	Seasonal: Minneapolis/St. Paul
United Airlines	Chicago–O'Hare, Denver, Houston–Intercontinental, Los Angeles, San Francisco
United Express	Houston–Intercontinental

=== Cargo ===
Airlines	Destinations
DHL Aviation	Cincinnati
FedEx Feeder operated by Mountain Air Cargo	Newark
UPS Airlines	Louisville

== Statistics ==
=== Top destinations ===
Busiest domestic routes from BWI (September 2025 – August 2026)
Rank	City	Passengers	Carriers
1	Atlanta, Georgia	758,730	Delta, Southwest, Spirit, Frontier
2	Orlando, Florida	615,960	Frontier, Southwest, Spirit
3	Fort Lauderdale, Florida	405,520	Frontier, Southwest, Spirit
4	Denver, Colorado	399,480	Frontier, Southwest, United
5	Charlotte, North Carolina	378,410	American, Frontier, Southwest, Spirit
6	Boston, Massachusetts	367,740	Delta, Southwest, Spirit
7	Tampa, Florida	319,540	Frontier, Southwest, Spirit
8	Miami, Florida	299,050	American, Frontier, Southwest, Spirit
9	Chicago–O'Hare, Illinois	258,470	American, Frontier, Southwest, Spirit, United
10	Las Vegas, Nevada	250,270	Southwest, Spirit

Busiest international routes from BWI (September 2025 – August 2026)
Rank	City	Passengers	Carriers
1	Cancún, Mexico	107,844	Frontier, Southwest, Spirit
2	Punta Cana, Dominican Republic	84,866	Southwest, Spirit
3	Montego Bay, Jamaica	79,082	Southwest, Spirit
4	London–Heathrow, United Kingdom	67,008	British Airways
5	Reykjavík–Keflavík, Iceland	53,897	Icelandair
6	Panama City, Panama	30,322	Copa
7	Oranjestad, Aruba	19,792	Southwest
8	San José, Costa Rica	8,221	Southwest
9	Liberia, Costa Rica	7,441	Southwest
10	Nassau, Bahamas	6,050	Southwest

=== Airline market share ===
Largest airlines at BWI (September 2025 – August 2026)
Rank	Airline	Passengers	Share
1	Southwest Airlines	16,732,000	73.83%
2	Delta Air Lines	1,366,000	6.03%
3	Frontier Airlines	1,205,000	5.32%
4	United Airlines	1,130,000	4.98%
5	American Airlines	947,000	4.18
6	Other (Note: Includes flights operated by American Eagle, Delta Connection, and United Express partner airlines. The specific airline total passenger numbers only include mainline operations.)	1,284,000	5.67%

=== Annual traffic ===
Annual passenger traffic at BWI (2006–present)
Year	Passengers	Year	Passengers	Year	Passengers
2006	20,698,967	2013	22,498,353	2020	11,204,511
2007	21,044,384	2014	22,312,676	2021	18,868,429
2008	20,488,881	2015	23,823,532	2022	22,804,744
2009	20,953,615	2016	25,122,651	2023	26,200,143
2010	21,936,461	2017	26,369,411	2024	27,059,733
2011	22,391,785	2018	27,145,831	2025	25,215,520
2012	22,679,987	2019	26,993,896	2026	

== Accidents and incidents ==
- On March 25, 1953, a USAF North American B-25 Mitchell, aircraft serial # 44–29864, crashed 3 miles SE of Glen Burnie, Maryland on approach to then Friendship Int'l Airport because of weather factors. All three occupants on board were killed. This was the first fatal accident at or near the airport since its opening in July 1950.
- On February 22, 1974, Samuel Byck entered BWI, shot and killed an aviation police officer and stormed onto Delta Air Lines Flight 523. He killed the first officer and severely wounded the captain. He intended to hijack the plane and crash it into the White House. A gunfight ensued, and Byck was mortally wounded by a police officer from outside the aircraft. Byck killed himself before police stormed the aircraft. The attempted hijacking was later portrayed in the 2004 film, The Assassination of Richard Nixon, with Sean Penn and Naomi Watts.
- On January 9, 1985, a Westinghouse Electric Corporation North American Sabreliner on short final nosed down into the displaced threshold of runway 33L, causing the aircraft to bounce and collapsing the landing gear after settling on the runway. Both occupants survived, but the aircraft was substantially damaged.
- On December 10, 1992, a Volpar Turboliner operated by Connie Kalitta Services crashed 3 miles (4.8 km) west of BWI in Elkridge due to a shift in cargo in the aircraft during final approach. The sole occupant, the pilot, was killed.
- On May 6, 2009, a World Airways DC-10-30 with registration N139WA operating as Flight 8535 from Leipzig, Germany for the Military Airlift Command experienced a hard landing at BWI. As a result of the captain's response to the hard landing, the plane's nose wheel struck the runway hard two times. The aircraft blew one of its front tires and had to execute a go-around before landing successfully. Several passengers were injured, including the first officer, who suffered back trauma. The age of the aircraft (29 years 11 months at the time of the accident) and the extent of damage to the front landing gear and fuselage resulted in the aircraft being written off. The aircraft was parted out and is now used on-site for fire/rescue training and practice purposes.
- On December 12, 2014, Southwest Airlines Flight 3118, a Boeing 737-700, encountered multiple bird strikes while on approach to BWI. There were no injuries to the 145 passengers and crew, but the aircraft was substantially damaged. There was damage to the 178 forward pressure bulkhead and left wing fixed leading edge main rib. The plane was repaired and placed back into service.
- On August 4, 2016, Southwest Airlines Flight 149, a Boeing 737-300 bound for Atlanta Int'l Airport, suffered a failure of the nose landing gear during pushback at BWI because of the tug operators excessive speed during pushback. The nose gear collapsed in a forward direction, causing severe damage to the gear structure, the nose gear wheel and crushing the forward bulkhead. There were no injuries among the 6 crew and 129 passengers but the aircraft, which was 23 years old at the time of the incident, was substantially damaged and written off.
- On February 7, 2020, a Mountain Air Cargo Cessna 208 Caravan, operating for FedEx, was conducting an instrument landing system (ILS) approach in night meteorological conditions to runway 10 at BWI. After landing safely, it was discovered the pilot struck four separate approach light towers as well as a localizer antenna, causing substantial damage to the plane's empennage, right horizontal stabilizer, right wing strut, and front cargo pod. A piece of an approach light was also caught on the plane's right landing gear. The aircraft was substantially damaged, but repaired and placed back into service.
- On September 14, 2024, a Piper PA-32 Cherokee Six crashed just off the departure end of runway 15L, the general aviation runway at BWI. The pilot and two passengers on board did not sustain any major injuries, but the aircraft did sustain substantial damage.

== In popular culture ==
BWI has been a backdrop in several films, Goldfinger (1964), Broadcast News (1987), Company Business (1991), Home for the Holidays (1995), and Twelve Monkeys (1995).

It was also featured in the reality TV series Airline (2004–2005), an episode of the TV series House of Cards, and the TV documentaries Honor Flight (2007) and Eatin' Crabs Chesapeake Style (2009).
