= Tipton Airport =

Fort Meade Executive Airport
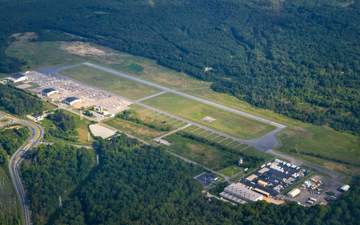
- IATA: FME; ICAO: KFME; FAA LID: FME

Summary
- Airport type: Public
- Owner: Tipton Airport Authority
- Location: Fort Meade / Odenton, Maryland
- Elevation AMSL: 150 ft (46 m)
- Coordinates: 39°05′07″N 076°45′34″W
- Website: TiptonAirport.org

Map
- Location of airport in Maryland / United States FME (the United States)

Runways
Direction	Length		Surface
Direction	ft	m	Surface
10/28	3,000	914	Asphalt

Statistics (2023)
- Aircraft operations (year ending 3/24/2023): 38,124
- Based aircraft: 97
- Source: Federal Aviation Administration

Fort Meade Executive Airport (IATA: FME, ICAO: KFME, FAA LID: FME) is a public airport just south of Fort George G. Meade in Odenton, Anne Arundel County, Maryland. The facility is bordered by Fort Meade, the National Security Agency, and the Patuxent Wildlife Research Center. The airport opened in 1999 on the site of a former United States Army Airfield that was closed in 1995. It is operated by the Tipton Airport Authority.

== Facilities and aircraft ==
Fort Meade Executive Airport covers an area of 366 acres (148 ha) and contains one paved runway (10/28) measuring 3,000 ft × 75 ft (914 m × 23 m).

For The 12-month period ending March 24, 2023, the airport had 38,124 aircraft operations, an average of 104 per day: 100% general aviation, <1% air taxi, and <1% military. There are 97 aircraft/rotorcraft based at the airport: 76 single-engine, 7 multi-engine and 14 helicopters.

== History ==
Fort Meade Executive Airport was originally a military airfield. It was constructed in 1960 over a landfill on the outskirts of Fort Meade and was named Fort George G. Meade Army Airfield. The new airfield replaced a smaller airstrip that had been operating since at least 1935 at a site approximately two miles northeast of Tipton's location (what is now the Fort Meade post exchange and commissary complex). In April 1962, the field was renamed Tipton Army Airfield in honor of Colonel William Tipton, a Maryland National Guard officer and decorated veteran of both world wars. Tipton was killed in an aircraft crash in Ohio at the end of World War II.

Public Law 100–526, the Base Alignment and Closure (BRAC) Act of 1988, designated Tipton Army Airfield for closure, and as a result the land on which Tipton is located was transferred to civilian control in 1995. Following a lengthy environmental remediation, which included the removal of unexploded ordnance and hazardous waste, it was opened to civilian traffic. A formal dedication of Tipton Airport was held on October 27, 1999, and on November 1, 1999, the airport held a grand opening.

== Incidents ==
At 2 A.M. on February 17, 1974, Robert K. Preston stole a Huey helicopter from Tipton Field, flew it to Washington, D.C., and hovered for six minutes over the White House before descending on the South Lawn, about 100 yards (91 m) from the West Wing.

== See also ==
- List of airports in Maryland
