= William Dolley Tipton =

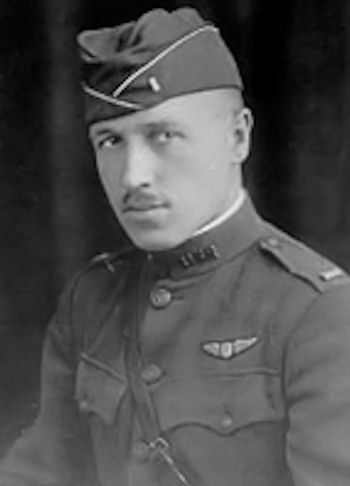
- William Dolley Tipton, 1918
- Born: 11 December 1892; Jarrettsville, Maryland, U.S.
- Died: 12 December 1945 (aged 53); Adena, Ohio, U.S.
- Burial place: Section 10, Site 10604, Arlington National Cemetery
- Military career
- Allegiance: United States
- Branch: Royal Air Force (United Kingdom); Air Service, United States Army
- Rank: Lieutenant
- Units: Royal Air Force: No. 3 Squadron RAF; Air Service, United States Army: 17th Aero Squadron
- Conflicts: World War I World War II
- Awards: Distinguished Flying Cross
- Other work: Commander of 104th Observation Squadron

William Dolley Tipton (sometimes erroneously referred to as William Duncan Tipton) began his military career as a World War I Sopwith Camel pilot. The U.S. Air Force officially credits him with four aerial victories during the war, although other sources claim he had five, and thus was a flying ace. He was one of the founding officers of what would become the Maryland Air National Guard. As a member of the Maryland National Guard, he was mobilized during World War II. He rose to the rank of colonel during the war. He died on December 12, 1945, in an aircraft accident. Tipton Airport (formerly Tipton Army Airfield) in Anne Arundel County, Maryland, is named in his honor.

== World War I ==
Tipton joined the U.S. Army Air Service on June 5, 1917, as a flying cadet. He was commissioned on March 9, 1918, and was one of the American pilots forwarded to the Royal Flying Corps for advanced training and combat seasoning.

According to some sources, he won his first two air battles in May 1918, while attached to the British No. 3 Squadron. Rejoining the American 17th Aero Squadron on 21 June, he became a balloon buster on 22 August 1918. Four days later, he destroyed two Fokker D.VII in a late afternoon dogfight, but was also wounded and shot down, most probably by Leutnant Hermann Frommherz. Tipton spent the rest of the war as a prisoner of the Germans. He was awarded the British Distinguished Flying Cross during the war

The U.S. Air Force aerial victory credit register does not include the two alleged victories from May. Instead, it includes a single aerial victory on 7 June 1918. The register does corroborate Tipton's last three victories. Tipton flew his first combat missions in May 1918, so it is possible that he did indeed score the two victories the U.S. Air Force does not credit to him. It is also possible (speculation) that these victories were attributed to the wrong "William D. Tipton," especially given that the sources that credit him with these victories frequently misidentify him as "William Duncan Tipton."

== Interwar Years ==
Tipton was one of the founding members of the 104th Observation Squadron, the original unit of the Maryland Air National Guard (MDANG). At the time the unit was organized in 1921, Tipton was a captain and held the position of flight leader, and from 1924 to 1929, he served as the squadron commander. He later rose to the position of Division Air Officer for the 29th Infantry Division, of which the 104th was a part.

During the interwar period, Tipton played an influential role in the development of aviation in Maryland. He worked as the "staff aviator" for the Baltimore Sun newspaper, where he not only wrote a column devoted to aviation, but used an aircraft to gather news. This is believed to be the first time a newspaper employed an aircraft for newsgathering purposes. In addition, he served on the state aviation commission from 1921 to 1928, and leased and ran the Curtiss-Wright aviation facility northwest of Baltimore in the 1930s and 40s.

== World War II ==
By the time the Maryland National Guard was mobilized for World War II, Tipton had risen to the rank of lieutenant colonel. During the war, he was promoted to the rank of full colonel and served in a number of assignments. He commanded Galveston Army Airfield, Texas, from November 1943 to April 1944. He was a senior member of the 72nd Fighter Wing until taking command of Peterson Field, Colorado, on June 10, 1944. In March 1945, he was transferred to Dalhart Army Airfield, Texas. His final assignment was command of the 204th Army Air Force Base Unit at Briggs Field, Texas.

He was killed on December 12, 1945, when the P-47N he was piloting crashed near Adena, Ohio, as he was flying home to be released from active duty.

== Honors ==
In 1962, Tipton Army Air Field at Fort Meade, Maryland, was named in his honor at the suggestion of Major General Milton Reckord, then-Adjutant General of Maryland. The airfield was transferred to civilian control in 1995 and following a period of environmental remediation, became active as Tipton Airport in Anne Arundel County, Maryland.

== See also ==
- List of World War I flying aces from the United States

== Bibliography ==
- Above the Trenches: a Complete Record of the Fighter Aces and Units of the British Empire Air Forces 1915-1920. Christopher F. Shores, Norman L. R. Franks, Russell Guest. Grub Street, 1990. ISBN 0-948817-19-4, ISBN 978-0-948817-19-9.
- American Aces of World War I. Norman Franks, Harry Dempsey. Osprey Publishing, 2001. ISBN 1-84176-375-6, ISBN 978-1-84176-375-0.
- The Maryland Air National Guard: An Operational and Organizational History, 1921-2021. Wayde Minami, Sword Tree Press, 2024. ISBN 979-8-9912059-0-0.
