= Baltimore Municipal Airport =

Airport near Baltimore, Maryland, US

Coordinates: 39°14′50.86″N 76°31′46.81″W

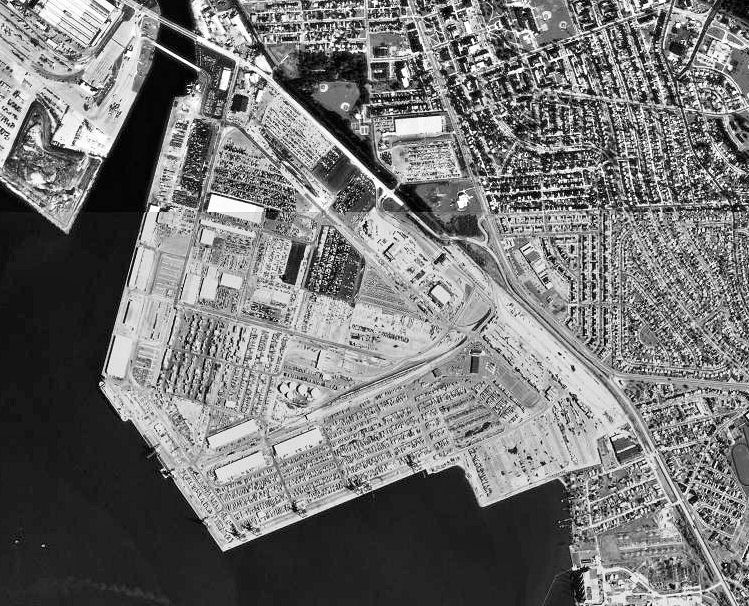
Aerial view of the former Baltimore Municipal Airport in April 1994

Location of Baltimore Municipal Airport, Maryland

Baltimore Municipal Airport ("Harbor Field") is a former airport and United States Air Force airfield about 6 miles southeast of Baltimore, Maryland, on an artificial peninsula. Construction began in 1929 with a seaplane base and was completed in 1941. It closed on 30 December 1960. The western half of the airport was within the city of Baltimore, whereas the eastern half was in Dundalk, in Baltimore County.

Today the former airfield is the site of the Dundalk Marine Terminal, a multi-use shipping facility of the Port of Baltimore.

== Official names ==
- 1929-1941 Baltimore Municipal Airport
- 1942-1945 Baltimore Army Airfield
- 1946-1950 Baltimore Municipal Airport
- 1950-1960 Harbor Field
- 1960–present Dundalk Marine Terminal

== History ==
=== Colonial-era ===
The grounds of the former "Baltimore Municipal Airport" along the shores of the lower Colgate Creek, was the original location of the first church building for St. Paul's Parish of the old Church of England, the established state church then of the colonial-era Province of Maryland, and one of the original 30 parishes designated for the Colony and the one for the newly established in Baltimore County, Maryland, in 1692. It is the oldest church in both Baltimore County and the city of Baltimore.

After 1706, when an official tobacco port had been established at Baltimore Town along Whetstone Point on the Northwest Branch of the River by authority of the Maryland General Assembly for shipping and imports, there was enough that local citizens petitioned the legislature to lay out a town which was authorized in 1729 and followed the next year by an official "Original Survey" laying out lots of land. As the official Anglican Church for the county, it was decided to move the Parish to the new Baltimore Town, so Lot#19 was purchased from Charles Carroll of Annapolis in 1730 and construction of a new brick building (the first in Baltimore Town) was begun at the southeast corner of Forest (later North Charles Street) and St. Paul's Lane (later East Saratoga Street) on a cliff overlooking a bend to the east in the old Jones Falls stream.

=== 20th century ===
Construction of "Baltimore Municipal Airport" began in 1929 under authority and exertions of the municipal government of the City of Baltimore. The airport was planned as a replacement for the smaller Logan Field of the 1920s, which was next to the planned site of the new airport. It was built on an artificial peninsula built from dredged harbor silt alongside the old Colgate Creek on the "Patapsco Neck" peninsula, which ends and juts out into the Chesapeake Bay between the Patapsco River to the south and Back River in the north at Sparrows Point and North Point. Lower Colgate Creek flowed into the Patapsco River and is today the site of the Dundalk Marine Terminal facility of the Helen Delich Bentley Port of Baltimore.

A seaplane facility was opened by Pan American Airlines in 1932, and by 1937 Imperial Airlines began operation out of the airport (seaplane use subsequently declined, and by the end of the 1940s the seaplane facilities had fallen into disuse). Various airlines and "Pan Am" seaplanes (known as "Clippers") used the facility until World War II. Problems with the harbor silt led to lengthy delays and the facilities for land-based aircraft weren't ready for use until 1941.

Civil traffic was suspended in 1942, when the United States Army Air Corps took over the airfield. The Army Air Corps used "Baltimore Army Airfield" as a I Fighter Command training airfield. Units assigned to the airfield were the 324th Fighter Group (6 July-28 October 1942); 353rd Fighter Group (26 October 1942 – 27 May 1943), and the 358th Fighter Group (28 April-28 May 1943). Beginning in 1943, it was transferred to the Air Technical Service Command as a repair and maintenance sub-depot for the Middletown Air Depot, located near Harrisburg, Pennsylvania.

In 1942, British Prime Minister Winston Churchill departed from Baltimore Municipal Airport on a British Overseas Airways Company (BOAC) flight, which is today British Airways", after visiting President Franklin D. Roosevelt in what was at first, a secret trip to the White House in Washington, D.C. during the Christmas season for Allied consultations shortly after the U.S. entered World War II after the Imperial Japanese Navy Air Service launched a surprise Attack on Pearl Harbor in Pearl Harbor, Hawaii, on December 7, 1941, and later on other U.S. air and naval bases in the Philippines. Churchill later met with reporters, and addressed an unprecedented joint session of the United States Congress at the U.S. Capitol. BOAC continued to use Harbor Field as its main U.S. Operating Base during the war. BOAC "flying boat" service to Baltimore Municipal Airport ended in 1948.

Civil airline service returned to "Baltimore Municipal Airport" in 1946. The airport's runways were not long and were limited to smaller planes. When Friendship International Airport (later Baltimore-Washington International Airport) opened in 1950, near Linthicum in suburban northern Anne Arundel County, airlines almost immediately moved to the new airport, which would later handle transcontinental jetliners. "Baltimore Municipal Airport" was officially renamed "Harbor Field" in 1950. During the 1950s "Baltimore Harbor Field" continued to serve private pilots and business aviation.

It was also used as a Maryland Air National Guard (MDANG) base after the war. Beginning in 1946, the MDANG based its 104th Fighter Squadron at the airport. The squadron was originally equipped with piston-powered P-47 Thunderbolt aircraft, later replaced by F-51 Mustangs, but eventually the unit converted to the jet-powered F-86 Sabre. In 1957, the 104th relocated to the Glenn L. Martin Company Airport, of the former aircraft manufacturer Glenn L. Martin Company further to the east along Eastern Avenue in Middle River whose longer runways was necessary to support jet operations. In addition, the Maryland Air National Guard's 135th Air Commando Group was based at Harbor Field from 1955 until 1960, when it too relocated to the Martin Company Airport. That unit flew twin-engine C-46 Commando and SA-16 Albatross aircraft.

In 1958, the airport was purchased by the recently constituted, old Maryland Port Authority of the State of Maryland for conversion into a marine terminal for port and maritime business and shipping, ending the use of the facility as an airport. The airfield was officially closed on 30 December 1960, following the departure of the last Air National Guard unit.

Construction throughout the 1960s removed the runways and other airport structures, and by 1971 almost all physical evidence of the former city airport were gone. A 1990 historic site survey reported on four major structures from the "Airport Era" which were still extant: the old 1930s "Art Deco"-style Pan American terminal, the Air Station, Hangar #1, and the Air Guard Building.

=== 21st century ===
The Maryland Historical Trust subsequently earlier found these buildings to be eligible for the National Register of Historic Places, based on their innovative design features and their association with local transportation history. In 2005, the former control tower building, which had become derelict, was torn down. By April 2013, Frederick N. Rasmussen, an historical and nostalgia newspaper columnist at The Baltimore Sun, reported that the iconic Pan Am Terminal that he visited five years earlier had been razed, and a substantial piece of Maryland's aviation history was lost.

== See also ==
- Maryland World War II Army Airfields
- Baltimore Municipal Airport from Enoch Pratt Free Library at Digital Maryland
