= Maryland Air National Guard =

- Maryland Air National Guard emblem
- Active: June 29, 1921 – present
- Country: United States
- Allegiance: Maryland
- Branch: Air National Guard
- Type: State militia, military reserve force
- Role: "To meet state and federal mission responsibilities."
- Part of: Maryland National Guard; United States National Guard Bureau
- Garrison/HQ: Maryland Air National Guard, Martin State Air National Guard Base, Middle River, MD 21220

Commanders
- Civilian leadership: President Donald Trump (Commander-in-Chief); Troy Meink (Secretary of the Air Force); Governor Wes Moore (Governor of the State of Maryland)
- State military leadership: Brigadier General Drew E. Dougherty

Insignia
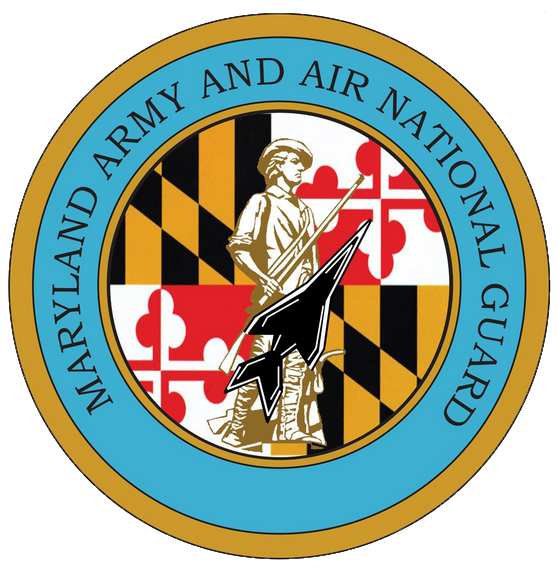
- Maryland Army and Air National Guard logo

The Maryland Air National Guard (MD ANG) is the aerial militia of the U.S. state of Maryland, and a reserve component of the United States Air Force. It is, along with the Maryland Army National Guard, an element of the Maryland National Guard.

As state militia units, the units in the Maryland Air National Guard are not actively in the United States Air Force chain of command until federalized. They are under the jurisdiction of the governor of Maryland through the office of the Maryland Adjutant General unless they are federalized by order of the president of the United States. The Maryland Air National Guard is headquartered at Martin State Air National Guard Base in Middle River, Maryland, and its commander is Brigadier General Drew Dougherty.

== Overview ==
Under the "Total Force" concept, Maryland Air National Guard units are considered to be Air Reserve Components (ARC) of the United States Air Force (USAF). Maryland ANG units are trained and equipped by the Air Force and are operationally gained by a major command of the USAF if federalized. In addition, the Maryland Air National Guard forces are assigned to Air Expeditionary Forces and are subject to deployment tasking orders along with their active duty and Air Force Reserve counterparts in their assigned cycle deployment window.

Along with their federal reserve obligations, as state militia units the elements of the Maryland ANG are subject to being activated by order of the governor to provide protection of life and property, and preserve peace, order and public safety. State missions include disaster relief in times of earthquakes, hurricanes, floods and forest fires, search and rescue, protection of vital public services, and support to civil defense.

== Components ==
The Maryland Air National Guard consists of the following major components:

- Headquarters, Maryland Air National Guard

Stationed at: Warfield Air National Guard Base, Middle River

- 175th Wing

Established 1 October 1962 as the 175th Tactical Fighter Group
Stationed at: Warfield Air National Guard Base, Middle River
The 175th Wing is a composite unit, with a fighter operations group and a cyberspace operations group. The 175 WG has two active USAF gaining commands: the Air Combat Command for its fighter aircraft and for its cyber units, and United States Air Forces in Europe for its 235th Civil Engineer Flight.

== History ==
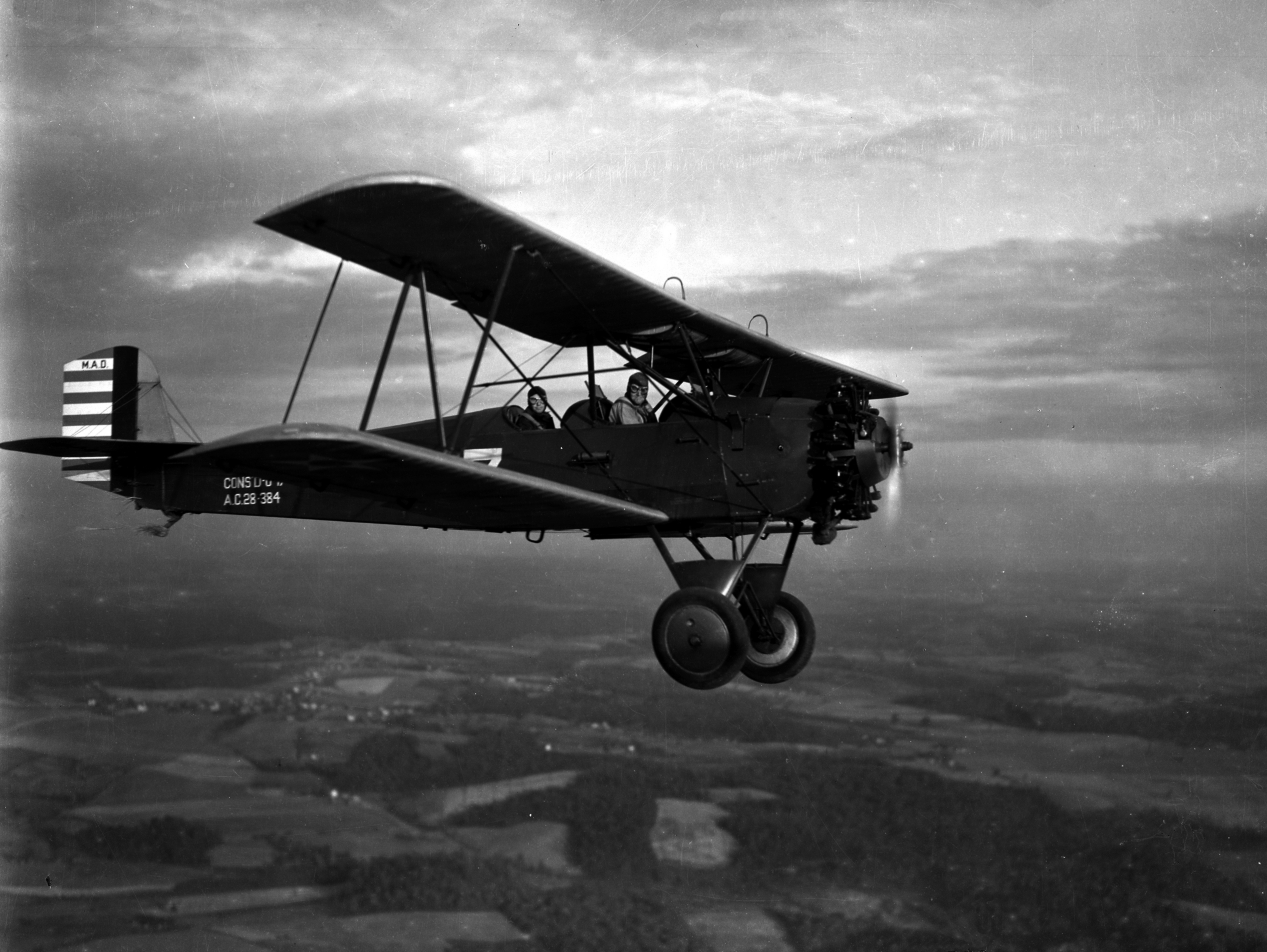
A Consolidated O-17 of the 104th Observation Squadron during a mission on 11 September 1931

The Maryland Air National Guard traces its origins to 29 June 1921. On that date the 104th Observation Squadron was federally recognized in Baltimore. It became the first post-World War I National Guard unit to be equipped with its own aircraft, 13 Curtiss JN-4 Jennies, which it flew until 1923. The unit was based at Logan Field in Baltimore.

The 104th, along with the 104th Photo Section, 164th Air Intelligence Section, and the Medical Detachment Air Service, was initially assigned as a component of 29th Division Air Service (later redesignated 29th Division Aviation), division aviation for the 29th Infantry Division. Their annual summer training encampments were at Langley Field, Virginia (until 1931) and Detrick Field, Maryland (1931–41). (Detrick Field, now Fort Detrick, was named for the squadron's flight surgeon, Captain Frederick Detrick. In addition to Jennies, the 104th flew a variety of other aircraft during the interwar period, including the TW-3, PT-1, O-2, O-11, O-17, and O-38. On Sept. 1, 1941, shortly before the U.S. entry into World War II, the unit was transferred to the 59th Observation Group (now the 59th Medical Wing) as part of a larger reorganization of the U.S. Army Air Forces.

=== World War II ===
Along with the rest of the Maryland National Guard, the 104th was mobilized for federal service on 3 February 1941. The unit was initially based at Logan Field while facilities were upgraded at Detrick Field. During the war, the 104th flew anti-submarine patrols out of Atlantic City, N.J., in O-46s and O-47s and was awarded campaign credit for participation in the Anti-Submarine Campaign. In late 1942, the unit was inactivated and its personnel transferred to the 517th Bombardment Squadron, later redesignated the 12th Anti-Submarine Squadron, at Langley Field, Va. The 12th was a separate unit and did not carry on the lineage of the 104th, which was reactivated as a training unit in Georgia in March 1943 but was not manned by Maryland Guardsmen at the time. In September 1943, the 12th was transferred to California and redesignated the 859th Bombardment Squadron. By this time most of its original National Guard members had been reassigned to other units as individual replacements, although a number of Maryland Guard members remained with the 859th and flew bombing missions over Europe.

=== Cold War ===
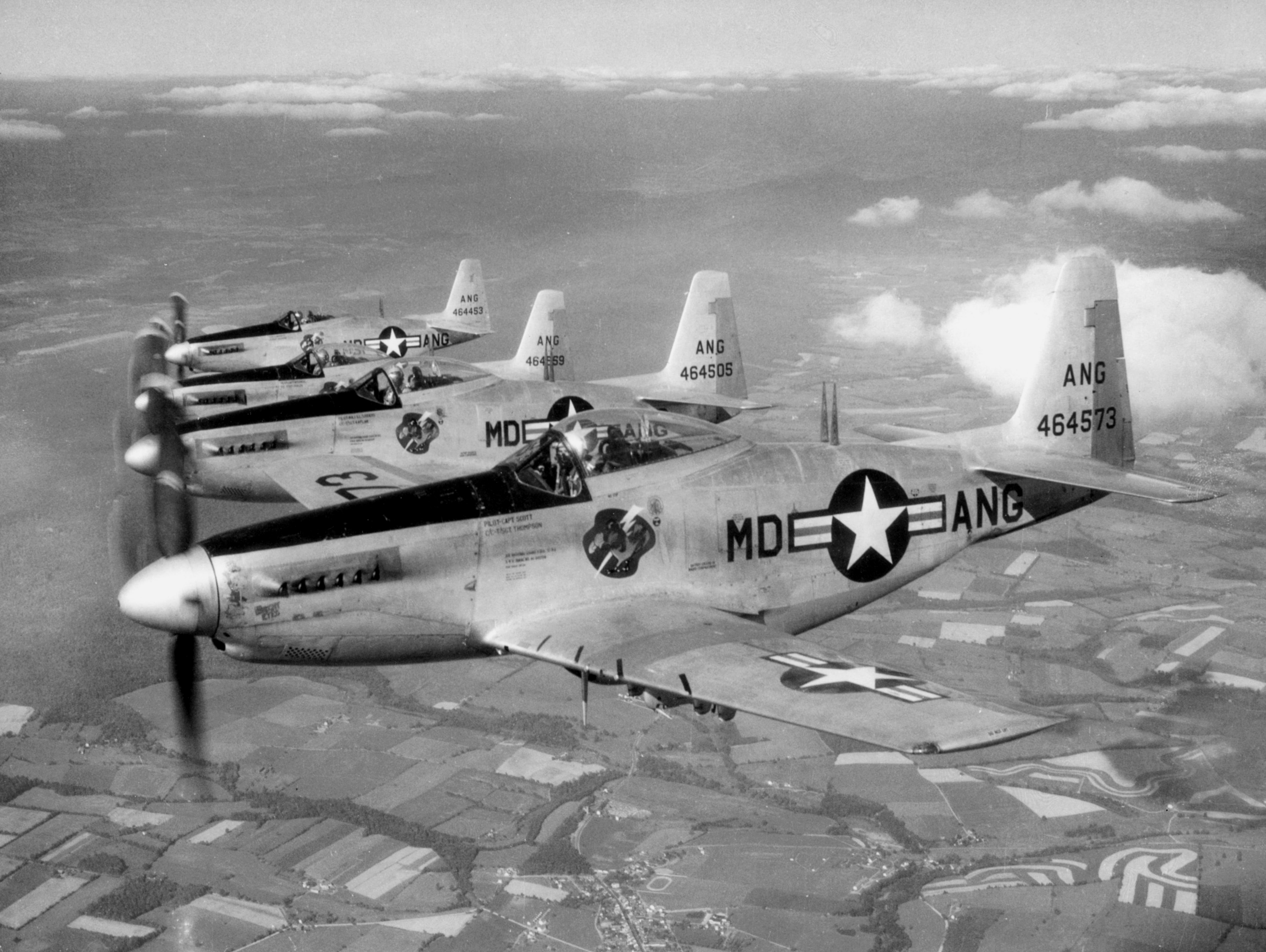
F-51H Mustangs of the Maryland Air National Guard, 1952

In 1946, the 104th was reactivated as the 104th Fighter Squadron at Baltimore Municipal Airport, equipped with P-47 Thunderbolt aircraft, later replaced by P-51 Mustangs. From 1955 to 1958, the unit was organized as a fighter-interceptor squadron and charged with defending the Baltimore-Washington area against possible Soviet bomber attack. The unit soon converted to F-86 Sabre, and in 1957 relocated to the Glenn L. Martin Company Airport, whose longer runway was necessary to support jet operations. The 104th was nominally assigned to the DC National Guard's 113th Fighter Group at the time.

Maryland gained a second flying unit – and its first group-level headquarters – in 1955 when the 135th Air Resupply Group was organized at Harbor Field. The 135th was one of a handful of Air Force special operations units in existence at the time. Equipped with Curtiss C-46 Commando transports and SA-16 Albatross seaplanes, its mission was the covert infiltration, resupply, and extraction of special forces. Redesignated as the 135th Air Commando Group in 1963 and then the 135th Special Operations Group in 1968, it was one of only five such units throughout the Air National Guard. It remained at Harbor Field until 1960, when it too relocated to the Martin Company Airport.

A second group headquarters was added in 1962, when the 175th Tactical Fighter Group was established in October. The 104th Tactical Fighter Squadron, which had heretofore operated as part of the DC National Guard's 113th Fighter Group, became a part of the new group.

The spring of 1968 brought considerable activity, with both the 135th and 175th being called out to help quell rioting in Baltimore following the assassination of Dr. Martin Luther King Jr., and elements of the 175th being federalized and deployed to Cannon Air Force Base, N.M., in response to the USS Pueblo (AGER-2) in Korea. While mobilized, the unit conducted fighter ground attack training for Air Force pilots designated to be forward air controllers. The unit returned to Maryland and demobilized in December.

The Maryland Air National Guard endured multiple changes in designation and equipment during the 1970s. The 135th Special Operations Group switched first to a tactical air support role, where it flew forward air controller missions with O-2A Skymasters, then in 1977, assumed a new mission and was redesignated the 135th Tactical Airlift Group and equipped with the de Havilland C-7A Caribou. In 1980, the unit converted to the C-130 Hercules aircraft.

The 175th Tactical Fighter Group also changed aircraft to meet the evolving needs of the Air Force. In 1970, the 175th turned in its F-86s and received A-37 Dragonflies in their place. Nine years later, in 1979, the unit was re-equipped with brand new A-10 Thunderbolt II aircraft from the Fairchild factory in Hagerstown, Maryland.

The military facilities at Martin State Airport were formally renamed the Warfield Air National Guard Base in honor of Maj Gen (Ret) Edwin Warfield III, former Adjutant General of Maryland, in 1982 and the base has since been known as Warfield Air National Guard Base within the state, although the U.S. Air Force does not officially recognize that name due to a policy that military facilities at dual-use airfields must use the same name as the civilian airport. The civilian portion of the field had been obtained by the state and renamed Martin State Airport in 1975.

=== Gulf War and Peacekeeping ===
Despite the end of the Cold War, the Maryland Air National Guard remained heavily involved in operations around the world through the remainder of the century. During the build-up to the 1991 Persian Gulf War, a number of unit personnel were mobilized to fill support roles. Three Maryland C-130s were mobilized and deployed to Germany to “backfill” for aircraft being sent into the combat theater, while the unit's Mobile Aerial Port Flight was called up and sent to Dover Air Force Base, Del. The same year, the 175th won Gunsmoke, the U.S. Air Force Worldwide Gunnery Competition, earning recognition as the best fighter unit in the Air Force.

The 135th participated in humanitarian relief efforts in Somalia, peacekeeping and humanitarian relief in Bosnia, the U.S. intervention in Haiti, and enforcement of U.N. sanctions against Iraq during the 1990s. A-10s from the 175th were likewise kept busy patrolling the skies over Bosnia-Herzegovina as a part of the U.N./NATO task force and enforcing the “no-fly” zone over southern Iraq, where it was called upon to fly retaliatory strikes against Iraqi targets.

On 15 June 1996, the 135th was inactivated and the 175th Fighter Group was reorganized and redesignated as the 175th Wing. The two groups' subordinate squadrons were reassigned within the new wing. The 175th Wing, which carries on the lineage and honors of the 175th Fighter Group, is a composite organization with an Air Combat Command-gained fighter unit and a U.S. Air Forces in Europe-gained civil engineer flight, and a cyberspace warfare group.

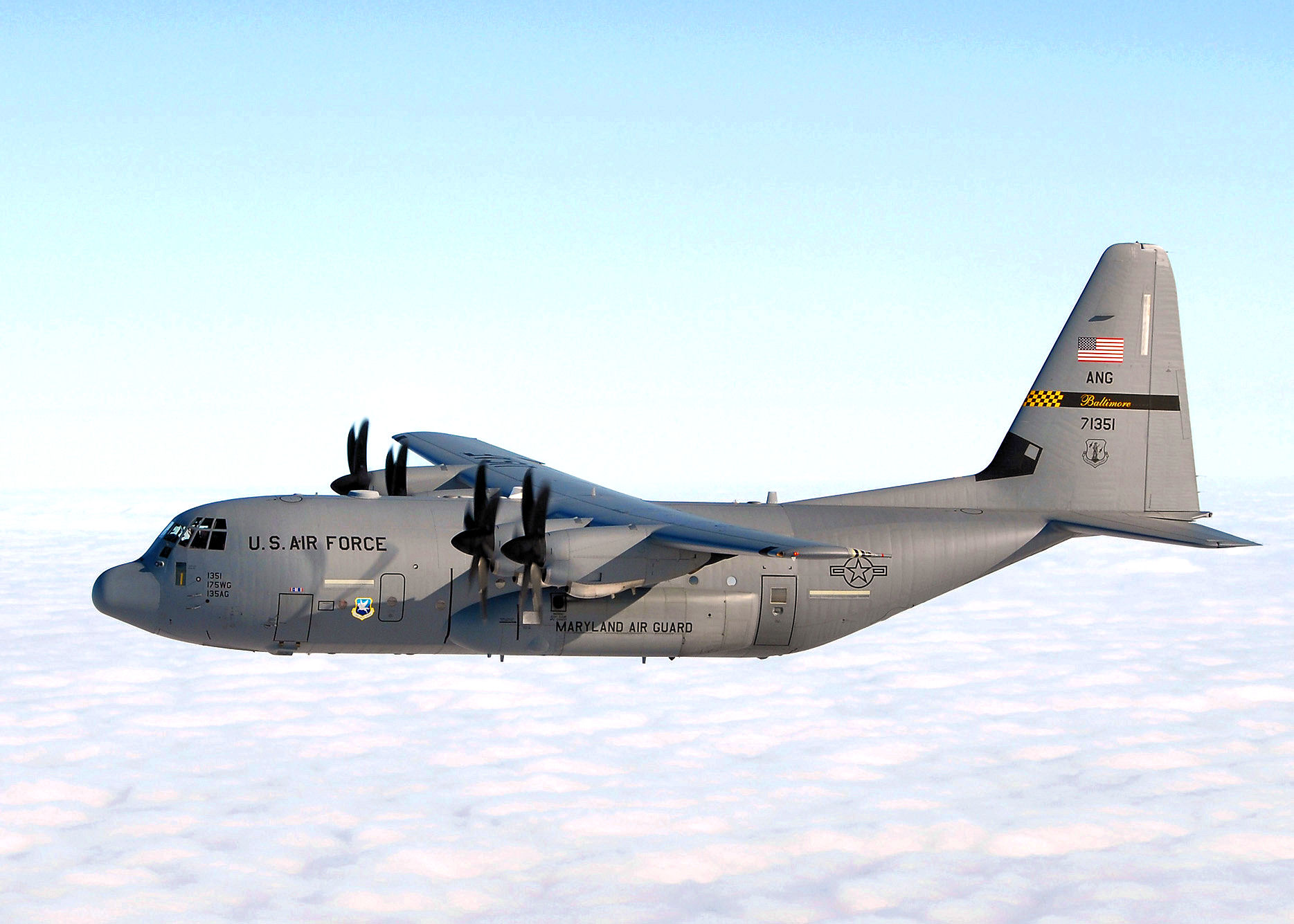
A C-130 Hercules of the 175th Wing, 2011

The wing has been deeply involved in fielding the latest Air Force aircraft. In 1999, it dedicated its first C-130J, the latest and most advanced version of the venerable transport. The 135th played a major role in the operational test and evaluation of the aircraft, procedures development and evaluation, and was the first fully equipped C-130J unit in the U.S. Air Force. In 2011, the unit again transitioned aircraft, this time to the new C-27J Spartan.

The wing was also selected as the lead unit to convert to the new A-10C – the first A-10 aircraft in the U.S. Air Force to be modified for precision engagement. Beginning in 2006, wing personnel were deeply involved in the test and evaluation process and in September 2007, the 104th Fighter Squadron became the first unit to take the A-10C into combat, when it deployed to Iraq. The Maryland Air National Guard retired its last remaining A-10 aircraft on September 23, 2025, leaving Maryland as the only state in the nation without aircraft in its Air Guard component.

=== War on terror ===
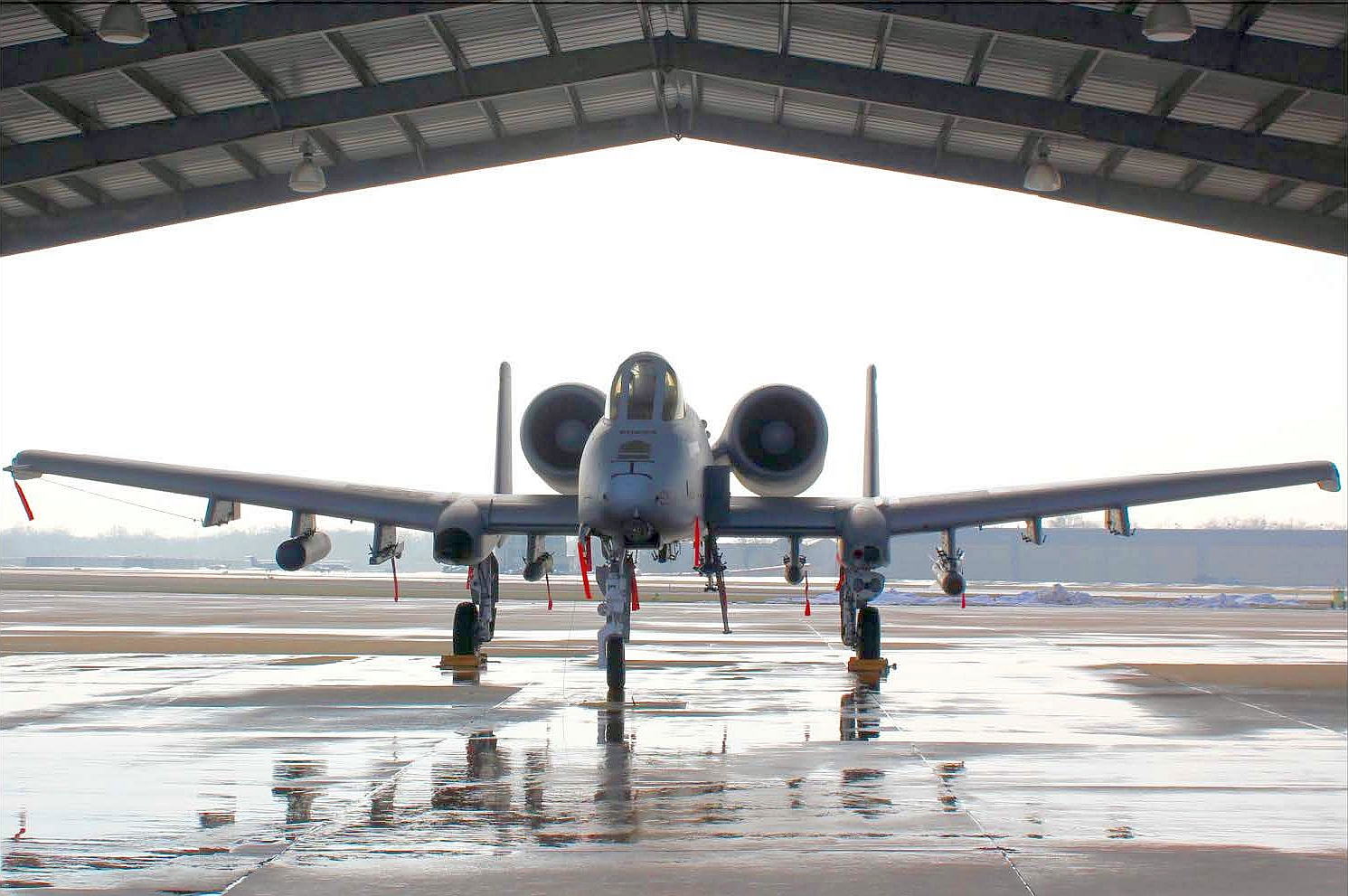
An A-10 of the 104th Fighter Squadron

Since the September 11 attacks, 2001, members of the Maryland Air National Guard have repeatedly volunteered or been mobilized to take part in the Global War on Terrorism. From January to June 2003, the 104th Fighter Squadron was deployed to Bagram Air Base, Afghanistan, where it flew strikes against Taliban and al Qaeda forces and earned the distinction of being the longest-deployed Air National Guard fighter squadron at Bagram. In 2004 multiple members of the 135th APF were mobilized to backfill the 436th APS at Dover AFB DE and later forward deployed to support the 8th EAMS at Al Udeid AB Qatar. From 2004–present, members of the 135th APF (which was later inactivated and replaced by a small air terminal within the 175th Logistics Readiness Squadron) have deployed multiple times to various locations in the CENTCOM AOR in support of ongoing operations there. Elements of the 135th Airlift Group remained almost continuously deployed in support of the war on terror from December 2004 to January 2007, flying combat airlift missions into Iraq, Afghanistan, the Horn of Africa, and elsewhere as part of the 746th Expeditionary Airlift Squadron.

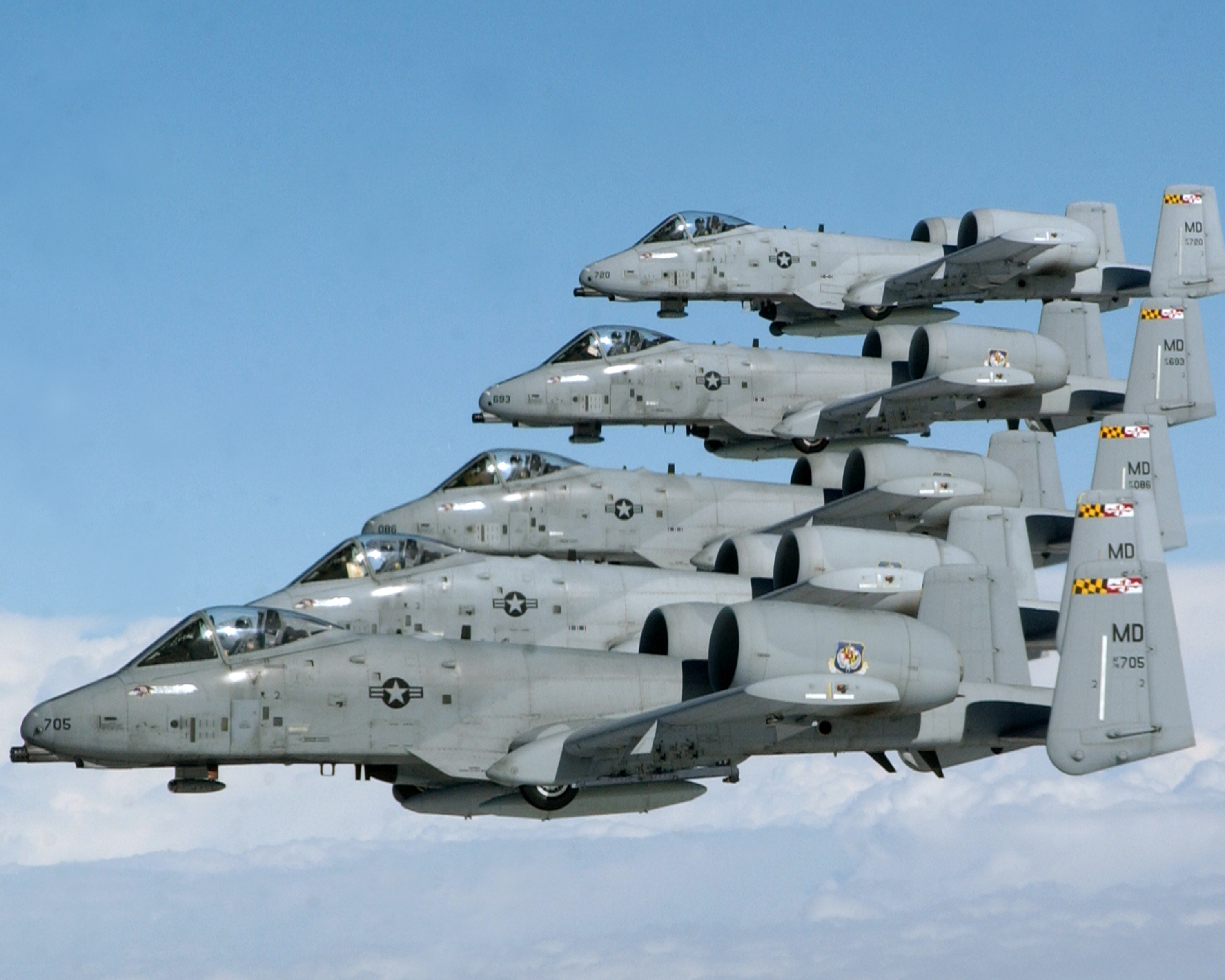
A-10C Thunderbolt II's from the 104th Fighter Squadron, 175th Wing.

In addition to its service overseas, the Maryland Air National Guard has remained fully engaged at home. When Hurricanes Katrina and Rita struck the Gulf Coast in 2005, the Maryland Air National Guard was among the first to respond. The 135th Airlift Group flew 42 relief missions and deployed nearly 200 troops to support recovery and relief efforts in Louisiana and Mississippi. From 2006 to 2008, the Maryland Air Guard deployed a number of members to Arizona in support of the U.S. Border Patrol's efforts to secure the U.S-Mexico border. As a result of the USAF's decision to divest itself of the C-27, the 135th Airlift Group inactivated in 2013, bringing 58 years of service to a close, although its flying squadron continues to operate as a cyber intelligence unit.

== First Sergeant Ribbon ==
First Sergeant Ribbon

The Maryland Air National Guard First Sergeant Ribbon was a state award to honor First Sergeants of the guard after at least three years of exceptional service. It was discontinued in 2010, but those First Sergeants who received the ribbon prior to that date are authorized to continue to display it.

== Notable members ==
- Jack L. Chalker, award-winning science fiction author
- Jack Turnbull, Olympic athlete and lacrosse legend
- Frederick Detrick, MD, flight surgeon and Fort Detrick namesake
- James Alvin Palmer, Baltimore Orioles Hall of Fame Pitcher
- Mark Belanger, Baltimore Orioles shortstop
- Tom Young, novelist

== See also ==
- Maryland Defense Force
- Maryland Wing Civil Air Patrol
