= MDCH =

MDCH may refer to:

- Maryland Digital Cultural Heritage
- Michigan Department of Community Health
- (acyl-carrier-protein) S-malonyltransferase, an enzyme
