= 104th Fighter Squadron =

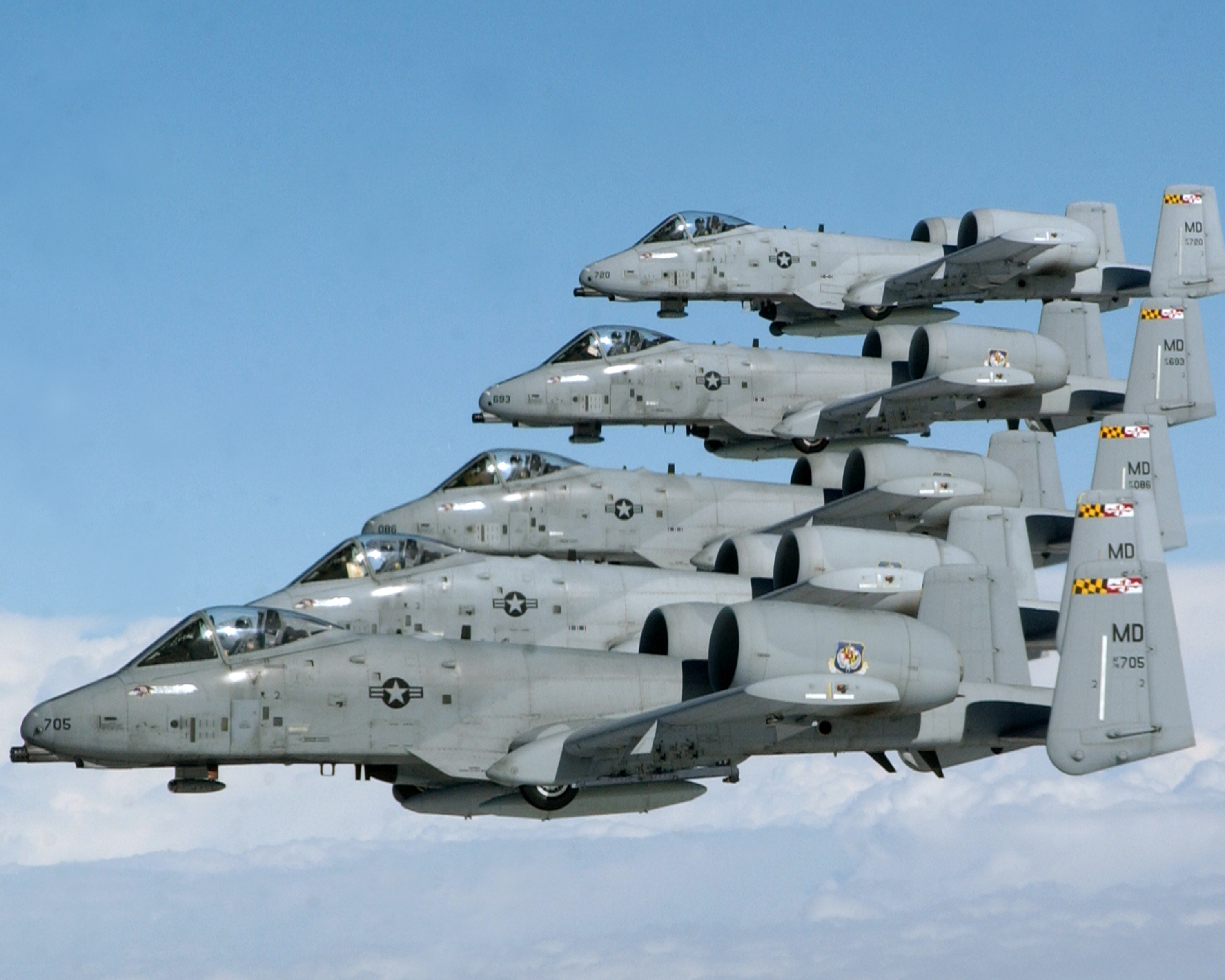
- A-10C Thunderbolt IIs of the 104th FS, 2008
- Active: 29 June 1921 – 18 October 1942; 1 March 1943 – 1 May 1944; 17 August 1946 – 23 September 2025
- Country: United States
- Allegiance: Maryland
- Branch: Air National Guard
- Type: Squadron
- Role: Ground Attack
- Part of: Maryland Air National Guard
- Garrison/HQ: Warfield Air National Guard Base, Middle River, Maryland
- Nickname: Fightin' O's
- Equipment: A-10C Thunderbolt II

Insignia
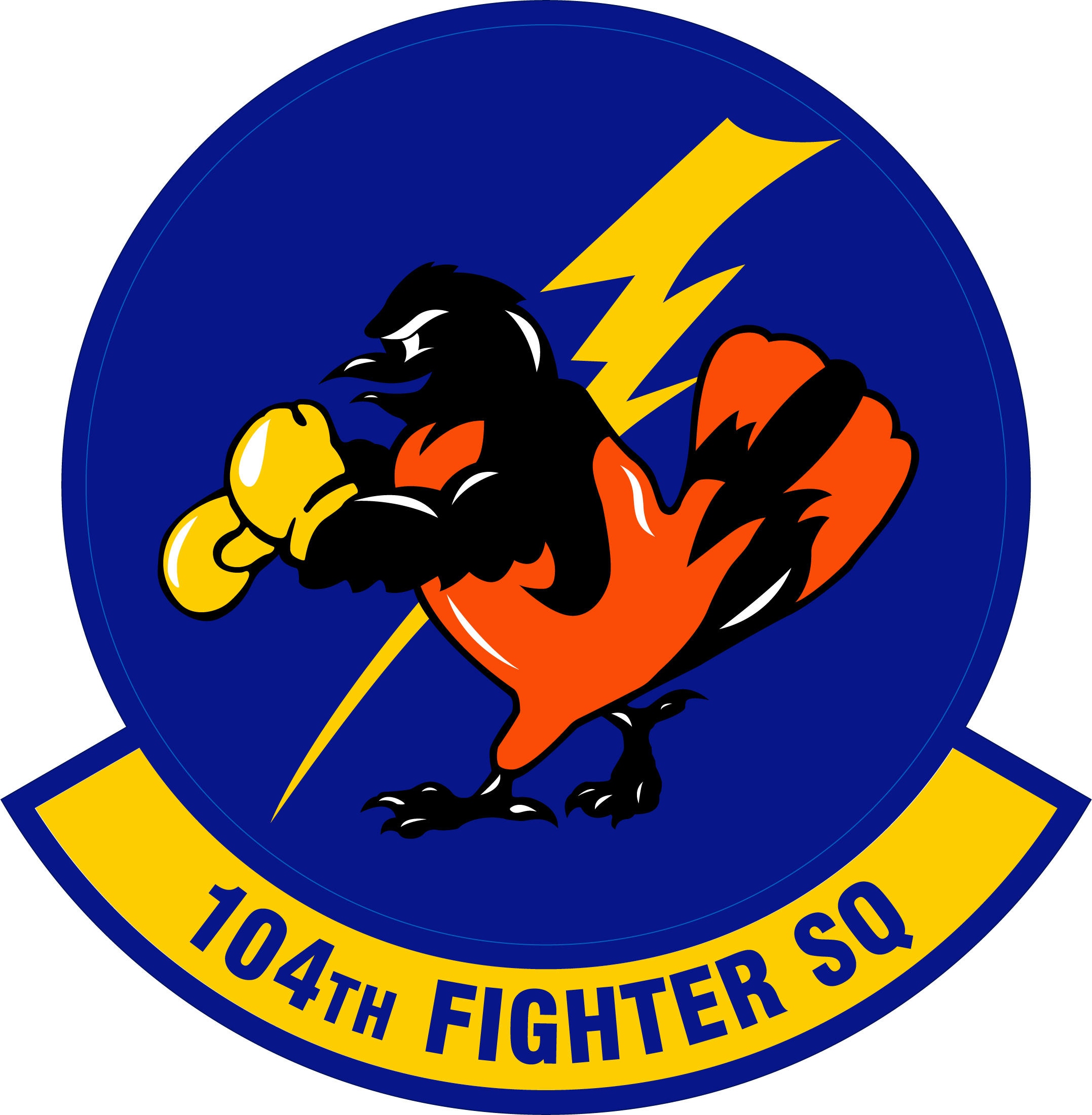
- 104th Fighter Squadron emblem
- Squadron tail code: MD

The 104th Fighter Squadron (104th FS), nicknamed the Fightin' O's, was a unit of the Maryland Air National Guard 175th Wing stationed at Warfield Air National Guard Base, Middle River, Maryland. The 104th was equipped with the Fairchild Republic A-10C Thunderbolt II. It was inactivated in September 2025.

The squadron is a descendant organization of the 104th Squadron (Observation), which was formed on 29 June 1921. It is one of the 29 original National Guard Observation Squadrons of the United States Army National Guard formed before World War II and was the oldest unit of the Maryland Air National Guard.

== Heraldry ==
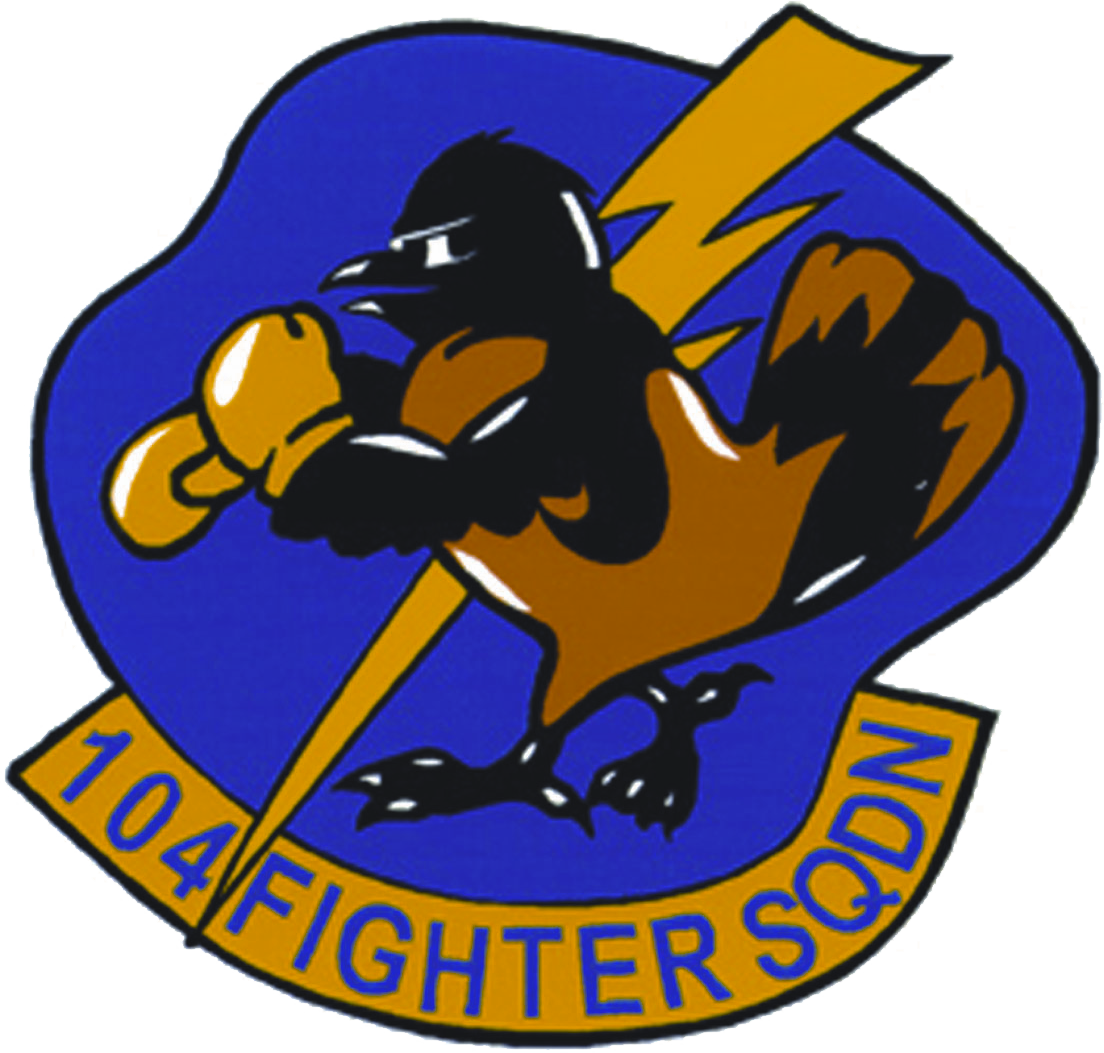
Original design

Revised emblem following the 1990s heraldry review

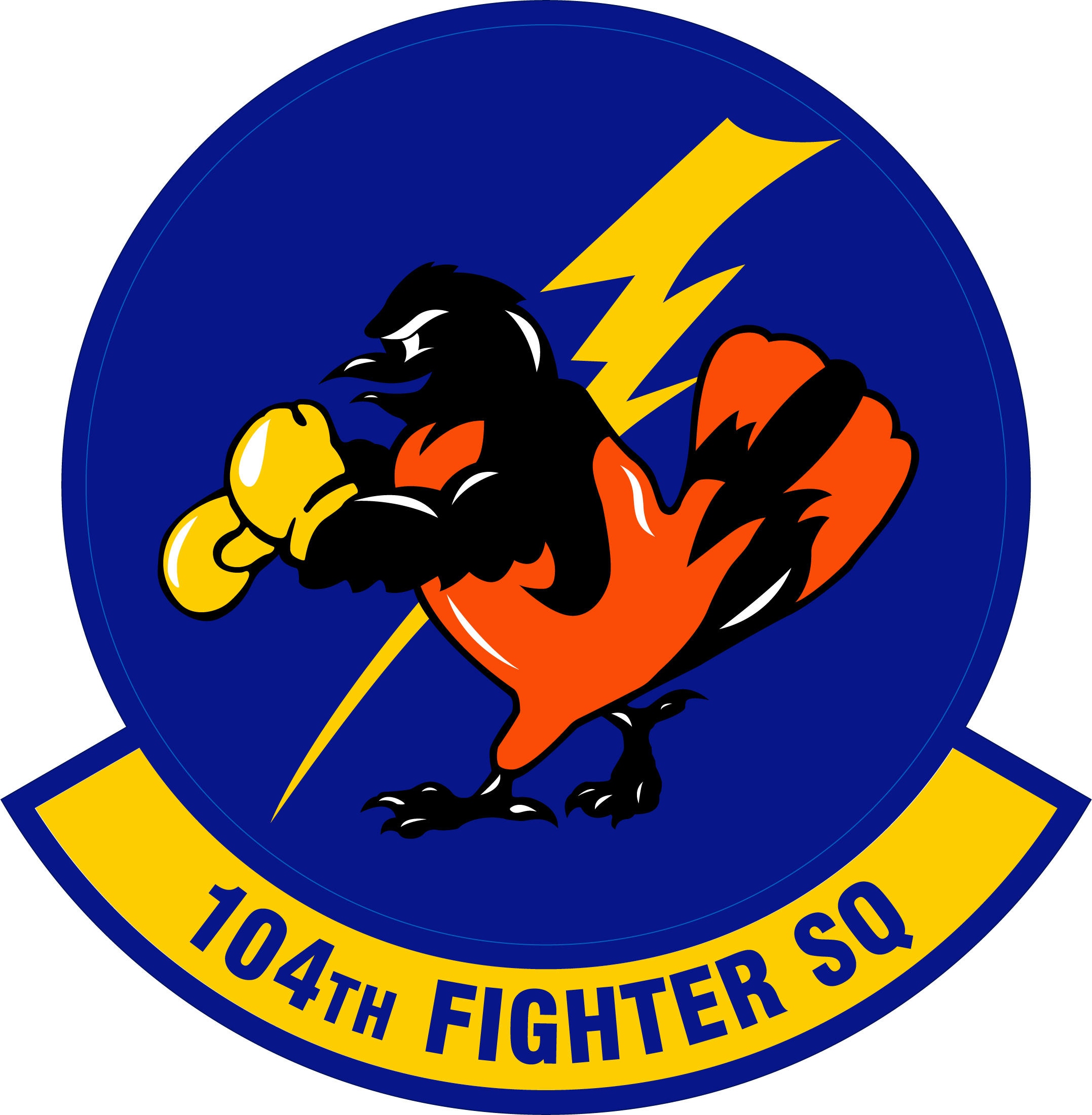
Current official emblem, revised 2020

Unit Emblem: On a disc Azure, a lightning bolt, bend sinister, overall a Baltimore Oriole Proper rampant bearing boxing gloves Or; all within a narrow Blue border. Ultramarine blue and Air Force yellow are the Air Force colors. Blue alludes to the sky, the primary theater of Air Force operations. Yellow refers to the sun and the excellence required of Air Force personnel. The Baltimore Oriole is significant to the unit's location and allegiance to Maryland Air National Guard. The lightning bolt refers to the squadron's use of A-10 Thunderbolt II aircraft. The boxing stance and boxing gloves signify the unit's role in ground attack.

The original insignia was designed by C. Ray Weyrauch Jr. and adopted by the unit 13 April 1947 following a design contest. Although the emblems were almost immediately painted on unit aircraft, it was not approved by the Air Force until 21 September 1953. The emblem was modified without the state's knowledge during the 1990-1994 heraldry review mandated by the Chief of Staff of the Air Force, resulting in numerous changes in color, shape, and design, many of which resulted from production errors in the official drawing. It was again revised on 3 June 2020 to correct 1990s errors.

== History ==
=== Maryland National Guard ===
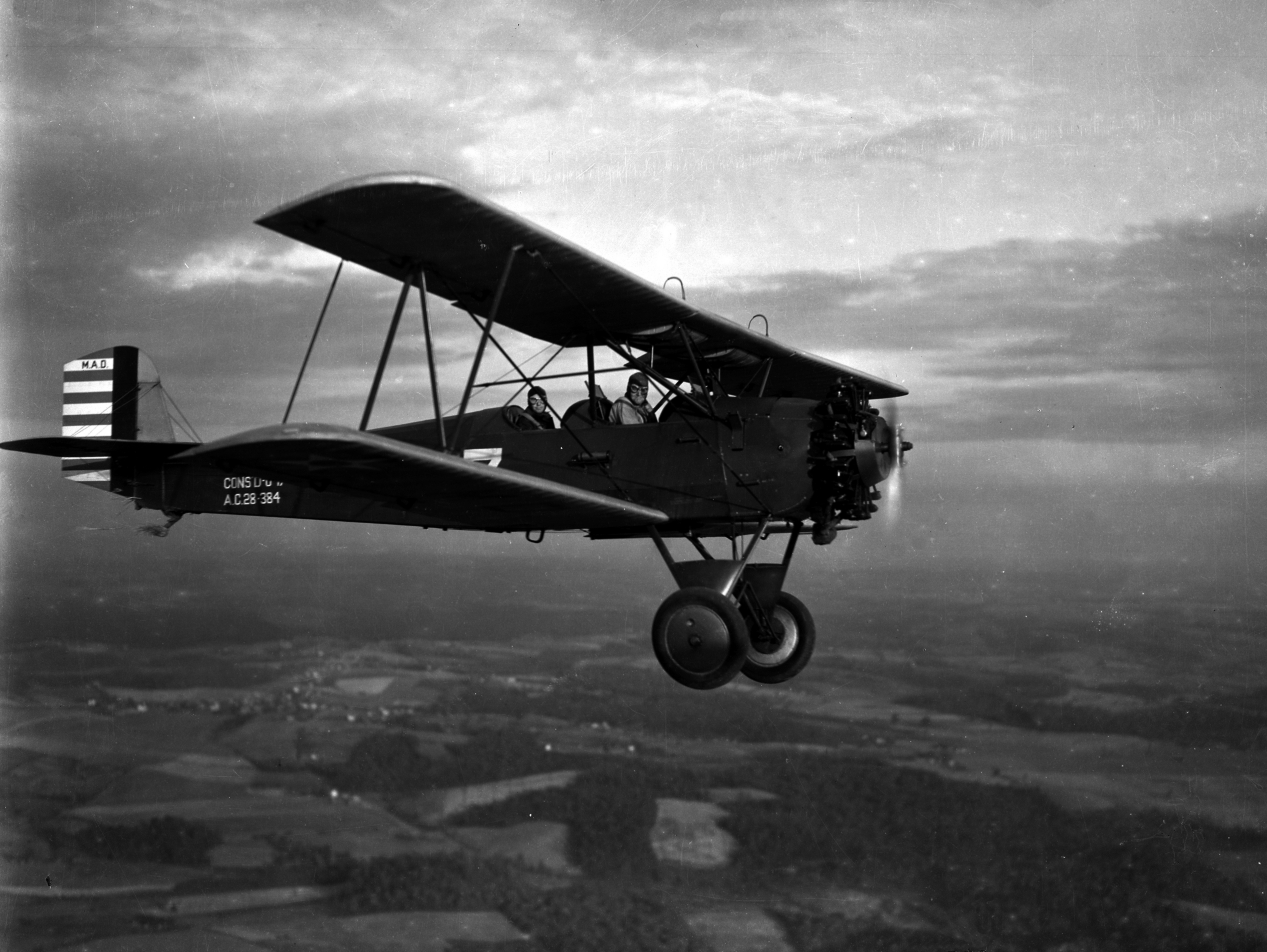
A Consolidated O-17 assigned to the Maryland National Guard's 104th Observation Squadron during a mission on 11 September 1931.

In personnel, if not in official lineage, the 104th Fighter Squadron can trace its origins to 1920 when the Flying Club of Baltimore was organized for former World War I Army Air Service reserve officers of that city. Several members of this club who held reserve commissions became part of the Maryland National Guard in 1921 when Maryland formed one of the nation's first post-war flying units with the creation of the 1st Observation Squadron in Baltimore which received federal recognition on 29 June 1921.

Maryland became the fifth state to have a post-World War I National Guard aviation unit. The 1st Observation Squadron (a state designation) was re-designated the 104th Squadron (Observation) under the federal numbering system on 10 January 1922. At the time, the number 104 was widely used to designate combat support units in the Maryland National Guard, including the 104th Medical Regiment and the 104th Military Police Battalion.

The 104th became the first post-World War I United States National Guard unit to be equipped with its own aircraft, 13 Curtiss JN-4 Jennies, which it flew until 1927. Initially, it was one of four units assigned to 29th Division Aviation, the flying component of the 29th Infantry Division (the other units were the 104th Photo Section, 164th Air Intelligence Section, and Medical Department Detachment, Air Service). The unit operated out of Baltimore's Logan Field. In addition to Jennies, the 104th flew a variety of other aircraft during the interwar period, almost all of them two-seat biplanes.

Conducted annual summer training at various locations to include Langley Field, VA; Shepard Field, Martinsburg, WV; Middletown Air Depot, PA; and at Detrick Airfield, Frederick, MD.

=== World War II ===
At the outset of World War II the 104th became part of the Antisubmarine Patrol used along the East Coast. Initially operating out of the Fort Dix Army Airfield, squadron was moved to the Atlantic City Municipal Airport, as part of the 59th Observation Group using Douglas O-46 and North American O-47 aircraft fling coastal patrol missions. On 18 October 1942, the 104th was inactivated and its personnel and aircraft transferred to the 517th Bombardment Squadron. The 517th was soon moved to Langley Field, Virginia, where it was re-designated as the 12th Antisubmarine Squadron and equipped with B-18 Bolo, and later B-24 Liberator and B-25 Mitchell bombers configured for antisubmarine attack missions.

By this time most of the original Maryland National Guard members had been transferred elsewhere as individual replacements, although a handful were still serving with the unit when it deployed to England in 1943, by which time the 517th Bomb Squadron had been redesignated the 859th Bombardment Squadron, part of the 492d Bombardment Group, Eighth Air Force, a B-24 Liberator group. There is no official lineage however, between the 104th Observation Squadron and the 859th Bombardment Squadron.

Meanwhile, the 104th Observation Squadron was reactivated with the 59th Observation Group. The squadron was redesignated as the 104th Reconnaissance Squadron (Fighter) on 1 March 1943. Equipped with P-39 Airacobras, the squadron was assigned to the 59th Reconnaissance Group, III Fighter Command. Its mission was to train newly graduated pilots from AAF flight training schools to fly single-engine fighter planes as a Replacement Training Unit (RTU). In August 1943, the squadron was redesignated as the 489th Fighter Squadron. However, those changes were administrative in nature, the mission of the squadron remaining the same. The squadron was inactivated and disbanded on 1 May 1944 as part of an Air Force reorganization of its training program. The squadron's training mission subsequently was carried out by "Squadron B", Thomasville Replacement Training Unit. With the end of the war, Thomasville AAF and all of its assigned units were inactivated on 30 September 1945.

=== Maryland Air National Guard ===
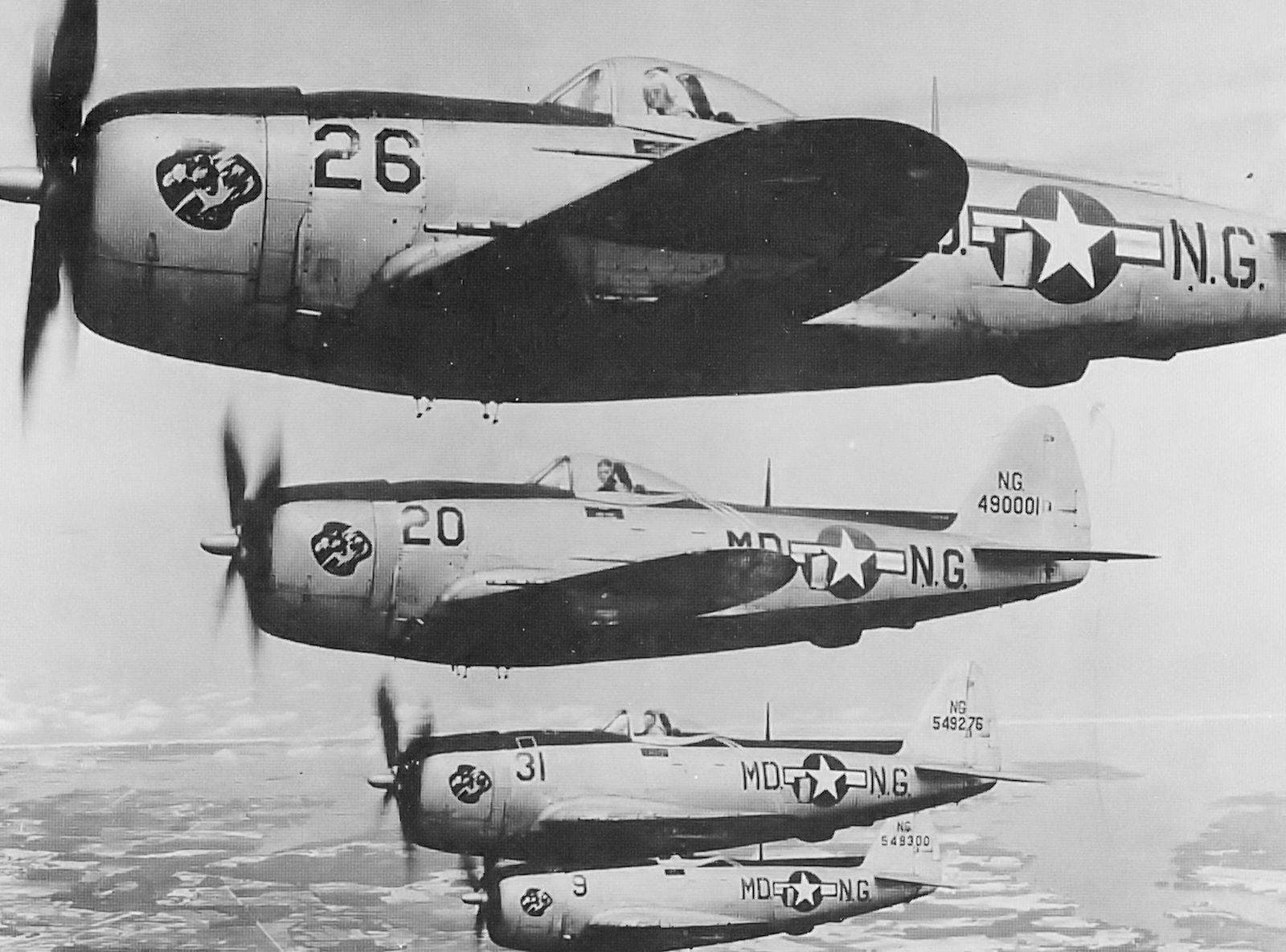
104th FS F-47D Thunderbolts, 1947.

The wartime 489th Fighter Squadron was reconstituted on 21 June 1945 and re-designated as the 104th Fighter Squadron, and was allotted to the Maryland Air National Guard on 24 May 1946. It was organized at Harbor Field, Baltimore, Maryland, and was extended federal recognition on 17 August 1946 by the National Guard Bureau. The 104th Fighter Squadron continued the lineage of the 489th Fighter Squadron and all predecessor units. It was initially equipped with F-47D Thunderbolts.

==== Air Defense Command ====
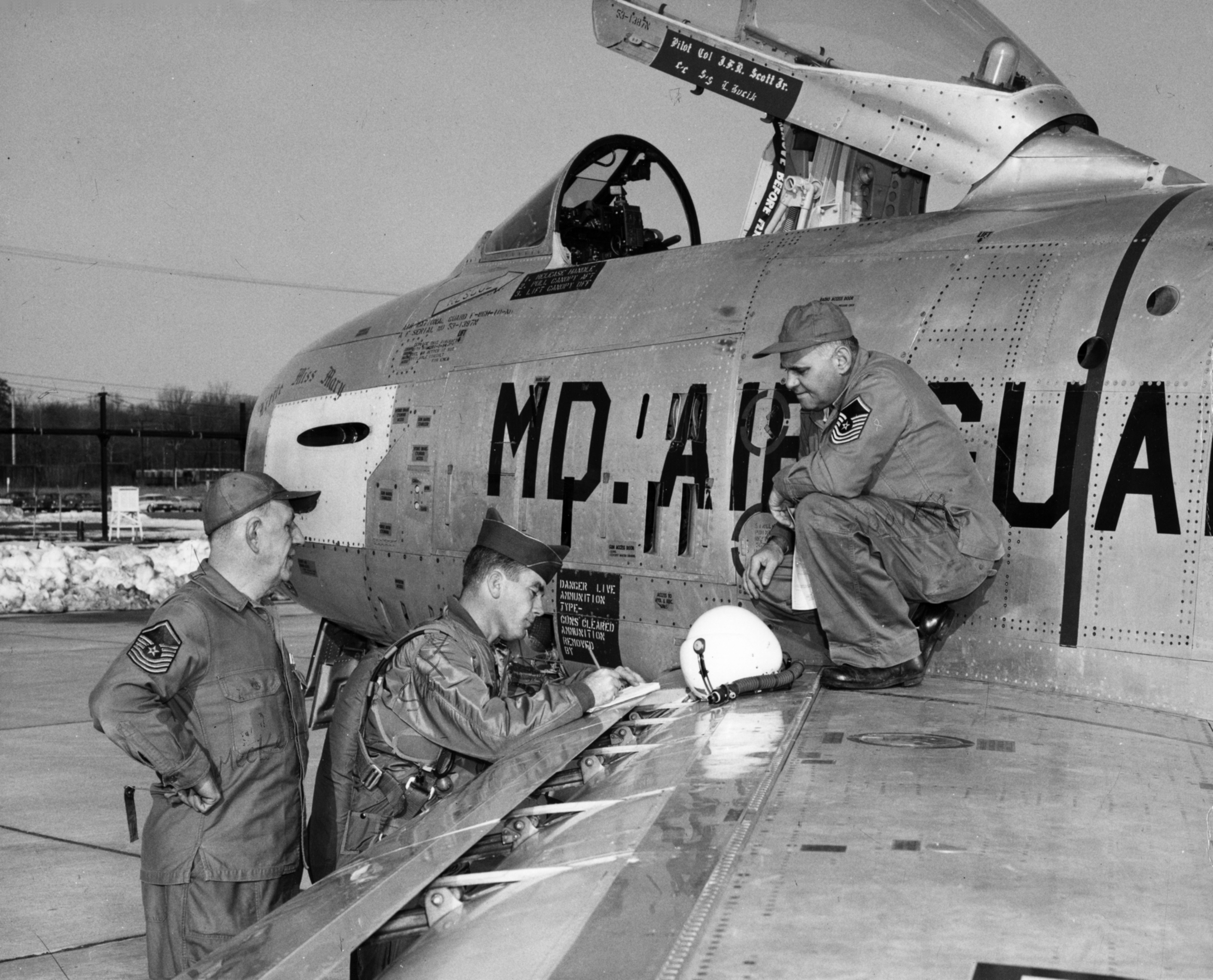
U.S. Air Force Col. John F.R. Scott, a pilot with the Maryland Air National Guard, prepares to board a North American F-86H-10-NH Sabre (s/n 53-1397) of the 104th Tactical Fighter Squadron.

The squadron was one of the first in the Air National Guard and was operationally gained by the Air Defense Command (ADC) First Air Force. As the ANG command and control echelons were formed, the 104th came under the operational control of the DC ANG's 113th Fighter Group, which in turn reported to the PA ANG 53d Fighter Wing, although administrative control was retained by the Maryland ANG.

With the surprise invasion of South Korea on 25 June 1950, and the regular military's complete lack of readiness, most of the Air National Guard was federalized placed on active duty. The Maryland Air National Guard was not federalized, however its aircraft were replaced by very long distance F-51H Mustangs in 1951 to better carry out its air defense mission. While the 113th was mobilized, the squadron reported to the PA ANG's 112th Fighter Group.

By 1955 the Mustangs were at the end of their operational lifetime, and the Air Force issued a directive to ADC to replace all of its interceptor force with Jet Aircraft. As a result, the 104th entered the jet age and received Korean War veteran F-86E Sabres to replace its propeller-driven Mustangs, which were retired. However, Baltimore Harbor Field was unsuitable for jet aircraft due to the length of its runway, and the squadron was forced to temporarily base its jet aircraft at Andrews AFB, and later at Friendship Airport (now BWI Airport), while it looked for a new home. Eventually, the squadron relocated to Glenn L. Martin Company Airport on 1 July 1957 whose longer runway was necessary to support jet operations.

==== Tactical Air Command ====
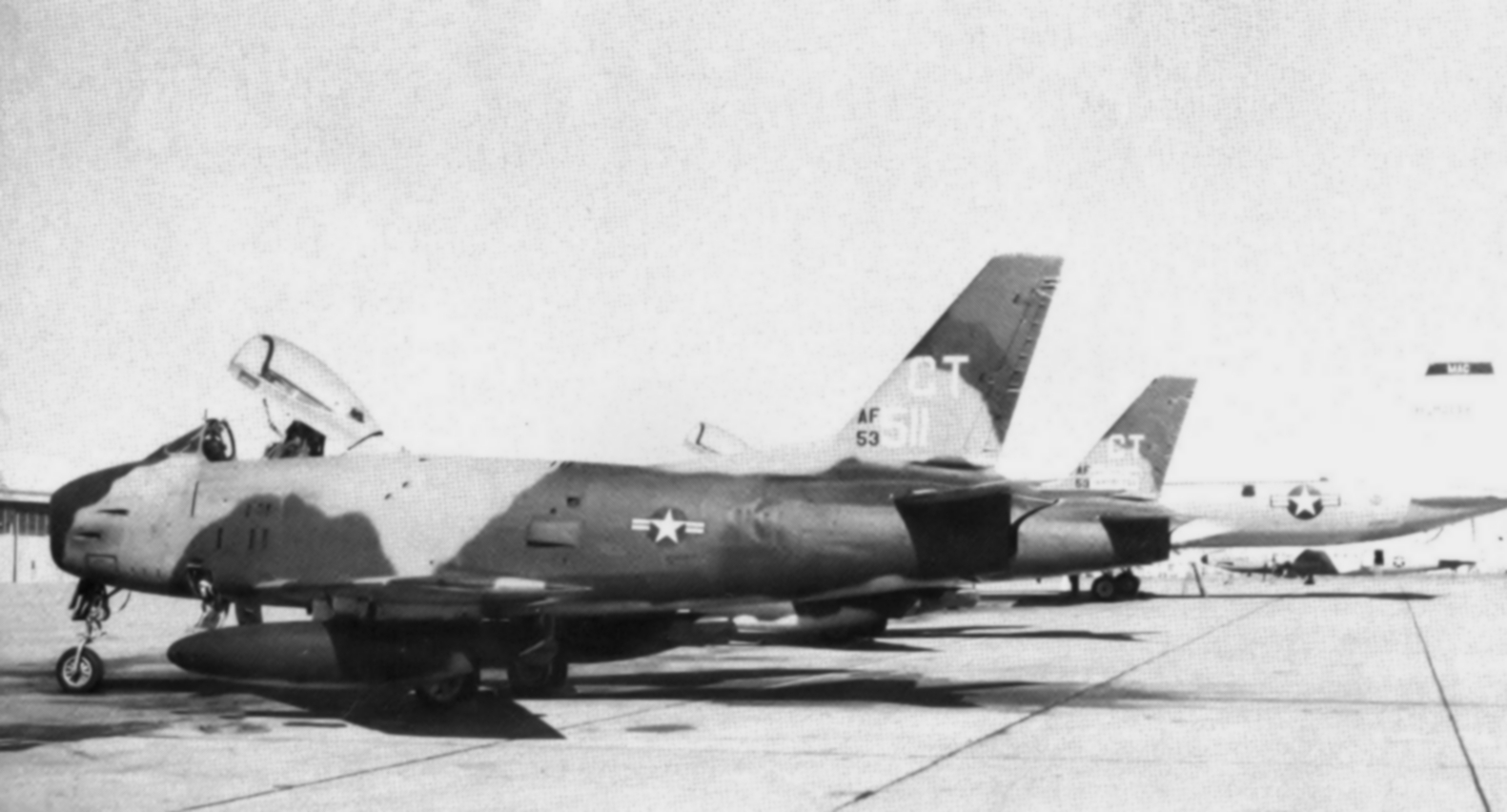
104th FIS North American F-86Hs during 1968 Pueblo Crisis, Cannon AFB, New Mexico painted in Southeast Asian Camouflage Motif. F-86H-10-NH Sabre 53-1511 in foreground, tail of 53-1255 also shown. (53-1511 is now on display at Museum of Aviation, Robins AFB, Georgia)

In 1957 the gaining command of the 104th was transferred to Tactical Air Command (TAC), and the squadron received the post-Korean War North American F-86H Sabre. The F-86H was a fighter-bomber version of the Sabre designed for TAC and was transferred to the ANG by TAC units being upgraded to the F-100 Super Sabre. The air defense of Baltimore and Washington, however, was retained as a secondary mission and the squadron remained under the administrative control of the PA ANG 111th Air Defense Wing, the successor unit to the 53d Fighter Wing. On 10 November 1958 the squadron was re-designated as a Tactical Fighter Squadron. The 104th flew the F-86H for over a decade, remaining in service until well after the United States had committed itself to the Vietnam War. However, no F-86Hs ever went overseas to participate in that conflict, the fighter-bomber mission in Vietnam being flown by F-100s, F-105s and F-4C Phantom IIs.

On 1 October 1962, the 104th was authorized to expand to a group level, and the 175th Tactical Fighter Group was federally recognized and activated by the National Guard Bureau. The 104th TFS becoming the group's flying squadron. Other squadrons assigned into the group were the 175th Headquarters, 175th Material Squadron, 175th Combat Support Squadron, and the 175th USAF Dispensary. With the formation of the 175th TFG, all administration of the unit by the 111th ADW ended.

On 13 May 1968, the 175th Tactical Fighter Group was federalized and ordered to active service. It was transferred to Cannon Air Force Base, New Mexico along with the NY ANG 139th Tactical Fighter Squadron and 174th Tactical Fighter Squadron as well as the 104th TFS. At Cannon AFB, the Group's mission was to act as a filler unit for the 27th Tactical Fighter Wing which were deployed to the Vietnam War. At Cannon, the squadron trained active Air Force pilots in forward air controller duties. The unit did not deploy overseas. The units were returned to New York and Maryland state control on 20 December 1968 when the TAC 4429th Combat Crew Training Squadron was activated with regular active-duty Air Force personnel.

In 1970, the F-86H Sabres were transferred after being with the 104th TFS for thirteen years. The 104th was one of the last ANG units to fly the F-86. The Sabres, however, were not retired, but instead transferred to the United States Navy which used them both as target drones and as MiG simulators for TOP GUN aggressor training. The F-86H had a similar size, shape, and performance as the MiG-17 fighter then being encountered over North Vietnam, and many a Navy F-4 pilot was "killed" by a F-86H Sabre during these mock battles.

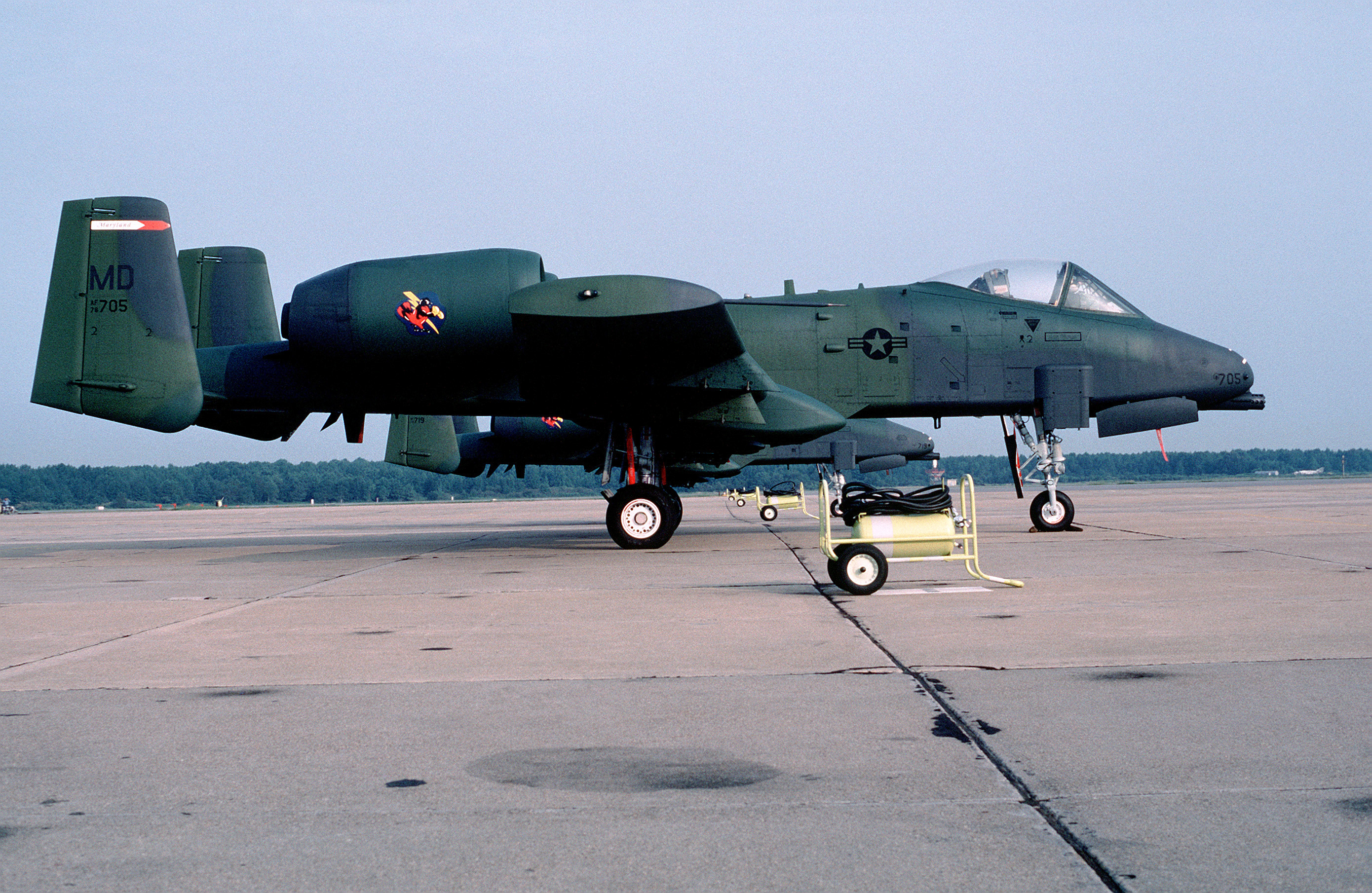
104th TFS A-10A Thunderbolt II 78-0705 at Naval Air Station Oceana, 1989.

In return, the 104th TFS received Cessna A-37B Dragonfly ground-attack aircraft. In the Vietnam War, the A-37 was a very effective ground support aircraft that was simple to operate, maintain and fly. The mission of the 104th was to train in the aircraft to support Air Force and Army special forces personnel and units. In 1974, after the end of American participation in Vietnam, the unit began supporting the Military Assistance Program (MAP) by supplying training to Latin American Air Forces. In addition, in the OA-37 configuration, the aircraft was used as a Forward Air Control (FAC) aircraft, that replaced the aging O-2 Skymaster. In the OA-37 configuration, the aircraft was equipped with small rocket pods, usually with smoke or white phosphorus warheads used for target marking.

In 1979, the 175th TFG was the first Air National Guard unit to receive the Fairchild Republic A-10A Thunderbolt II ground support aircraft. The 104th received brand new A-10A Thunderbolt II attack aircraft from the factory in Hagerstown, Maryland. The unit continues to fly the latest version (A-10C) of the famed tank killer.

==== Modern era ====
Early in the 1990s with the declared end of the Cold War and the continued decline in military budgets, the Air Force restructured to meet changes in strategic requirements, decreasing personnel, and a smaller infrastructure. The 175th adopted the new USAF "Objective Organization" in early 1992, with the word "tactical" being eliminated from its designation and becoming the 175th Fighter Group. Tactical Air Command was inactivated on 1 June, being replaced by the new Air Combat Command (ACC).

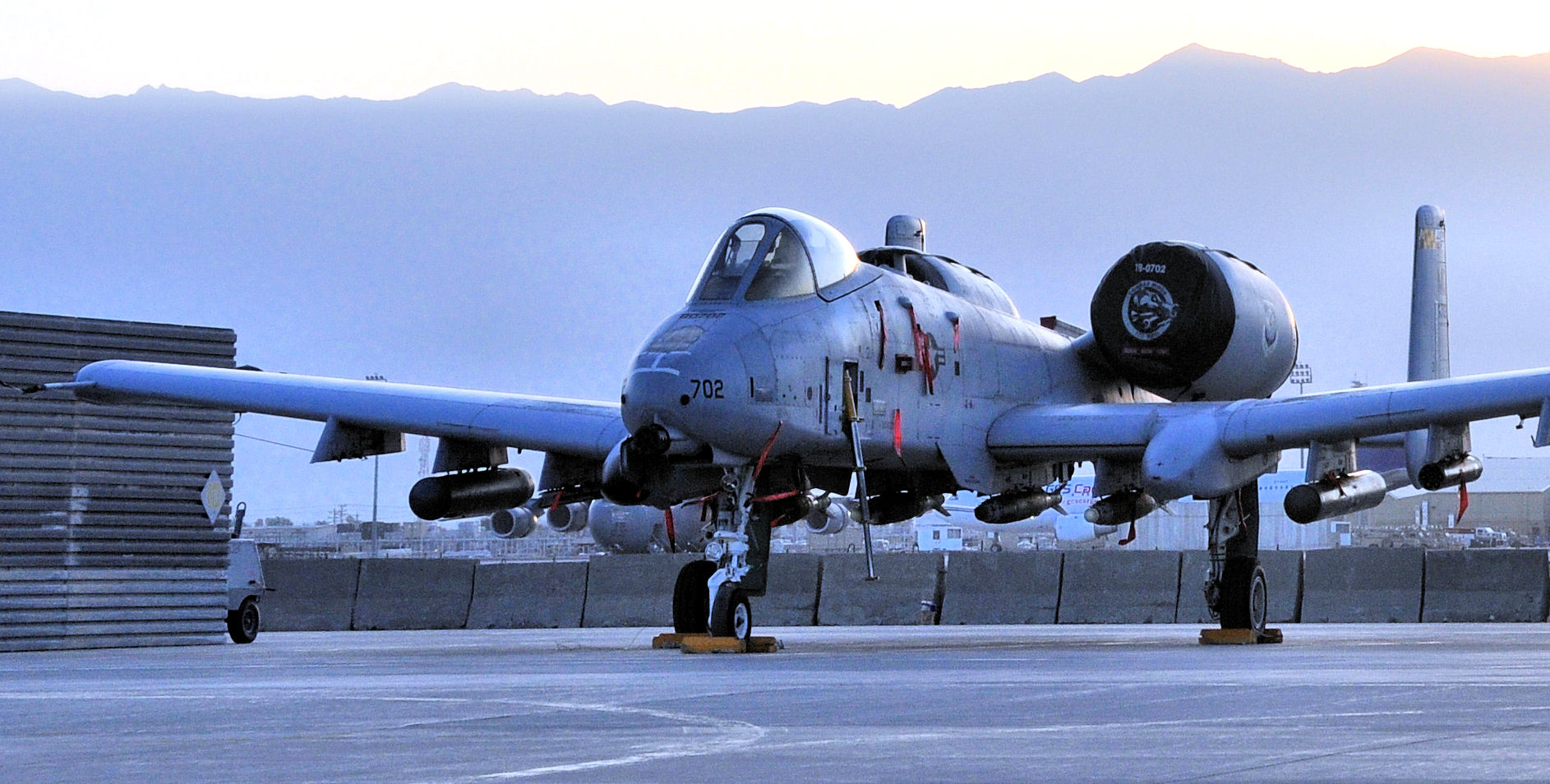
104th EFS A-10C Thunderbolt II 78-0702 sits on the aircraft ramp at Bagram Airfield, Afghanistan, 2012.

On 15 June 1996, in accordance with the Air Force "One Wing, One Base" directive, the units of the 135th Airlift Group and 175th Fighter Wing merged to form the 175th Wing. The 175th Wing became a composite organization with an Air Combat Command-gained fighter unit, an Air Mobility Command-gained airlift unit, a United States Air Forces in Europe-gained civil engineer flight, and, from 2006 to 2016, a network warfare squadron.

In mid-1996, the Air Force, in response to budget cuts, and changing world situations, began experimenting with Air Expeditionary organizations. The Air Expeditionary Force (AEF) concept was developed that would mix Active-Duty, Reserve and Air National Guard elements into a combined force. Instead of entire permanent units deploying as "Provisional" as in the 1991 Gulf War, Expeditionary units are composed of "aviation packages" from several wings, including active-duty Air Force, the Air Force Reserve Command and the Air National Guard, would be married together to carry out the assigned deployment rotation.

Following the terrorist attack of 11 September 2001, members of the 175th Wing repeatedly volunteered or have been mobilized to take part in the global war on terrorism. From January to June 2003, the 104th Expeditionary Fighter Squadron was formed and deployed to Bagram Air Base, Afghanistan, where it flew strikes against Taliban and al Qaeda forces and earned the distinction of being the longest-deployed Air National Guard fighter squadron at Bagram.

In May 2022, ten 104th A-10Cs deployed to Europe for two weeks. Four Warthogs were sent to Norway, while the other six deployed to North Macedonia. While in Europe, the Fightin' O's also visited Estonia, Latvia, Lithuania and Poland as part of Agile Combat Employment training.

During the summer of 2025 the squadron saw a majority of their A-10s retired and or handed down to other squadrons. Finally on 23 September 2025 the last two A-10s (79-0175 and 79-0104) departed Warfield Air National Guard Base, marking the end of the A-10 era for the 104th Fighter Squadron. A-10s 79-0088 and 79-0087 are both now stored in aviation museums, 088 being stored at the Air Mobility Command Museum, DE and 087 being stored at the Hagerstown Aviation Museum, MD.

=== Lineage ===
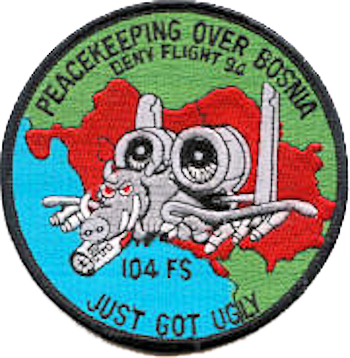
1994 Operation Deny Flight patch

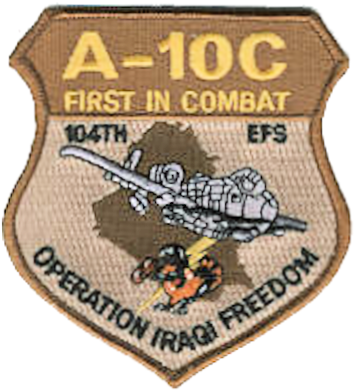
Operation Iraqi Freedom deployment patch, 2006

- Constituted in the National Guard in 1921 as the 104th Squadron (Observation) and allotted to the state of Maryland
- Organized and Federally recognized on 29 June 1921
- Re-designated 104th Observation Squadron on 25 January 1923
- Ordered into active service on 3 February 1941
- Re-designated: 104th Observation Squadron (Light) on 13 January 1942
- Re-designated: 104th Observation Squadron on 4 July 1942
- Inactivated on 18 October 1942
- Activated on 1 March 1943
- Re-designated: 104th Reconnaissance Squadron (Fighter) on 2 April 1943
- Re-designated: 489th Fighter Squadron on 11 August 1943
- Disbanded on: 1 May 1944.
- Reconstituted on 21 June 1945
- Re-designated: 104th Fighter Squadron and allotted to Maryland ANG on 24 May 1946
- Extended federal recognition on 17 August 1946
- Re-designated: 104th Fighter-Interceptor Squadron in Aug 1951
- Re-designated: 104th Fighter-Bomber Squadron on 1 December 1952
- Re-designated: 104th Fighter-Interceptor Squadron in Jun 1956
- Re-designated: 104th Tactical Fighter Squadron on 10 November 1958
- Federalized and ordered to active service on: 13 May 1968
- Released from active duty and returned to Maryland control, 20 December 1968
- Re-designated: 104th Fighter Squadron on 15 March 1992

Components designated as: 104th Expeditionary Fighter Squadron when deployed as part of an Air and Space Expeditionary unit after June 1996.

- Inactivated following the divestment and retirement of the unit's last A-10C Thunderbolt II on 23 September 2025

=== Assignments ===
- 29th Division Air Service (later 29th Division Aviation), 29 June 1921 - 3 February 1941
- II Corps, 3 February 1941 - 1 September 1941
- 59th Observation Group, 1 September 1941 – 18 October 1942 (inactivated)
- 59th Observation Group (later Reconnaissance, Fighter) Group, 1 March 1943 – 1 May 1944
- Maryland Air National Guard, 17 August 1946 - 1 October 1962

Aligned under 53d Fighter Wing, 17 January 1947 - 16 October 1950
Aligned under 113th Fighter Group, 16 October 1950 - February 1951
Aligned under 112th Fighter Group, February 1951 - 1 January 1953
Aligned under 113th Fighter Group, 1 January 1953 - 1 October 1962

- 175th Tactical Fighter Group (later 175th Fighter Group), 1 October 1962 - 15 March 1992
- 175th Operations Group, 1 April 1996 – 23 September 2025

=== Stations ===
- Logan Field, Baltimore, Maryland, 29 June 1921 - 9 June 1941
- Detrick Field, Frederick, Maryland, 10 June 1941 - 2 Jan 1942

Operated from Fort Dix Army Airfield, New Jersey, 30 December 1941 – 3 January 1942

- Atlantic City Municipal Airport, New Jersey, 3 January 1942 - 18 October 1942 (inactivated)
- Birmingham Army Airfield, Alabama, 18 October 1942
- Page Field, Florida, 1 March 1943 - 30 March 1943
- Thomasville Army Airfield, Georgia, 30 March 1943 – 1 May 1944 (disbanded)
- Harbor Field, Baltimore, Maryland, 17 August 1946 - 26 July 1955
- Martin State Airport, Baltimore, Maryland, 26 July 1957 - 10 June 1968

Flight operated from: Andrews Air Force Base, Maryland, 1955 – 1957
Flight operated from: Friendship Airport, Glen Burnie, Maryland, 1954 – 1957

- Cannon Air Force Base, New Mexico, 10 June 1968 – 9 December 1968
- Martin State Airport, Baltimore, Maryland, 9 December 1968 – 23 September 2025

Designated: Warfield Air National Guard Base, Maryland, 1982

=== Aircraft ===
- Curtiss JN-4 (includes JN4D, JN4H and JNS),1921–1927
- Consolidated TW-3 Trusty, 1925–1930
- Douglas O-2C, 1926–1927
- Consolidated PT-1 Trusty, 1927–1933
- Curtiss O-11 Falcon, 1928–1932
- Consolidated O-17 Courier, 1928–1933
- Northrop BT-1, 1929–1934
- Douglas O-38, 1930–1937
- Stinson O-49 Vigilant, 1935–1942
- Douglas O-46, 1937–1941
- North American O-47A, 1938–1942
- North American O-47B, 1940–1941
- North American BC-1A Texan, 1940–1941
- Bell P-39 Airacobra, 1943–1944
- Republic F-47D Thunderbolt, 1946–1951
- North American F-51H Mustang, 1951–1954
- North American F-51D Mustang, 1954–1955
- North American F-86E Sabre, 1956
- North American F-86H Sabre, 1957–1970
- Cessna A-37B Dragonfly, 1970–1980
- Fairchild Republic A-10A Thunderbolt II, 1979–2007
- Fairchild Republic A-10C Thunderbolt II, 2007–2025

Aircraft operated by the 104th Fighter Squadron
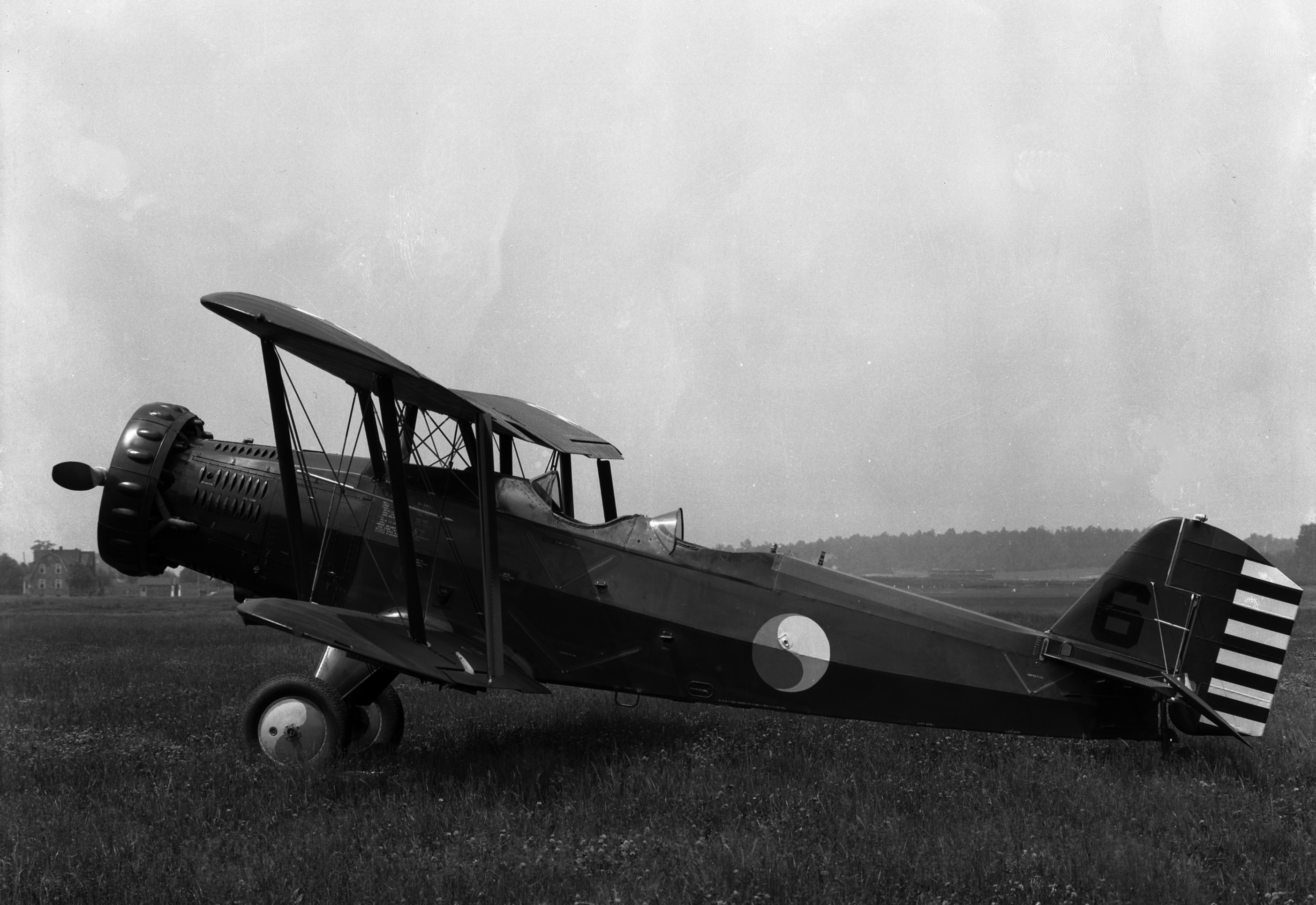
Maryland National Guard O-38B, used from 1932 to 1937

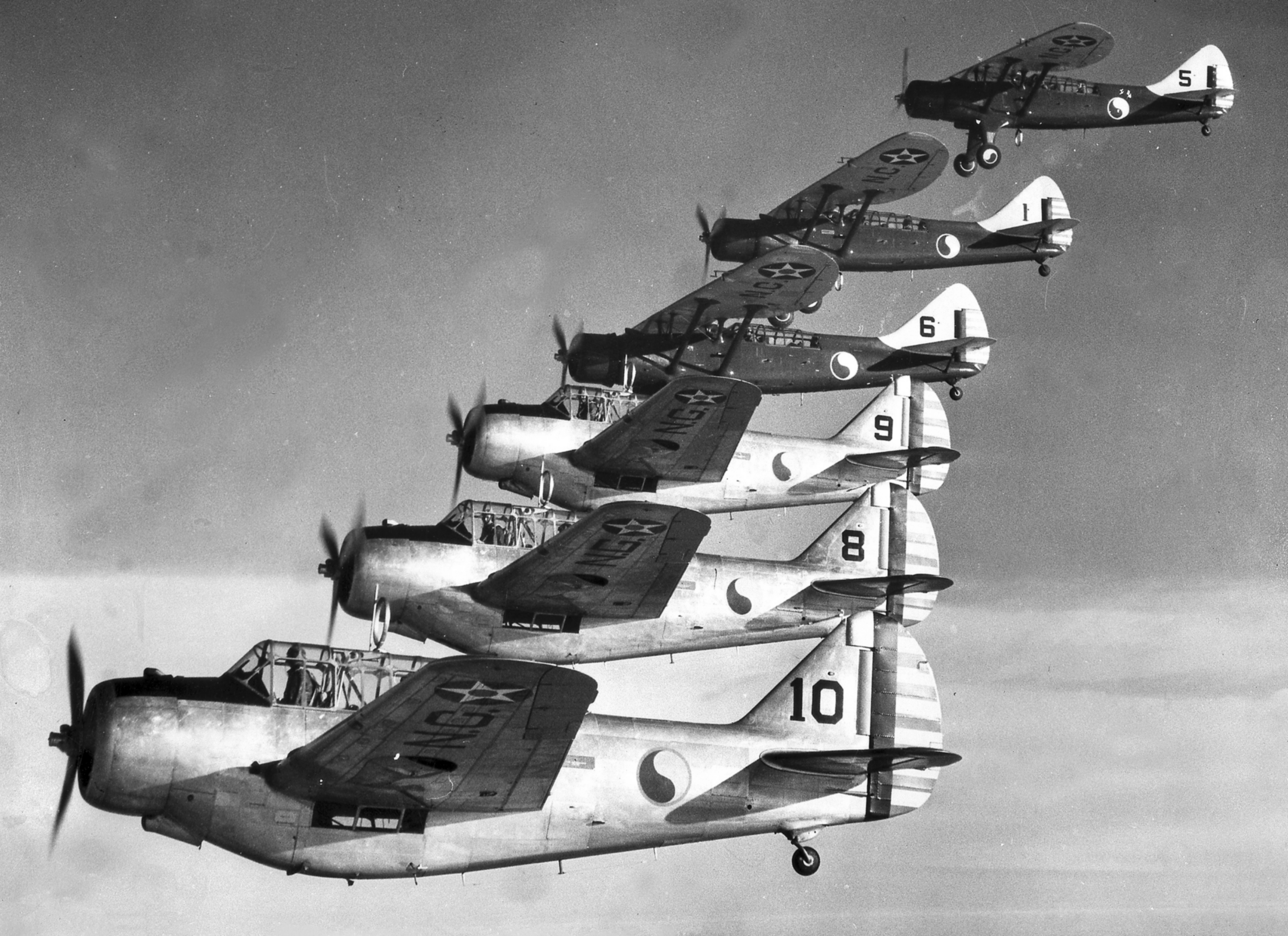
Three Douglas O-46A and three North American O-47 aircraft assigned to the Maryland National Guard's 104th Observation Squadron, 1940

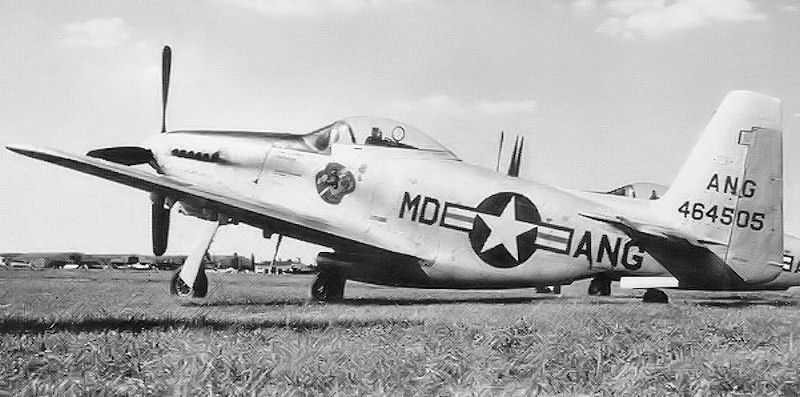
North American F-51H 44-64505 of the 104th FIS, 1952

== See also ==
- List of observation squadrons of the United States Army National Guard
- William Tipton World War I fighter pilot who was one of the founding members of the 104th Observation Squadron, the original unit of the Maryland Air National Guard (MDANG).
