= Frederick Detrick =

American physician (1889–1931)

Frederick Louis Detrick
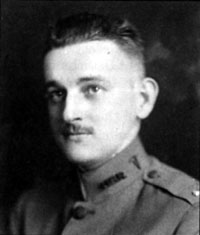
- Born: April 21, 1889; New Market, Maryland, U.S.
- Died: June 3, 1931 (aged 42); Baltimore, Maryland, U.S.
- Military career
- Allegiance: United States
- Branch: United States Army
- Service years: 1918–1919
- Rank: Major
- Units: Medical Reserve Corps; 28th Aero Squadron
- Conflicts: First World War: Battle of Saint-Mihiel; Meuse/Argonne
- Other work: Doctor, Academic

Frederick Louis Detrick (April 21, 1889 in New Market, Maryland – June 3, 1931 in Baltimore, Maryland), was a U.S. Army physician, flight surgeon and pilot. He is the namesake of Fort Detrick, Maryland (formerly, Detrick Field and Camp Detrick). Detrick, who was a teaching surgeon on the faculty of the Johns Hopkins Hospital in Baltimore, served in France during World War I, and was a member of the Maryland National Guard when he died of a heart attack in 1931.

== Biography ==
Although born in Frederick County, Maryland, where his family had lived for five generations, Detrick lived a portion of his childhood in Orange, Virginia, where his grandfather owned Montpelier, President James Madison's former home. He graduated from the Rockefeller Institute and completed his medical internship at Bellevue Hospital, both in New York City. He was appointed a lieutenant in the Medical Reserve Corps, U.S. Army in April 1918. His first brief assignment was to the installation hospital at Camp Wadsworth, South Carolina, followed by a tour of duty with the 28th Aero Squadron, 3rd Pursuit Group in France. He supported the major American offensives at the battles of Saint-Mihiel and of Meuse/Argonne. He was discharged at Camp Dix, New Jersey, in July 1919.

Detrick returned to Baltimore and opened a private practice on Linden Avenue, eventually earning a teaching position on the staff and faculty of Johns Hopkins University Hospital. He joined the Maryland National Guard in 1923 and was appointed a captain in the Medical Reserve Corps with an assignment to the Medical Department Detachment, 29th Division Aviation, which included the 104th Observation Squadron. The 104th still exists as part of the Maryland Air National Guard.

Detrick died at home on June 3, 1931, after a series of heart attacks. His unit, which each summer conducted annual training at Langley Field, Virginia, then had orders to conduct its next encampment at a new site: Frederick Airport at Frederick, Maryland. Squadron members had great affection for their flight surgeon. The 104th, in consultation with the Maryland National Guard Adjutant General, Major General Milton Reckord, resolved to name the airport "Detrick Field" in his memory. Reckord also issued orders posthumously promoting Captain Detrick to the rank of Major.
