= Logan Field (Maryland) =

Airport located in Dundalk, Maryland, US

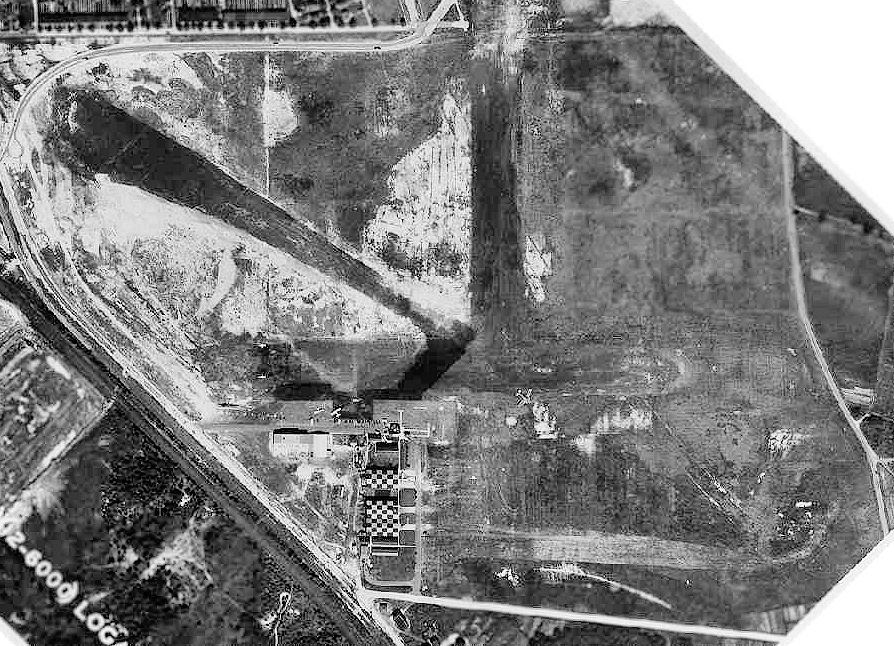
- A September 1938 aerial view of Logan Field (courtesy of the National Archives, photo # 18-LMU-V1-850G).
- IATA: none; ICAO: none

Summary
- Serves: Baltimore, Maryland
- Built: 1920
- In use: 1920–1945
- Coordinates: 39°14′57″N 076°31′10″W

Map
- Logan Field, Baltimore Logan Field (Maryland) Logan Field (the United States)

Runways
| Direction | Length | | Surface |
| Direction | ft | m | Surface |
|---|---|---|---|
| 14/36 | 3,000 | 914 | Asphalt/Cinder |
| 00/18 | 2,000 | 610 | Asphalt/Cinder |
| 09/27 | 2,000 | 610 | Asphalt/Cinder |

Logan Field, also known as Dundalk Flying Field, is a former airport located in the town of Dundalk, Maryland, northeast of the Francis Scott Key Bridge, near Baltimore.

== Name ==
Although Logan Field was originally named the Dundalk Flying Field, it was almost immediately renamed. On July 5, 1920, Army Lt. Patrick H. Logan was fatally injured after his aircraft, a World War I vintage French Nieuport 28 nicknamed the "Red Devil," crashed at the field's inaugural air show. In response to the tragedy, the airfield was renamed in Logan's honor during the closing ceremonies of the air show during which he died.

== Facilities ==
Logan Field consisted of three landing strips of turf-and-cinder construction: a 3,000-foot runway and two 2,000-foot runways. The field had a number of small clapboard buildings to handle passengers and mail, as well as simple hangar facilities, including military facilities for the Maryland National Guard's 104th Observation Squadron.

== History ==
Opened in 1920, Logan Field was a 100-acre tract located at the intersection of Dundalk Avenue and Belclare Road in southeast Baltimore County. It lay on the Patapsco Neck peninsula, which jutted out into the Chesapeake Bay between the Patapsco River on the south and Back River on the north. The airport lay near small suburban communities that would later grow extensively after the Second World War (1941–1945), including Dundalk, Essex, and Middle River. Closer to Baltimore were the neighborhoods of Highlandtown and Canton, which bordered closely on the new airport and future harbor port facilities.

Beginning in 1921, Logan Field was the home base of the Maryland National Guard's newly organized aerial unit, the 104th Observation Squadron, just after the first experiences of combat aviation in World War I (1917–1918).

The field expanded facilities in 1929 with lighting for night operations. By the 1930s, Logan Field boasted regular commercial flights between Baltimore and Washington, New York, Atlantic City, and Miami. It also hosted regular air meets and was visited by such aviation luminaries as Charles Lindbergh, Amelia Earhart and Douglas "Wrong Way" Corrigan.

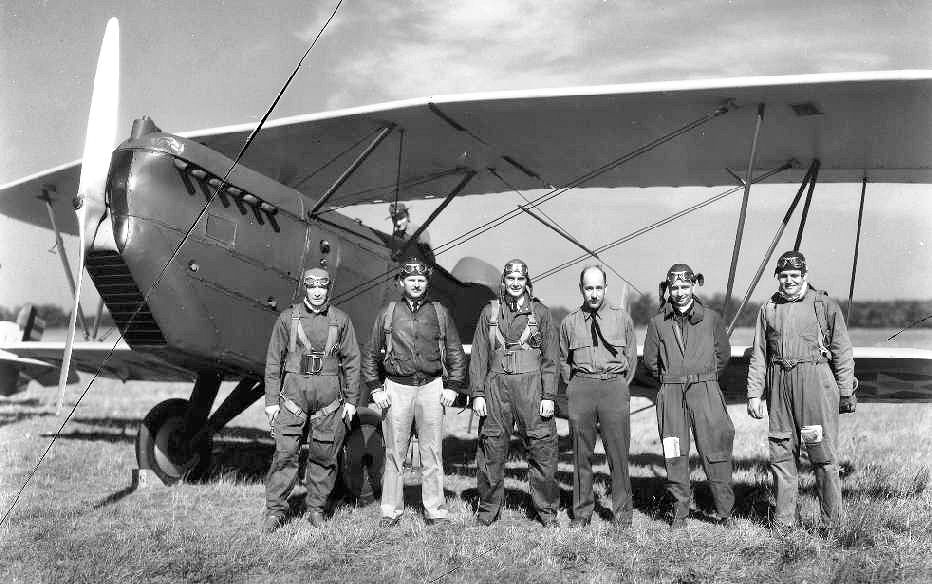
A 1930 photo of MD National Guard 104th Observation Squadron pilots in front of one of the unit's O-11 Falcons at the unit's home station, Logan Field.

During World War II, Logan Field, along with the newly constructed adjacent Baltimore Municipal Airport, was controlled by the military. In 1943, Logan was closed to air traffic and converted into a prisoner-of-war camp for Axis soldiers, mainly Germans and a few Italians. It was one of several hundred such camps housing German POWs, who provided labor at farms in the area.

Logan Field was not reopened after World War II. Instead, civil aviation moved to the newer, more modern and expansive facilities at the Baltimore Municipal Airport, which had been constructed adjacent to Logan Field beginning in 1929, and featured a 1930s Art Deco-style passenger terminal. The terminal served the patrons of Pan-American Airways' "Flying Clipper" service — featuring the new Boeing Company "flying boats" — which offered routes across the Atlantic and Pacific Oceans, although with several stages and stops.

== Closure ==
Within a few years of the end of the war, the land that had once been Logan Field was transformed into the residential neighborhood of Logan Village. Today, with the exception of a historical marker at the Logan Village shopping center, there is no evidence of Logan Field's existence.
