= Digital Maryland =

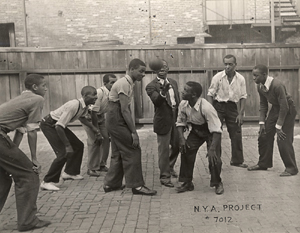
Photograph from the mid-1930s of a basketball game played in Baltimore as part of the National Youth Administration (NYA) recreation program. From Digital Maryland's "Views of African American Life in Maryland" collection.

Digital Maryland, formerly Maryland Digital Cultural Heritage (MDCH), is a collaborative, statewide digitization program. Headquartered at the Enoch Pratt Free Library/State Library Resource Center in Baltimore, the program partners with Maryland libraries, archives, historical societies, museums, and other institutions to digitize and provide free online access to materials relating to the state's history and culture. Materials in Digital Maryland's online digital collections include maps, manuscripts, photographs, artwork, books, and other media.

== History ==
The program began in 2002 with a Library Services and Technology Act (LSTA) grant administered by the Maryland State Department of Education's Division of Library Development and Services (DLDS). The grant funded an initial survey of institutions, the goal of which was to learn about collections relevant to any aspect of Maryland's state, regional, and local culture and history. The survey gathered information on each collection regarding: content; age; condition; quantity of items; relationships to other collections; copyright issues; existing catalogs and indexes; and items of particular interest and/or value. The LSTA grant also provided the basis for the purchase of digitization equipment and the creation of a union catalog. Early on in the program, Digital Maryland established digitization standards and metadata guidelines for its collections.

== Collections and Access ==
The Digital Maryland website currently has over 170 collections of items pertaining to a variety of subjects, people, events, and geographic locations in Maryland. New collections are added on a regular basis. Collection overviews provide the location of the original items and a description of the collection. Visitors to the Digital Maryland site are able to view digitized items and data about each item by browsing within a collection, or by performing a search.
