= 135th Airlift Group =

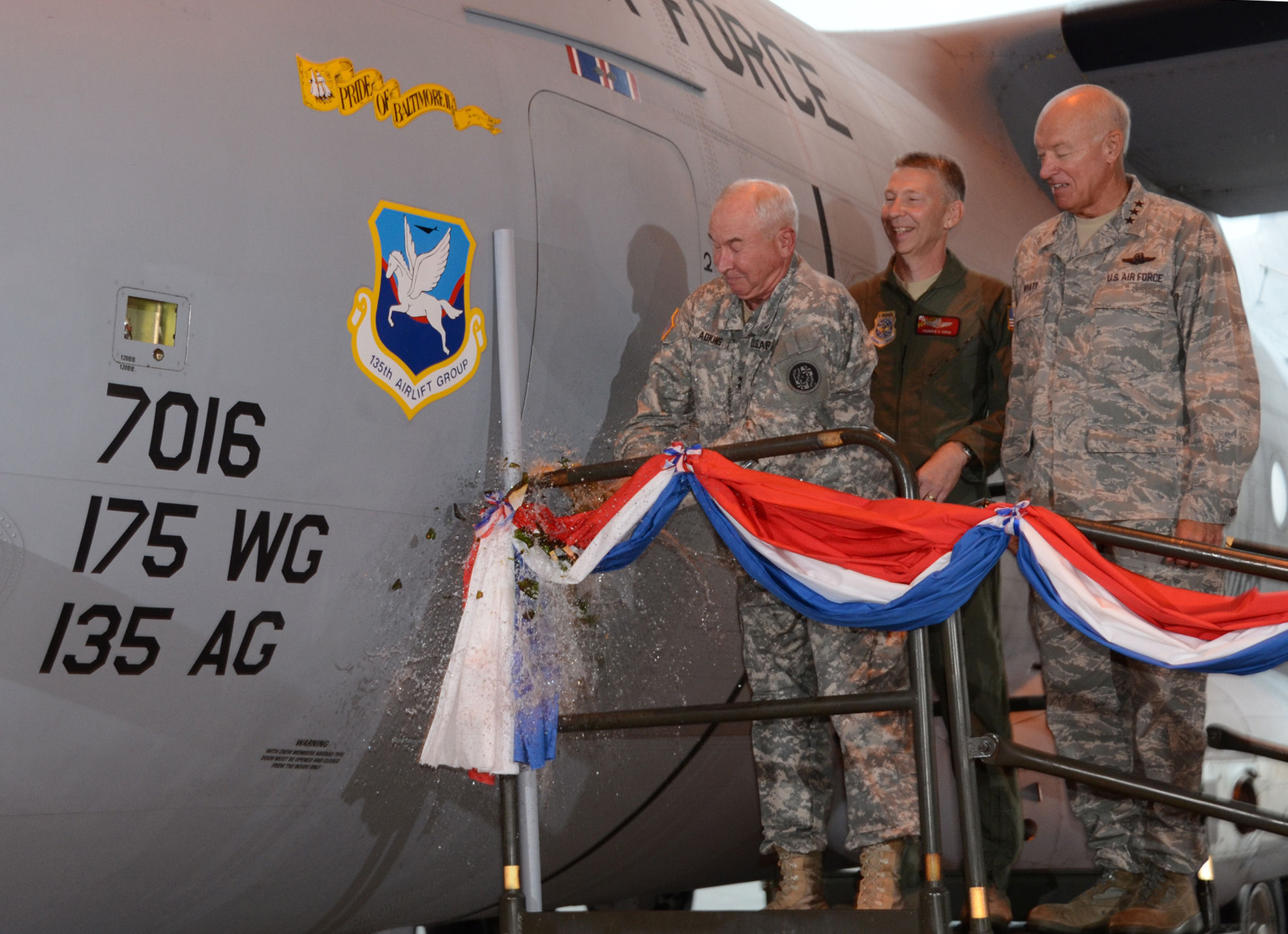
- Maj. Gen. James A. Adkins, Adjutant General, christens the new C-27J Spartan during an arrival ceremony 13 August 2011, at Warfield Air National Guard Base, Baltimore, MD while Col. Thomas E. Hans, commander 135th Airlift Group and Lt. Gen. Harry M. Wyatt III, Director, Air National Guard, watch.
- Active: 1955–2016
- Country: United States
- Allegiance: Maryland
- Branch: Air National Guard
- Type: Group
- Role: Airlift
- Part of: Maryland Air National Guard
- Garrison/HQ: Warfield Air National Guard Base, Middle River, Maryland
- Tail Code: "Baltimore" Black/Yellow tailstirpe

Insignia
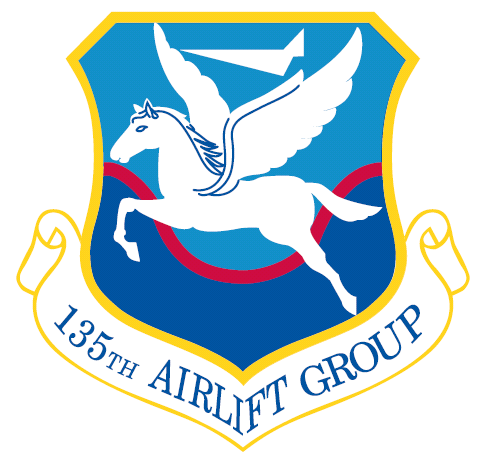
- 135th Airlift Group emblem

The 135th Airlift Group (135 AG) is an inactive unit of the United States Air Force, allotted to the Maryland Air National Guard. At the time of its inactivation, it was assigned to the 175th Wing, stationed at Warfield Air National Guard Base, Middle River, Maryland. The unit cased its colors 27 Sep 2013 and was expected to inactivate at the end of the month, but the inactivation request was never processed and it remained active but unmanned until 2016. It officially inactivated 1 May 2016.

== Overview ==
The 135th Airlift Group mission was to maintain combat-ready aircrew and aircraft to mobilize, deploy and provide intra-theater airlift in support of U.S. interests worldwide. It supported theater commanders' requirements for combat delivery capability through tactical airland/airdrop operations and humanitarian aeromedical evacuations.

== Units ==
- 135th Airlift Squadron
- 135th Operations Support Flight
- 135th Maintenance Squadron
- 135th Aircraft Maintenance Squadron
- 135th Maintenance Operations Flight

== History ==
=== Special operations ===
The Maryland Air National Guard's introduction to the world of special operations began when Air Force leaders decided to phase out active duty air commando units in 1954. Despite the decision, there was still a need to maintain a limited number of crews and aircraft to support unconventional warfare missions. After lengthy deliberations, the Air Force decided in 1955 to establish four special air warfare units within the Air National Guard: the 129th Air Resupply Group in California, the 130th in West Virginia, the 143d in Rhode Island, and the 135th in Maryland.

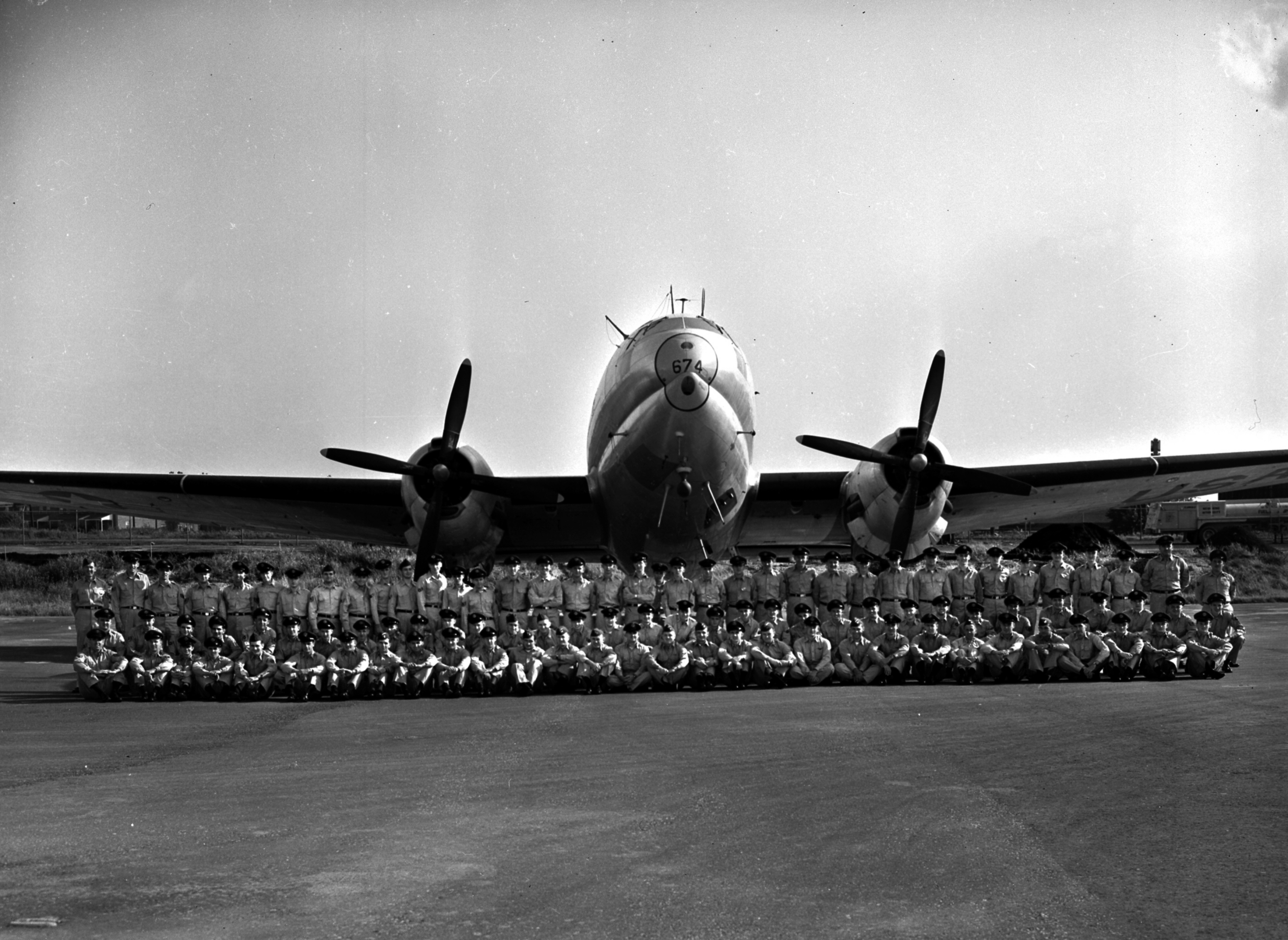
Members of 135th Air Supply Group with their C-46 Commando, 1955.

The 135th Air Resupply Squadron was established in September 1955 as a new Maryland Air National Guard unit with no previous United States Air Force history or lineage by the National Guard Bureau. Activated on 10 September at Harbor Field, Baltimore, Maryland, the squadron was assigned to the 135th Air Resupply Group. Allocated to Military Air Transport Service (MATS), and equipped with C-46D Commando transports.

The 135th was designated at the time as a "Psychological Warfare" unit which supported USAF unconventional warfare (guerrilla warfare), direct action (commando-type raids), strategic reconnaissance (intelligence gathering), and PSYWAR operations. The C-46 was supplemented by SA-16 Albatross amphibious aircraft beginning in 1956. The SA-16 (later redesignated HU-16) completely replaced the C-46s in late 1958. Training for water landings with the SA-16 was extremely hazardous. To make matters worse, doctrine required pilots to land their aircraft on water at night, with no landing lights. Night water landings were practiced at Patuxent River Naval Air Station in southern Maryland. Three crewmen were killed when their plane crashed after accidentally contacting the water surface during a low approach in May 1956.

Ultimately, the 135th's mission included counterinsurgency, military civic action, psychological operations, tactical air operations, and unconventional warfare. In addition to blacked-out water landings, the SA-16 crews practiced pulling personnel from the ground by means of the Fulton Recovery System, which retired Col. Richard T. Lynch, a former 135th commander, described as being "like bungee jumping in reverse."

In 1958, the group was inactivated and it began reporting directly to the Maryland Air National Guard. However, it was reactivated in 1962 and re-designated as the 135th Air Commando Group following the revival of an active duty air commando unit at Hurlburt Field, Florida in line with President John F. Kennedy's initiative to bolster the United States military special forces during the early involvement in the Vietnam War.

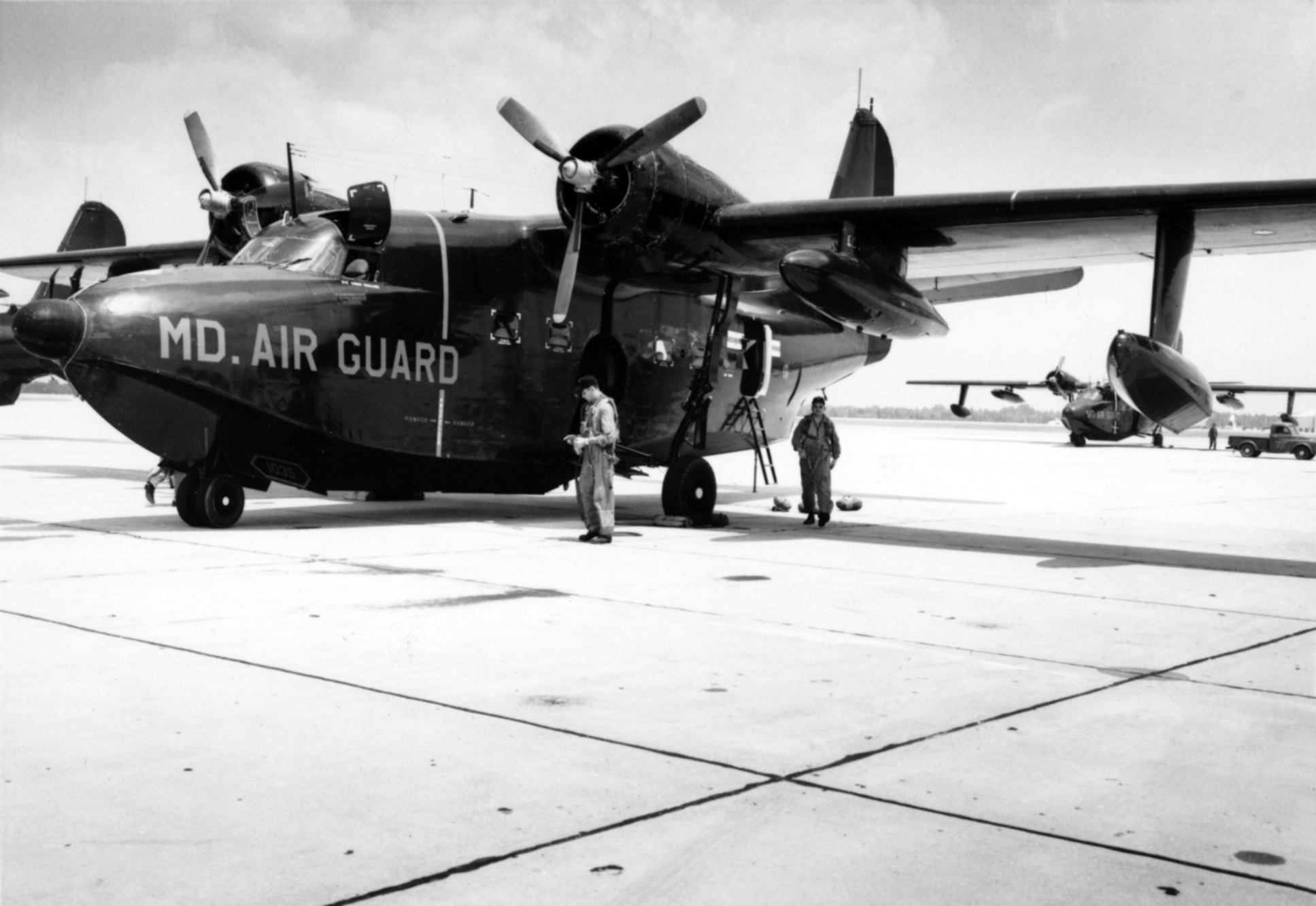
335th Air Commando Squadron HU-16B Albatross in the early 1960s

In 1963, the 135th added U-10 Super Couriers to its inventory. The U-10s were used for infiltration, extraction and psychological operations. These aircraft were temporarily replaced by U-6 Beavers from 1965 to 1967 due to a need for U-10s in Vietnam. In 1963, the 135th participated in Exercise Swift Strike III, one of the largest military maneuvers since World War II. During the exercise, the unit not only flew a variety of special air warfare missions, but received an operational readiness inspection from Tactical Air Command to boot.

The 135th also worked with U.S. intelligence agencies. A common mission was to pick up agents in training, fly a zig-zag course to make sure they didn't know where they were headed, then have them parachute out over western Maryland. The trainees then had to make their way to Patuxent with only the resources they carried—sometimes taking as much as six weeks to do so. The 135th would then fly down to "extract" the trainees and bring them home.

The unit's loudspeaker-equipped U-10s were used to broadcast orders to student protesters at the University of Maryland during demonstrations in 1971, their only actual operational use by the 135th.

It remained a special operations-type unit until 1971, when it was reorganized as a tactical air support unit. In this role, it was tasked with providing Forward Air Controllers to direct air strikes in support of troops on the ground.

=== Tactical airlift ===
In 1977 it was again reorganized, this time as a tactical airlift unit as part of a general program to upgrade Air National Guard units. Was assigned the C-7A Caribou light transport, the aircraft being Vietnam War veterans. In 1980, the unit converted to the C-130B Hercules. In 1981, it moved across the field to join other Maryland Air National Guard units based on the north side of the field. The military facilities are named Warfield Air National Guard Base. During the early 1990s, the 135th participated in humanitarian relief efforts in Somalia, peacekeeping and humanitarian relief in Bosnia, the U.S. intervention in Haiti and the enforcement of U.N. sanctions against Iraq during the 1990s.

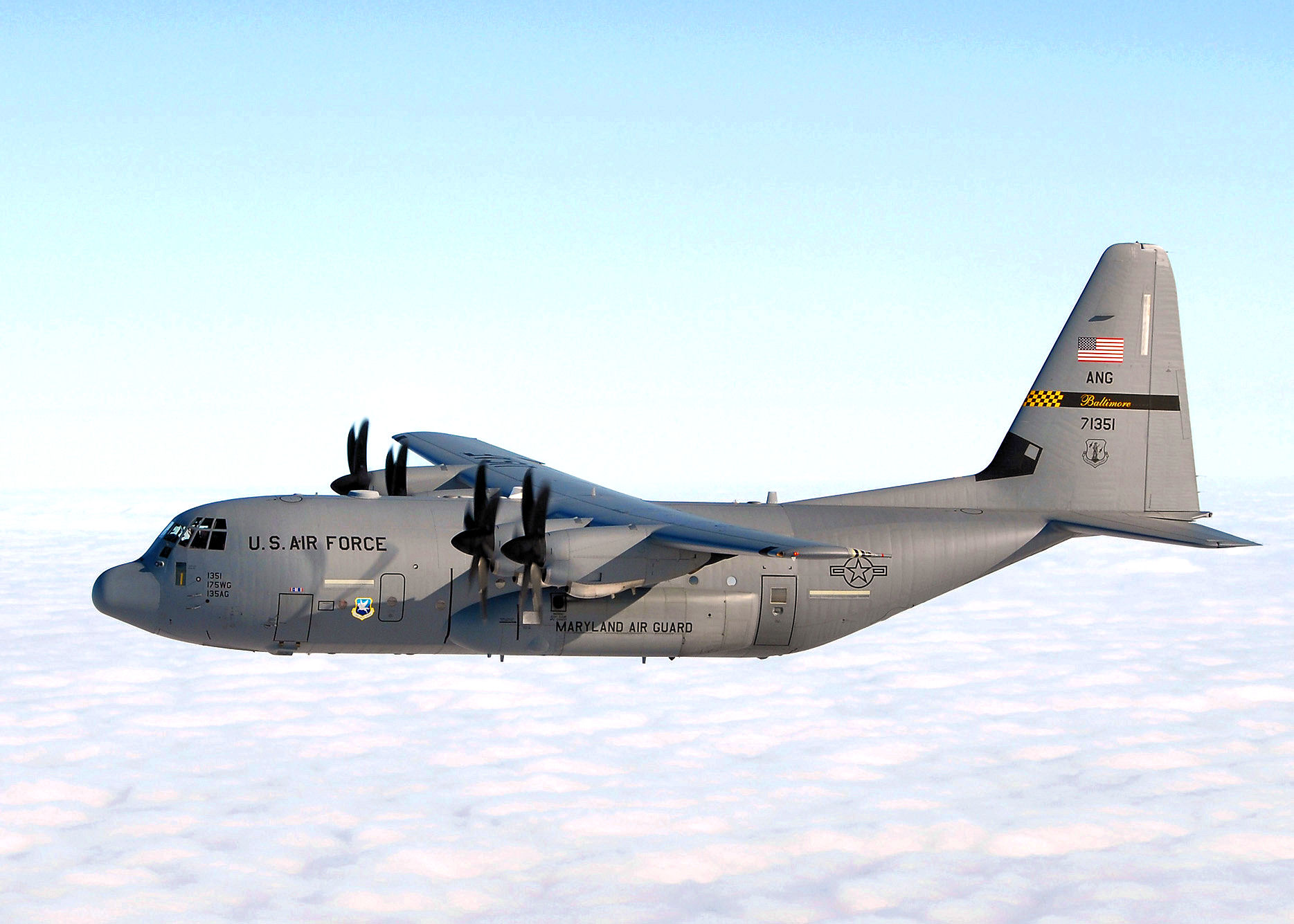
135th Airlift Squadron C-130J 97-3151

In mid-1996, the Air Force, in response to budget cuts, and changing world situations, began experimenting with Air Expeditionary organizations. The Air Expeditionary Force (AEF) concept was developed that would mix Active-Duty, Reserve and Air National Guard elements into a combined force. Instead of entire permanent units deploying as "Provisional" as in the 1991 Gulf War, Expeditionary units are composed of "aviation packages" from several wings, including active-duty Air Force, the Air Force Reserve Command and the Air National Guard, would be married together to carry out the assigned deployment rotation.

On 15 June 1996, the units of the 135th and 175th Fighter Group merged to form the 175th Wing, and the 135th's group headquarters was inactivated. The 175th Wing became composite organization with an Air Combat Command-gained fighter unit and an Air Mobility Command-gained airlift unit.

Reactivated in 1999 as a separate group of the 175th Wing, it dedicated its first C-130J, the latest and most advanced version of the venerable transport. The 135th had played a major role in the test and evaluation of the aircraft and its procedures and was the first fully equipped C-130J unit in the U.S. Air Force.

In February 2000 the 135th Expeditionary Airlift Squadron (135th EAS) was first formed from 135th personnel and aircraft and deployed to Lambarene Airport, Gabon, for exercise "Gabon 2000" with the objective of increasing the capacity of ECCAS states in the field of peacekeeping and conflict prevention and management. This exercise represented a direct application of the French RECAMP-concept (reinforcement of African peacekeeping capacities).

BRAC 2005 saw the C-130J aircraft of the squadron being transferred to the 146th Airlift Wing (ANG), Channel Islands AGS, CA (four aircraft), and 143d Airlift Wing (ANG), Quonset State Airport AGS, RI (four aircraft). In 2011, the first of four planned C-27J Spartan light transport was received.

==== Operation Enduring Freedom ====
Beginning in July 2011, the 135th EAS along with the Ohio Air National Guard 164th Expeditionary Airlift Squadron began rotational deployments for joint operations of the C-27J from Kandahar Airfield, Afghanistan as the 702d Expeditionary Airlift Squadron. The 702d EAS flew the two aircraft on 3,200 missions, moved 1,400 tons of cargo, transported 25,000 passengers and executed 71 airdrops, according to Air Force data.

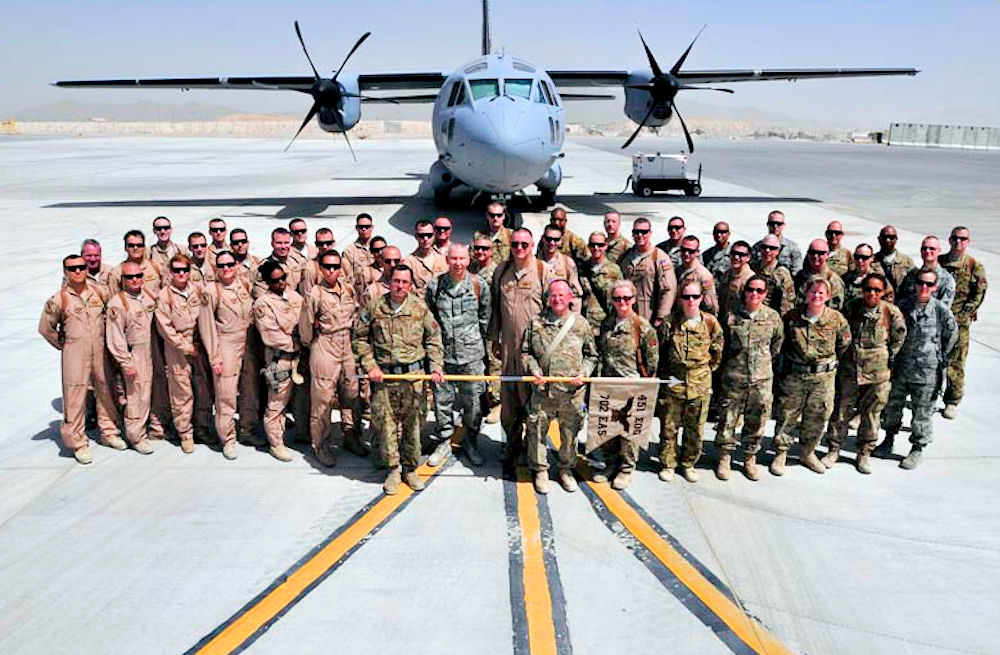
702d Expeditionary Airlift Squadron, Kandahar Airfield, Afghanistan, 2012.

In June 2012, operations of the 702d EAS were suspended by the Air Force and returned to the United States. Originally, C-27J aircraft were supposed to remain in theater through 2014, but the Air Force decided to bring all of the aircraft back to the U.S. before the end of July after it submitted its 2013 budget proposal, which recommends terminating the C-27J and retiring the aircraft.

L-3 Communications, which has maintained the aircraft in Afghanistan, is shutting down its operations in the country and is having its equipment withdrawn as well, an Air Force official said.

The Air Force decided to bring the aircraft back to the U.S. ahead of schedule because the maintenance contract with L-3 will expire this summer, the service official said. Keeping the aircraft in theater would mean spending an additional $20 million to $25 million in maintenance costs, the official said.

The end of the C-27J program "....would leave the Maryland Air Guard without the airlift capability it has used to deliver troops, equipment and supplies to isolated terrain in combat overseas and disasters in the United States.

"It also would leave the 250 pilots, loadmasters, maintenance workers and other personnel of the 135th Airlift Group without an assignment. It is unclear what will become of the group."

=== Lineage ===
- Designated: 135th Air Resupply Group, and allotted to Maryland ANG in September 1955

Extended federal recognition on 10 September 1955
Inactivated on 30 June 1958

- Re-designated: 135th Air Commando Group and extended federal recognition on 1 July 1962

Re-designated: 135th Special Operations Group, 15 June 1968
Re-designated: 135th Tactical Air Support Group, 1 July 1971
Re-designated: 135th Tactical Airlift Group, 1 July 1977
Re-designated: 135th Airlift Group, 16 March 1992
Inactivated on 1 April 1996

- Extended federal recognition and reactivated on 1 May 1999

Inactivated on 30 Sep 2013

=== Assignments ===
- Maryland Air National Guard, 10 September 1955 – 30 June 1958

Gained by: Military Air Transport Service

- Maryland Air National Guard, 1 July 1962 – 1 April 1996

Gained by Tactical Air Command 1 July 1962 – 30 June 1977
Gained by Military Airlift Command 1 July 1977 – 31 May 1992
Gained by Air Mobility Command, 1 June 1992 – 1 April 1996

- 175th Wing, 1 May 1999 – 1 May 2016

Gained by Air Mobility Command, 1 May 1999 – 1 May 2016

=== Components ===
- 135th Air Resupply (later Air Commando, Special Operations, Tactical Air Support, Tactical Airlift, Airlift) Squadron, 10 September 1955 – 30 June 1958; 1 July 1962 – 1 April 1996; 1 May 1999 – 30 September 2013

=== Stations ===
- Baltimore Municipal Airport, Maryland, 10 September 1955 – 30 June 1958
- Warfield Air National Guard Base, Maryland, 1 July 1962 – 30 September 2013

=== Aircraft ===
- C-46D Commando, 1955–1958
- HU-16A Albatross, 1956–1958
- HU-16B Albatross, 1957–1958; 1962–1971
- U-10 Super Courier, 1963–1972
- U-6A Bever, 1965–1967
- O-2A Super Skymaster, 1971–1977
- C-7A Caribou, 1977–1980
- C-130B Hercules, 1980–1989
- C-130E Hercules, 1989–1996
- C-130J Hercules, 1999–2011
- C-27J Spartan, 2011–2013

=== Decorations ===
- Air Force Outstanding Unit Award

Awarded: 1 Jan-31 Dec 1989, 1 Jan-31 Dec 1992, 1 Jan 1994-31 Dec 1995, 1 Jan 1998-30 Jun 1999, 1 Jul 1999-30 Jun 2001, 1 Jul 2002-31 Jul 2003, 1 Nov 2004-30 Oct 2006, 1 Apr 2007-31 Mar 2009
