= 135th Intelligence Squadron =

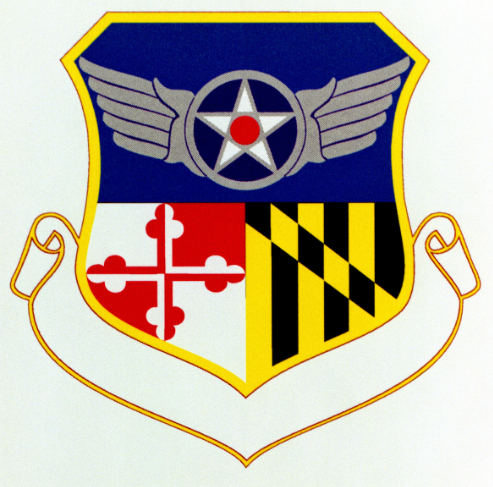
135th Intelligence Squadron

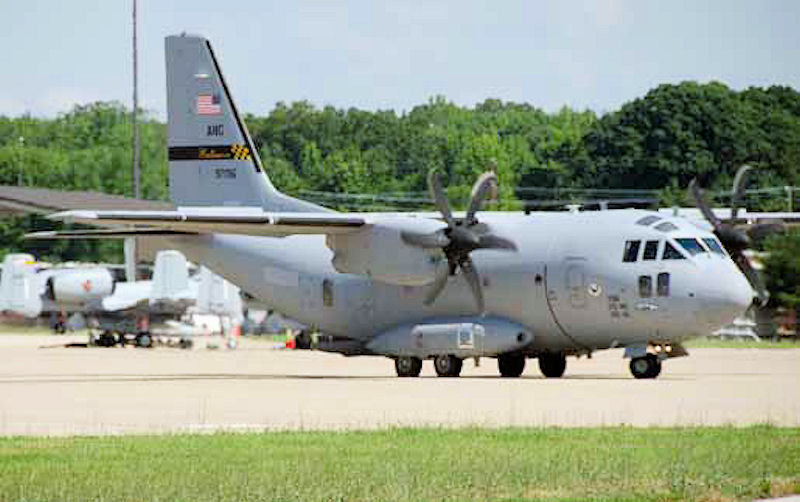
- 135th Airlift Squadron - C-27J Spartan
- Active: 1955-present
- Country: United States
- Allegiance: Maryland
- Branch: Air National Guard
- Type: Squadron
- Role: Intelligence
- Part of: Maryland Air National Guard
- Garrison/HQ: Warfield Air National Guard Base, Maryland
- Nickname: Baltimore's Best

Insignia
- 135th Airlift Squadron emblem (Note: Symbolism: Ultramarine blue and golden yellow are the Air Force colors and symbolize that the unit is a part of the Air Force. The escutcheon portrays the Seal of Maryland and signifies the home location of the unit. The crossed jousting lances reflect the military preparedness of the squadron and allude the Maryland state sport. Background: Designed by Lt Col Ronald James and approved on 3 October 1990. The motto, "Baltimore's Best" was suggested by Master Sgt. Lee Cherry and arose from the unit having been recognized by the Baltimore Is Best Committee on 18 February 1987. This insignia superseded one approved by the Air Force for the squadron in October 1960.)

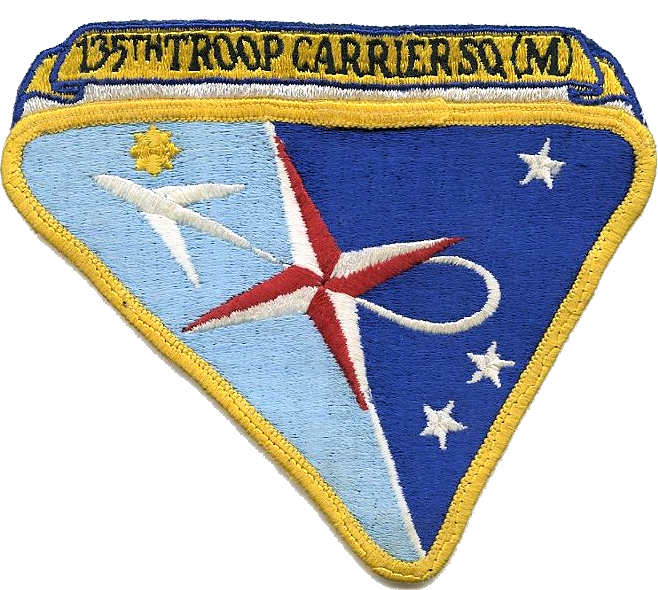
- 135th Troop Carrier Squadron emblem

The 135th Intelligence Squadron is a unit of the United States Air Force, allotted to the Maryland Air National Guard], located at Warfield Air National Guard Base, Middle River, Maryland. The 135th was active as a flying organization from 10 September 1955 to 30 September 2013. After 2013, it remained active but without assigned personnel or aircraft. In 2014, the Maryland Air National Guard requested the unit be reorganized and redesignated as the 135th Intelligence Squadron, and this request was approved by the National Guard Bureau effective 1 May 2016.

== History ==
=== Special operations ===
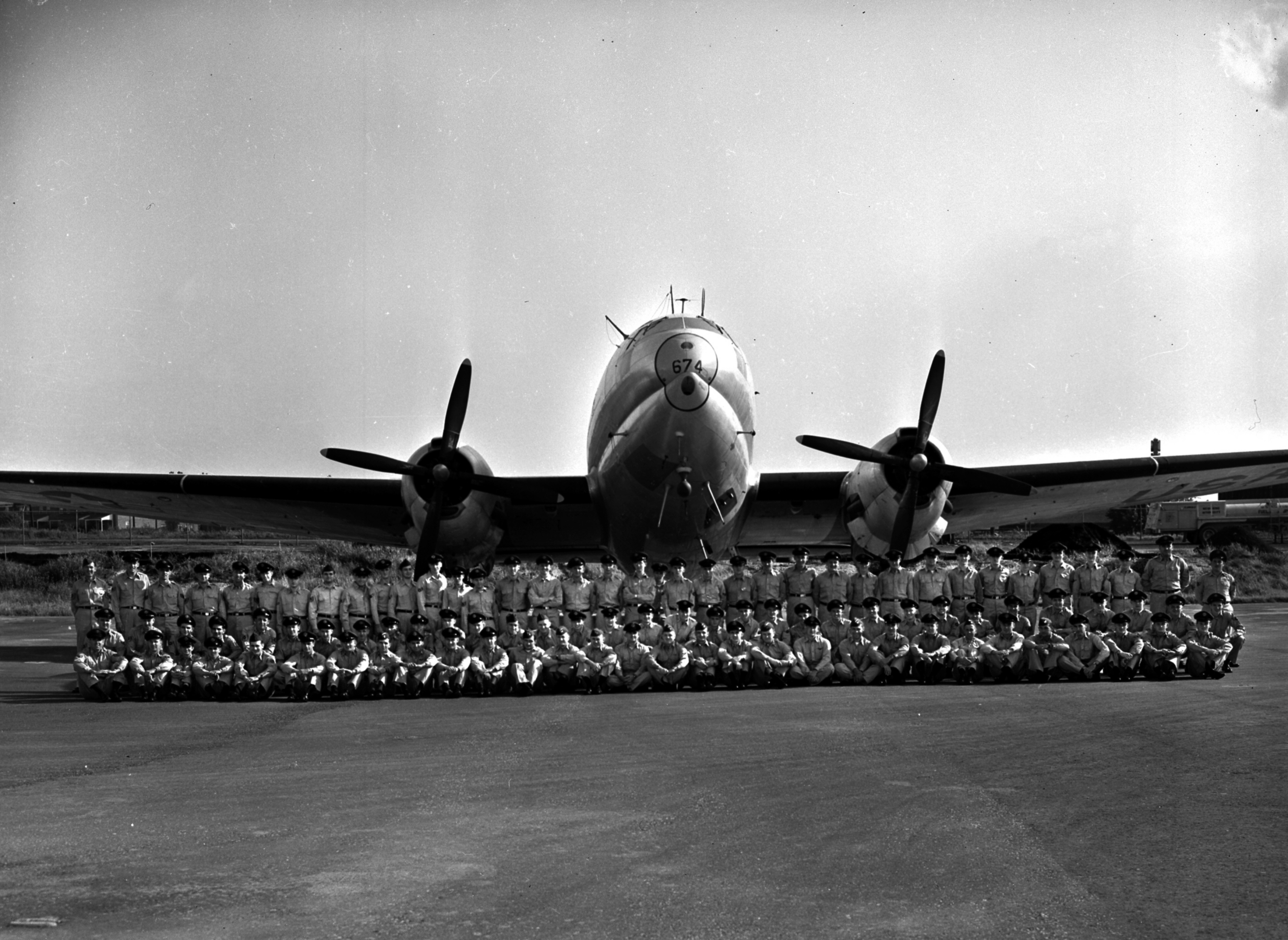
Members of 135th Air Supply Group with their C-46 Commando, 1955.

The Maryland Air National Guard's introduction to the world of special operations began when Air Force leaders decided to phase out active duty air commando units in 1954. Despite the decision, there was still a need to maintain a limited number of crews and aircraft to support unconventional warfare missions. After lengthy deliberations, the Air Force decided in 1955 to establish four special air warfare units within the Air National Guard: the 129th Air Resupply Group in California, the 130th in West Virginia, the 143d in Rhode Island, and the 135th in Maryland.

The 135th Air Resupply Squadron was established in September 1955 as a new Maryland Air National Guard unit with no previous United States Air Force history or lineage by the National Guard Bureau. Activated on 10 September at Harbor Field, Baltimore, Maryland, the squadron was assigned to the 135th Air Resupply Group, allocated to Military Air Transport Service (MATS), and equipped with C-46D Commando transports.

The 135th was designated at the time as a special operations unit that supported USAF unconventional warfare (guerrilla warfare), direct action (commando-type raids), strategic reconnaissance (intelligence gathering), and psychological operations. The C-46 was supplemented by SA-16 Albatross amphibious aircraft beginning in 1956. The SA-16 (later redesignated HU-16) completely replaced the C-46s in late 1958. Training for water landings with the SA-16 was extremely hazardous. To make matters worse, doctrine required pilots to land their aircraft on water at night, with no landing lights. Night water landings were practiced at Patuxent River Naval Air Station in southern Maryland. Three crewmen were killed when their plane crashed while attempting a water landing in May 1956.

Ultimately, the 135th's mission included counterinsurgency, military civic action, psychological operations, tactical air operations, and unconventional warfare. In addition to blacked-out water landings, the SA-16 crews practiced pulling personnel from the ground by means of the Fulton Recovery System, which retired Col. Richard T. Lynch, a former 135th commander, described as being "like bungee jumping in reverse."

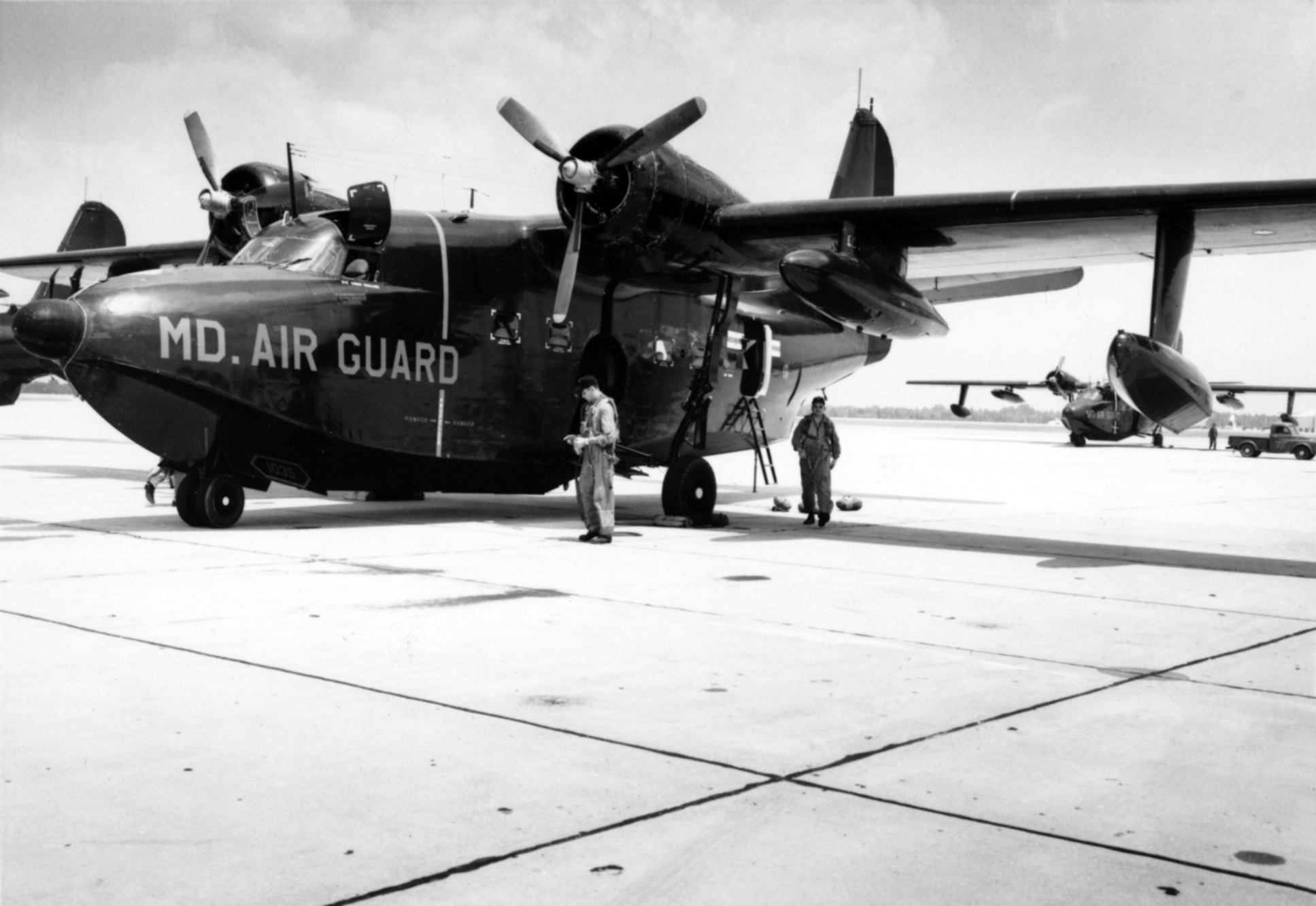
135th Air Commando Squadron HU-16B Albatross in the early 1960s

Exercise Swamp Rat followed a fairly typical training scenario. In October 1959, nine Maryland SA-16s flew to Fort Bragg, North Carolina, to work with soldiers of the 77th Special Forces Group. The paratroopers and their equipment were loaded aboard the SA-16s and dropped near the swamps of Fort Stewart, Georgia. 135th crews then flew resupply missions for the troops and extracted them when their mission was complete.

In 1960, it relocated to the south side of the Martin Company Airport (now the Martin State Airport) in Middle River, Maryland. It was reassigned to Tactical Air Command in 1962 and re-designated as Air Commando unit, following the revival of an active duty air commando unit at Hurlburt Field, Florida in line with President John F. Kennedy's initiative to bolster the United States military special forces during the early involvement in the Vietnam War.

In 1963, the 135th added U-10 Super Couriers to its inventory. The U-10s were used for infiltration, extraction, and psychological operations. These aircraft were temporarily replaced by U-6 Beavers from 1965 to 1967, due to a need for U-10s in Vietnam. In 1963, the 135th participated in Exercise Swift Strike III, one of the largest military maneuvers since World War II. During the exercise, the unit not only flew a variety of special air warfare missions, but received an operational readiness inspection from Tactical Air Command to boot.

The 135th also worked with U.S. intelligence agencies. A common mission was to pick up agents in training, fly a zig-zag course to make sure they didn't know where they were headed, then have them parachute out over western Maryland. The trainees then had to make their way to Patuxent with only the resources they carried – sometimes taking as much as six weeks to do so. The 135th would then fly down to "extract" the trainees and bring them home.

The unit's loudspeaker-equipped U-10s were used to broadcast orders to student protesters at the University of Maryland during demonstrations in 1971; this was their only actual operational use by the 135th.

It remained a special operations-type unit until 1971, when it was reorganized as a tactical air support unit. In this role, it was tasked with providing Forward Air Controllers to direct air strikes in support of troops on the ground.

=== Tactical Airlift ===
In 1977, it was again reorganized, this time as a tactical airlift unit as part of a general program to upgrade Air National Guard units. Was assigned the C-7A Caribou light transport, the aircraft being Vietnam War veterans. In 1980, the unit converted to the C-130B Hercules. In 1981, it moved across the field to join other Maryland Air National Guard units based on the north side of the field. The military facilities are named Warfield Air National Guard Base. During the early 1990s, the 135th participated in humanitarian relief efforts in Somalia, peacekeeping and humanitarian relief in Bosnia, the U.S. intervention in Haiti and the enforcement of U.N. sanctions against Iraq during the 1990s.

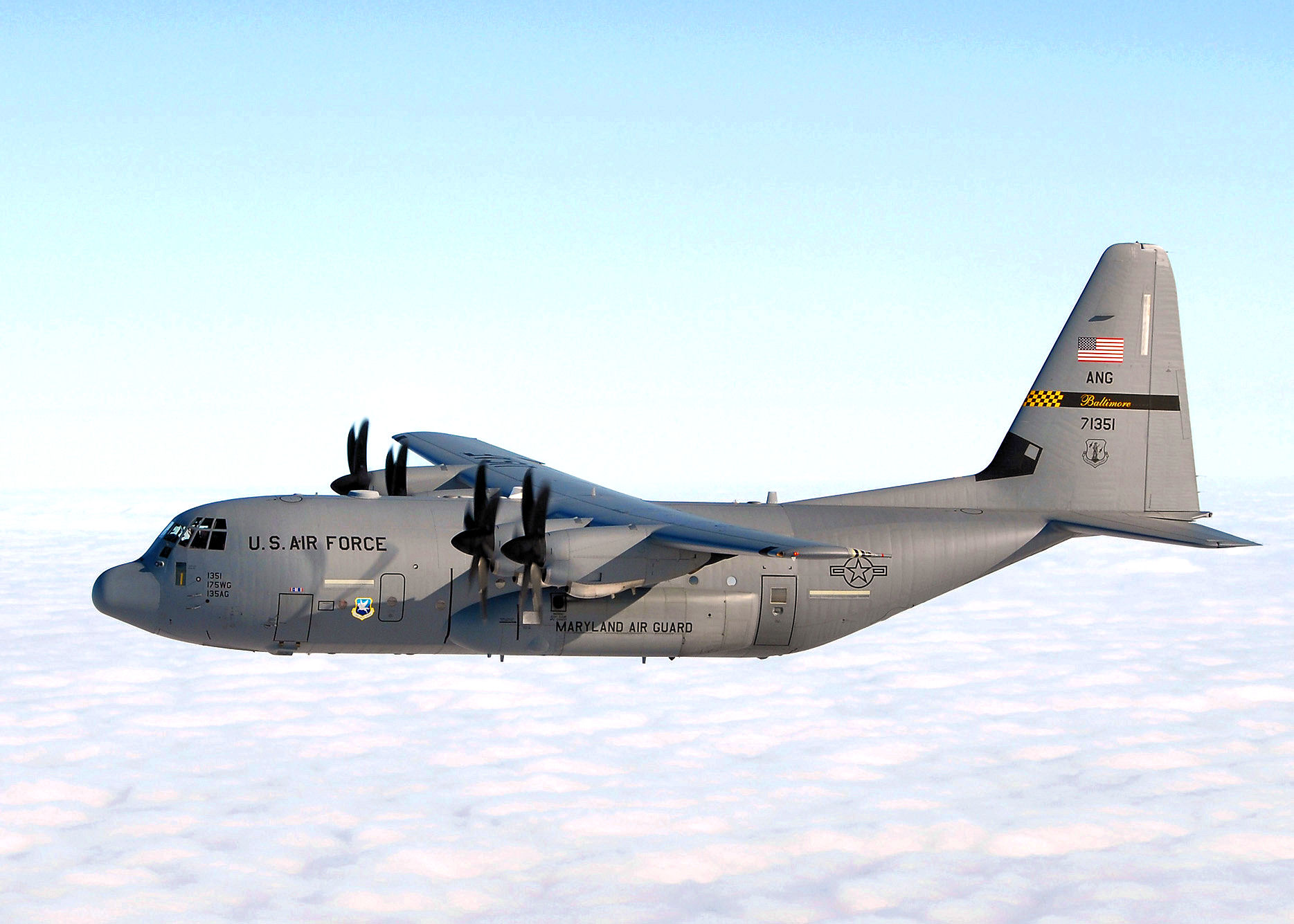
135th Airlift Squadron C-130J 97-1351

In mid-1996, the Air Force, in response to budget cuts and changing world situations, began experimenting with Air Expeditionary organizations. The Air Expeditionary Force concept was developed that would mix Active-Duty, Reserve and Air National Guard elements into a combined force. Instead of entire permanent units deploying as "Provisional" as in the 1991 Gulf War, Expeditionary units are composed of "aviation packages" from several wings, including active-duty Air Force, the Air Force Reserve Command and the Air National Guard, would be married together to carry out the assigned deployment rotation.

In 1999, it dedicated its first C-130J, the latest and most advanced version of the venerable transport. The 135th had played a major role in the test and evaluation of the aircraft and its procedures and was the first fully equipped C-130J unit in the U.S. Air Force.

In February 2000, the 135th Expeditionary Airlift Squadron (135th EAS) was first formed from 135th personnel and aircraft and deployed to Lambaréné Airport, Gabon, for Exercise Gabon 2000, with the objective of increasing the capacity of ECCAS states in the field of peacekeeping and conflict prevention and management. This exercise represented a direct application of the French RECAMP-concept (reinforcement of African peacekeeping capacities).

BRAC 2005 saw the 8 C-130J aircraft of the squadron being transferred to 314th Airlift group, Little Rock Air Force base. In 2011, the first C-27J Spartan light transport was received. The squadron will obtain four of the C-27Js.

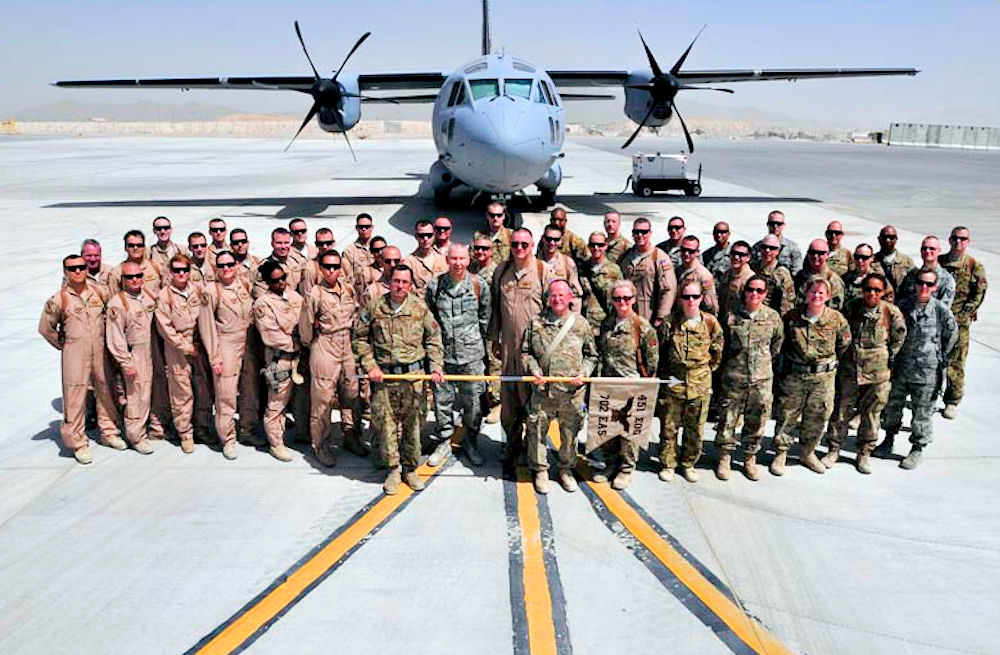
702d Expeditionary Airlift Squadron, Kandahar Airfield, Afghanistan, 2012.

Beginning in July 2011, the 135th along with the Ohio Air National Guard 164th Expeditionary Airlift Squadron began rotational deployments for joint operations of the C-27J from Kandahar Airfield, Afghanistan as the 702d Expeditionary Airlift Squadron. The 702d flew the two aircraft on 3,200 missions, moved 1,400 tons of cargo, transported 25,000 passengers and executed 71 airdrops, according to Air Force data.

In June 2012, operations of the 702d were suspended by the Air Force and returned to the United States. Originally, C-27J aircraft were supposed to remain in theater through 2014, but the Air Force decided to bring all of the aircraft back to the U.S. before the end of July after it submitted its 2013 budget proposal, which recommended terminating the C-27J and retiring the aircraft.

In 2013, the Air Force divested itself of the C-27J program. An inactivation ceremony was held at Warfield ANGB on 27 September 2013, and the 135th Airlift Squadron was scheduled to officially inactivate on 30 September, but for undetermined reasons, an inactivation request was never processed.

=== Intelligence ===
Although scheduled to inactivate on 30 September 2013, an organizational change request to that effect was apparently never processed and the unit remained on the books as an active part of the Maryland Air National Guard, albeit without assigned personnel or aircraft. As part of an increased emphasis on cyber warfare, the Maryland Air Guard gained a number of new units supporting this mission set, including a new intelligence squadron. This squadron was initially formed as a detachment of the 175th Wing. In keeping with Air Force historical policy, which, in part, emphasizes keeping units with long histories on the active rolls if possible, an organizational change request was submitted to the National Guard Bureau in 2014 requesting the 135th Airlift Squadron be reorganized and redesignated as the 135th Intelligence Squadron. While the request was still pending approval, the detachment began unofficially using the new designation. On 1 May 2016, the placeholder detachment was inactivated and its personnel became the 135th Intelligence Squadron.

== Lineage ==
- Constituted as the 135th Air Resupply Squadron and allotted to the Air National Guard

Activated and extended federal recognition on 10 September 1955
Redesignated 135th Troop Carrier Squadron (Medium) on 1 July 1958
Redesignated 135th Air Commando Squadron on 1 July 1962
Redesignated 135th Special Operations Squadron on 15 June 1968
Redesignated 135th Tactical Air Support Squadron on 1 July 1971
Redesignated 135th Tactical Airlift Squadron on 1 July 1977
Redesignated 135th Airlift Squadron on 16 March 1992
Redesignated 135th Intelligence Squadron on 1 May 2016

=== Assignments ===
- 135th Air Resupply Group, 10 September 1955
- Maryland Air National Guard, 1 July 1958
- 135th Air Commando Group (later 135th Special Operations Group, 135th Tactical Air Support Group, 135th Tactical Airlift Group, 135th Airlift Group), 1 July * 175th Operations Group, 1 April 1996
- 135th Airlift Group, 1 May 1999
- 175th Wing, 1 May 2016

=== Stations ===
- Baltimore Municipal Airport, Maryland, 10 September 1955
- Martin State Airport (later Warfield Air National Guard Base), Maryland, 1 July 1960 – present

=== Aircraft ===
- C-46D Commando, 1955-1958
- HU-16A Albatross, 1956-1962
- HU-16B Albatross, 1957-1971
- U-10 Super Courier, 1963-1972
- U-6A Beaver, 1965-1967
- O-2A Super Skymaster, 1971-1977
- C-7A Caribou, 1977-1980
- C-130B Hercules, 1980-1989
- C-130E Hercules, 1989-2000
- C-130J Hercules, 1999-2011
- C-27J Spartan, 2011-2013
