= 175th Wing =

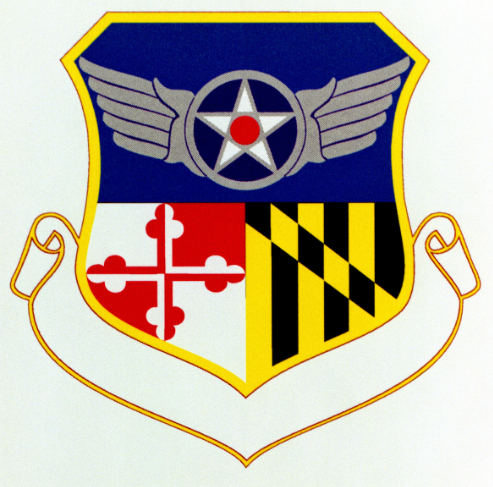
175th Wing

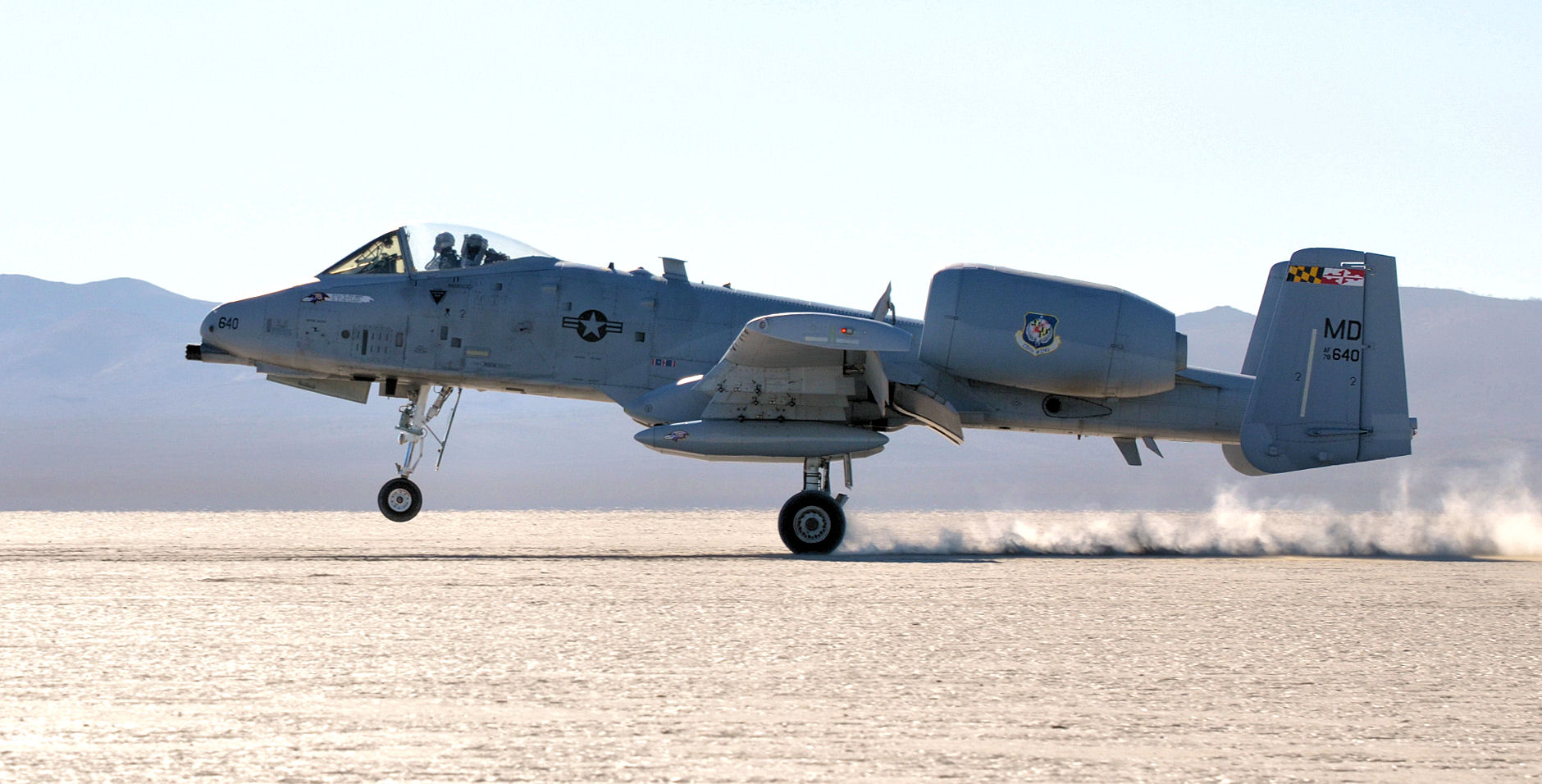
- An A-10C assigned to the 104th Fighter Squadron
- Active: 1962–present
- Country: United States
- Allegiance: Maryland
- Branch: Air National Guard
- Type: Wing
- Role: Cyberspace
- Size: Approximately 1,500 full-time and traditional part-time members
- Part of: Maryland Air National Guard
- Garrison/HQ: Warfield Air National Guard Base, Middle River, Maryland
- Motto: Librati In Promptu (Latin for 'Poised in Readiness')
- Decorations: Air Force Meritorious Unit Award; Air Force Outstanding Unit Award

Commanders
- Current commander: Brig. Gen. Joed I. Carbonell-López

Insignia
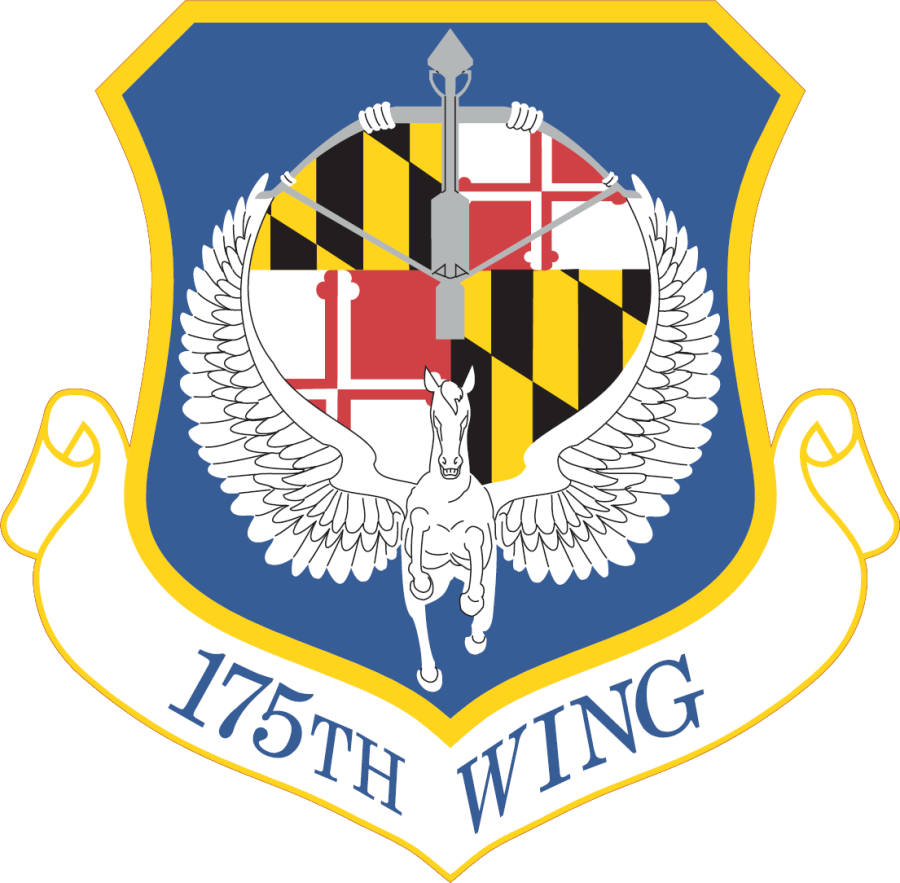
- 175th Wing emblem (Note: Approved on 23 August 1996. Symbolism: Blue and yellow are the Air Force colors. Blue alludes to the sky, the primary theater of Air Force Operations. Yellow refers to the sun and the excellence required of Air Force personnel. The crossbow symbolizes the fighter mission and the Pegasus denotes the airlift mission. The representation of the Maryland state flag reflects the consolidation of these two missions within the wing and also indicates the unit's home location.)

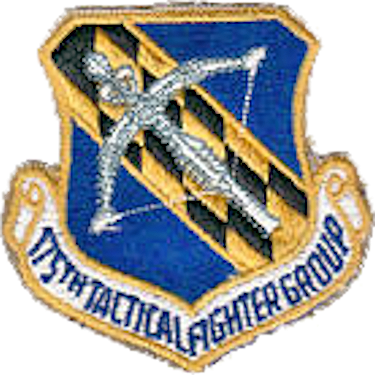
- Patch with 175th Tactical Fighter Group emblem

The 175th Wing is a unit of the Maryland Air National Guard, stationed at Warfield Air National Guard Base, Middle River, Maryland. If activated to federal service, components of the Wing are gained by the two separate major commands of the United States Air Force: Air Combat Command and United States Air Forces in Europe.

The former 104th Fighter Squadron, assigned to the wing's former 175th Operations Group, is a descendant of the 104th Observation Squadron, established on 29 June 1921. It is one of the 29 original National Guard Observation Squadrons of the United States Army National Guard formed before World War II. It was the oldest unit in the Maryland Air National Guard, having over 90 years of service to the state and nation.

== Mission ==
The 175th Wing is a composite unit and has two active USAF gaining commands: the Air Combat Command for its cyber unit, and United States Air Forces in Europe for its 235th Civil Engineer Flight.

The 175th Cyberspace Operations Group is the wing's cyber unit, and includes three subordinate cyberspace operations squadrons and an operations support squadron. The wing also includes support units, including security forces, engineers, communications, logistics, and administrative support functions. Approximately 1,500 full-time and traditional part-time members of the Maryland Air National Guard are assigned to the 175th Wing.

The 175th Wing has both federal and state missions.

- Federal: In peacetime, the 175th Wing prepares for wartime taskings and to augment active military forces. In wartime, provides cyberspace operations capability to meet the needs of combatant commanders worldwide.
- State: Provides assistance to state authorities during natural disasters, civil disturbances and other emergencies at the call of the governor and provides combat and support forces for homeland defense.

== Units ==
The 175th Wing is composed of the following units:

- 175th Cyberspace Operations Group

175th Cyberspace Operations Squadron
275th Cyberspace Operations Squadron
276th Cyberspace Operations Squadron
275th Operations Support Squadron

- 175th Mission Support Group

175th Civil Engineer Squadron
175th Force Support Squadron
175th Security Forces Squadron
175th Logistics Readiness Squadron
175th Communications Flight

- 175th Medical Group
- 135th Intelligence Squadron
- 175th Comptroller Flight
- 235th Civil Engineer Flight

== History ==
On 1 October 1962, the Maryland Air National Guard's 175th Tactical Fighter Group was federally recognized and activated by the National Guard Bureau. The 104th TFS becoming the group's flying squadron. Other squadrons assigned into the group were the 175th Headquarters, 175th Material Squadron, 175th Combat Support Squadron, and the 175th USAF Dispensary. Equipped with F-86H Sabres, the 175th TFG was operationally gained by Tactical Air Command.

=== Tactical Air Command ===
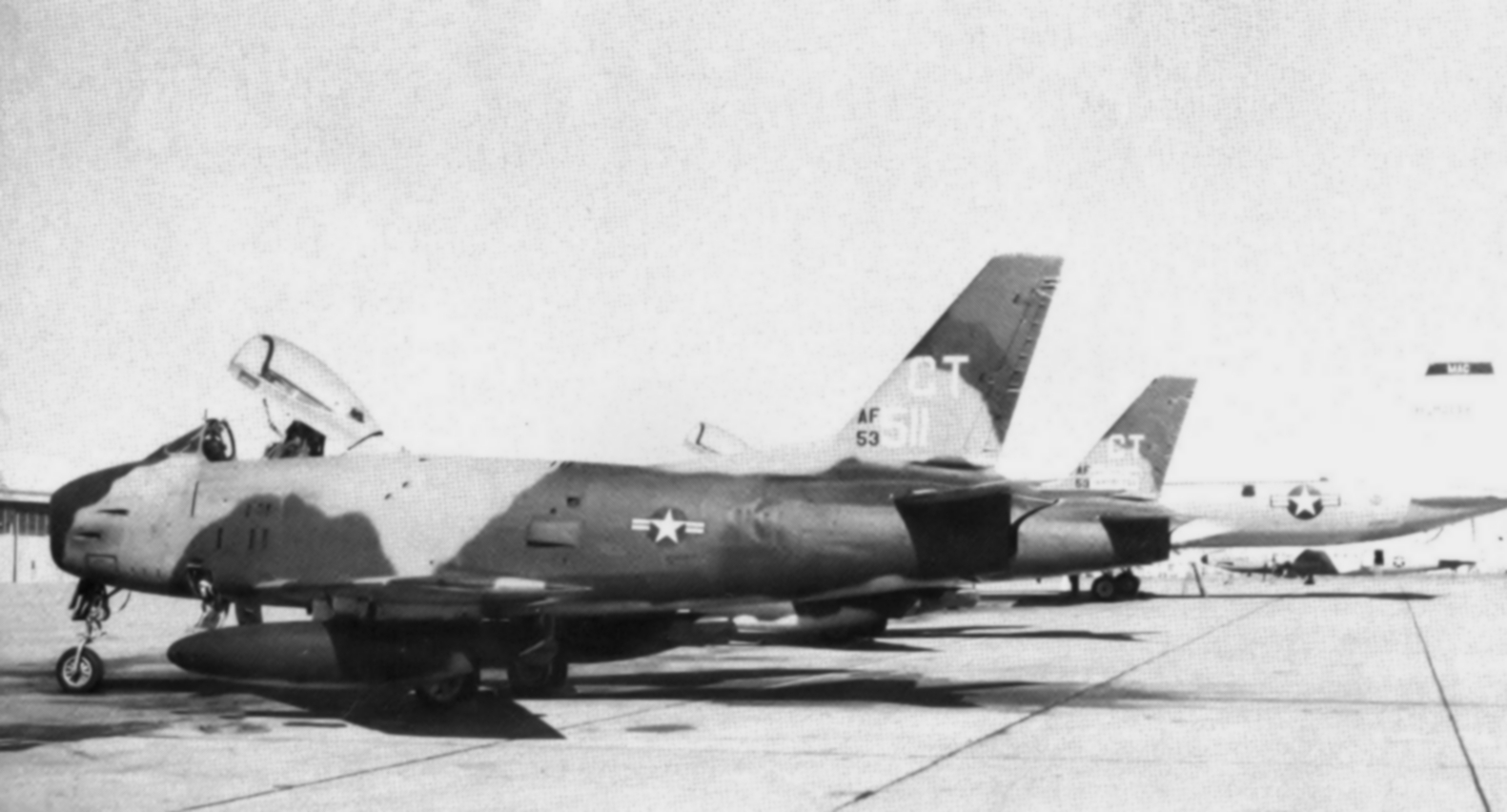
104th Fighter- Interceptor Squadron F-86Hs at Cannon AFB during the 1968 Pueblo Crisis (Note: Aircraft are North American F-86H-10-NH Sabres, serial 53–1511 in foreground, tail of serial 53-1255 also shown, painted in Southeast Asian camouflage. 53-1511 is now on display at Museum of Aviation, Robins Air Force Base, Georgia.)

On 13 May 1968 the 175th Tactical Fighter Group was federalized and ordered to active service. It was transferred to Cannon Air Force Base, New Mexico along with the NY ANG 139th Tactical Fighter Squadron and 174th Tactical Fighter Squadron.

At Cannon, the 175th was assigned to the 140th Tactical Fighter Wing, but the group's headquarters and maintenance squadron were reduced to zero manning and their personnel assigned elsewhere within the wing, including the wing headquarters, 4429th Combat Crew Training Squadron, and 4429th Field Maintenance Squadron. Only the 104th Tactical Fighter Squadron continued to operate as a unit per se. At Cannon, the squadron trained active Air Force pilots in forward air controller duties. The unit did not deploy overseas. While at Cannon, the 104th was assigned the CT tail code. The 175th returned to Maryland state control on 20 December 1968 after the training mission was cancelled by the Air Force.

In 1970 the 175th TFG was realigned from a Tactical Fighter mission when the F-86H Sabres were transferred after being with the 104th TFS for thirteen years. The 175th was one of the last ANG units to fly the F-86. The Sabres, however, were not retired, but instead transferred to the United States Navy which used them both as target drones and as MiG simulators for TOP GUN aggressor training. The F-86H had a similar size, shape, and performance as the MiG-17 fighter then being encountered over North Vietnam, and many a Navy F-4 pilot was "killed" by a F-86H Sabre during these mock battles.

In return, the 175th TFG received Cessna A-37 Dragonfly counter-insurgency aircraft. In the Vietnam War, the A-37 was a very effective ground support aircraft that was simple to operate, maintain and fly. The mission of the 175th was to train in the aircraft to support Air Force and Army special forces personnel and units. In 1974, after the end of American participation in Vietnam, the unit began supporting the Military Assistance Program (MAP) by supplying training to Latin American Air Forces. In addition, in the OA-37 configuration, the aircraft was used as a Forward Air Control (FAC) aircraft, that replaced the aging O-2 Skymaster. In the OA-37 configuration, the aircraft was equipped with small rocket pods, usually with smoke or white phosphorus warheads used for target marking.

In 1979, the 175th was the first Air National Guard unit to receive the A-10 Thunderbolt II ground support aircraft. The 175th received brand new A-10A Thunderbolt II attack aircraft from the factory in Hagerstown, Maryland.

=== Modern era ===
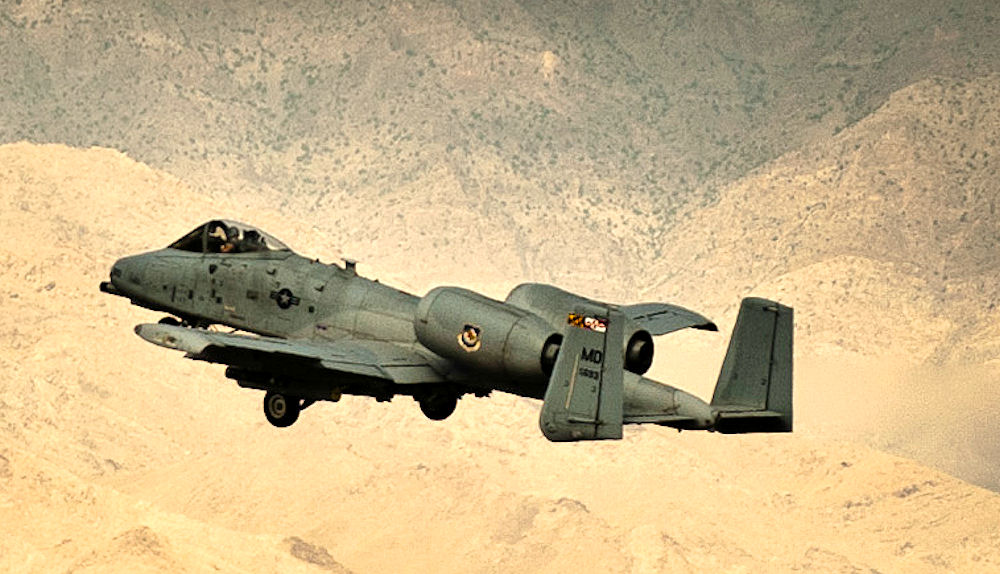
A-10 Thunderbolt II assigned to the 104th Expeditionary Fighter Squadron taking off at Bagram Airfield, Afghanistan, 28 June 2012.

Early in the 1990s with the declared end of the Cold War and the continued decline in military budgets, the Air Force restructured to meet changes in strategic requirements, decreasing personnel, and a smaller infrastructure. The 175th adopted the new USAF "Objective Organization" in early 1992, with the word "tactical" being eliminated from its designation and becoming the 175th Fighter Group. Tactical Air Command was inactivated on 1 June, being replaced by the new Air Combat Command (ACC).

On 15 June 1996, in accordance with the Air Force "One Wing, One Base" directive, the units of the 135th Airlift Group and 175th Fighter Group merged to form the 175th Wing. The 175th Wing, became a composite organization with an Air Combat Command-gained fighter unit, an Air Mobility Command-gained airlift unit, a United States Air Forces in Europe-gained civil engineer flight, and, from 2006 to 2016, a network warfare squadron.

In mid-1996, the Air Force, in response to budget cuts, and changing world situations, began experimenting with Air Expeditionary organizations. The Air Expeditionary Force (AEF) concept was developed that would mix Active-Duty, Reserve and Air National Guard elements into a combined force. Instead of entire permanent units deploying as "Provisional" as in the 1991 Gulf War, Expeditionary units are composed of "aviation packages" from several wings, including active-duty Air Force, the Air Force Reserve Command and the Air National Guard, would be married together to carry out the assigned deployment rotation.

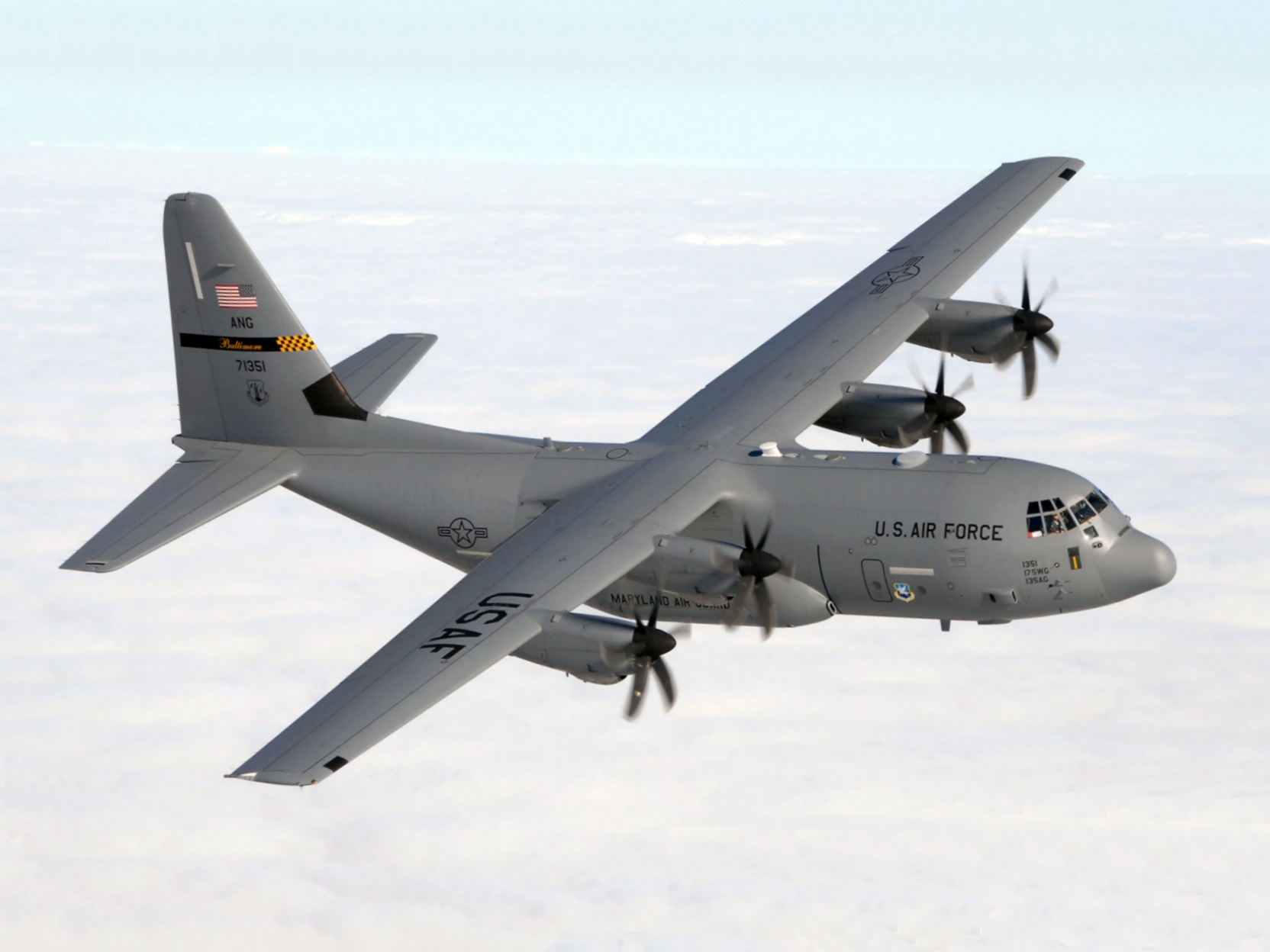
C-130J Hercules from the 135th Airlift Squadron (Note: Aircraft is Lockheed Martin C-130J Hercules, serial 97-1351.)

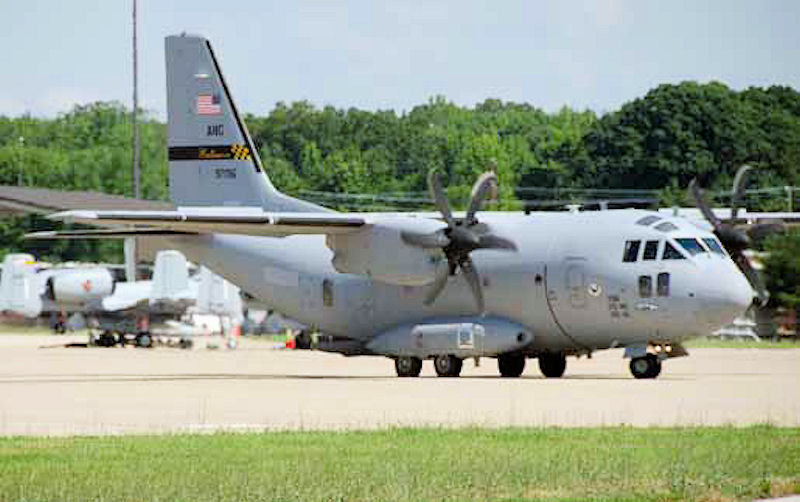
135th Airlift Squadron - C-27J Spartan

The wing has been deeply involved in fielding the latest Air Force aircraft. In 1999, it dedicated its first C-130J Hercules, the latest and most advanced version of the venerable transport. The 135th had played a major role in the test and evaluation of the aircraft and its procedures and was the first fully equipped C-130J unit in the U.S. Air Force. The wing was also selected to be the Air Force's lead unit in converting to the new "precision engagement" A-10C Thunderbolt II. Wing personnel were deeply involved in the test and evaluation process and in September 2007, the 104th Fighter Squadron became the first unit to take the A-10C into combat, when it deployed to Al Asad Air Base, Iraq.

Following the 11 September 2001 terrorist attacks, members of the 175th Wing repeatedly volunteered or were mobilized to take part in the global war on terrorism. From January to June 2003, the 104th Expeditionary Fighter Squadron was formed and deployed to Bagram Air Base, Afghanistan, where it flew strikes against Taliban and al Qaeda forces and earned the distinction of being the longest-deployed Air National Guard fighter squadron at Bagram.

When Hurricanes Katrina and Rita struck the Gulf Coast in 2005, the 175th Wing was among the first to respond, flying 42 relief missions and deploying nearly 200 troops to support recovery and relief efforts in Louisiana and Mississippi. From 2006 to 2008, numerous wing members deployed to the U.S.-Mexican border as part of Operation Jump Start, the National Guard mission supporting the U.S. Border Patrol.

BRAC 2005 determined to realign Warfield Air National Guard Base by distributing the 175th Wing's eight C-130J aircraft to the California Air National Guard's 146th Airlift Wing at Channel Islands Air National Guard Station, CA (four aircraft), and the Rhode Island Air National Guard's 143d Airlift Wing at Quonset Point Air National Guard Station, RI (four aircraft). In return, the 135th Airlift Squadron of the 175th Wing would receive the new C-27J Spartan Joint Cargo Aircraft.

The A-10C's and the 104th Fighter Sq, 175th Maintenance Group deployed to Kandahar, Afghanistan in the morning hours of January through April 2010, in support of Operation Enduring Freedom.

The Maryland Air National Guard marked its 90th year of operation in 2011. The year saw big changes for the unit with the transition from C-130J Hercules to the new C-27J Spartan Joint Cargo Aircraft that would allow the unit to continue airlift transport capabilities around the world.

The unit saw the completion of the $7.9 million 12 bay fire station, centrally located on base to handle any aircraft emergencies. Joint HQ office provided support to more than 200 full-time members that were mobilized in 2011. The 175th Wing performed humanitarian and domestic operations as seen in the responses to the earthquake in Haiti and Hurricane Irene. Three lifesaving humanitarian airlift missions for 28 patients were performed as part of Joint Task Force Haiti. During Hurricane Irene, the wing established a receiving, staging and shipping warehouse operation to support various government agencies in distributing 195 pallets of water and food to Maryland locations throughout the state. The wing conducted operations in Cyprus, Afghanistan, Iraq, Africa, Kyrgyzstan, Germany, Kuwait, Qatar, United Arab Emirates, Haiti, Estonia, Cuba and Puerto Rico.

Beginning in July 2011, the 135th, along with the Ohio Air National Guard's 164th Airlift Squadron, began rotational deployments for joint operations of the C-27J from Kandahar Airfield, Afghanistan as the 702d Expeditionary Airlift Squadron. The 702d EAS flew the two aircraft on 3,200 missions, moved 1,400 tons of cargo, transported 25,000 passengers and executed 71 airdrops, according to Air Force data.

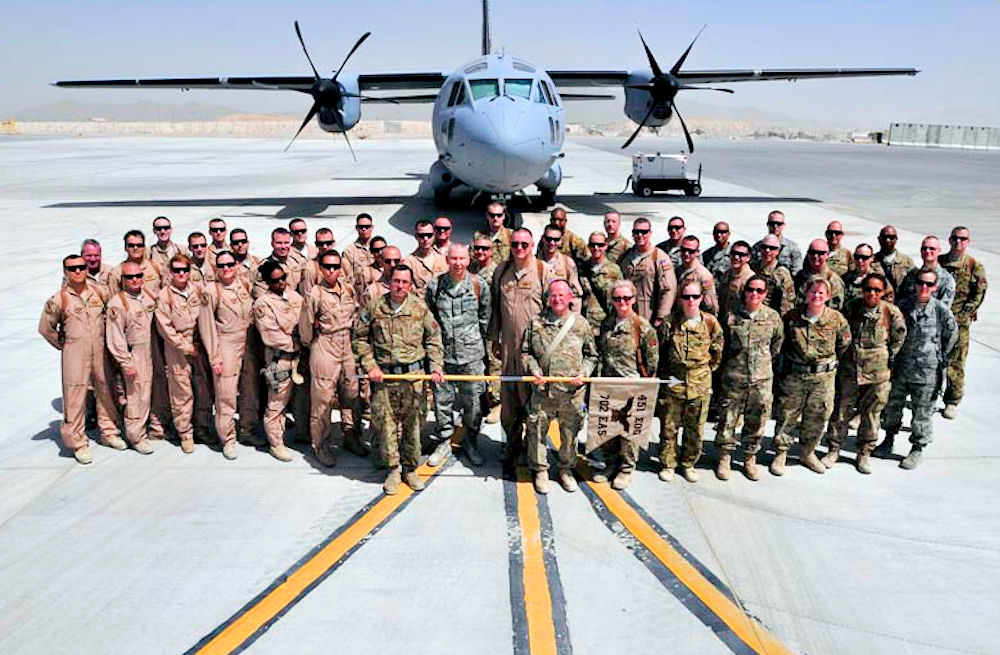
702d Expeditionary Airlift Squadron, Kandahar Airfield, Afghanistan, 2012.

On 26 January 2012, the Department of Defense announced plans to retire all 38 USAF C-27Js on order due to conclusions that (1) the USAF possessed excess intratheater airlift capacity and (2) budgetary pressures on USAF, especially with respect to maintaining adequate funding for the fielding of new aircraft such as the service's F-35A Lightning II joint strike fighter and the KC-46 Pegasus air refueling aircraft, which did not permit funding for so-called "niche" aircraft such as the C-27J. C-27J duties were to be met by the C-130. On 23 March 2012, the USAF announced the C-27J's retirement in fiscal year 2013 after determining other program's budgetary needs and requirement changes for a new Pacific strategy.

In June 2012, operations of the 702d EAS were suspended by the Air Force and returned to the United States. Originally, C-27J aircraft were supposed to remain in theater through 2014, but the Air Force decided to bring all of the aircraft back to the U.S. before the end of July after it submitted its 2013 budget proposal, which recommended terminating the C-27J and retiring all aircraft from USAF (e.g., Air National Guard) service.

The A-10C's and the 104th Fighter Sq, 175th Maintenance Group deployed to Bagram, Afghanistan in the morning hours of April through July 2012, in support of Operation Enduring Freedom.

On 30 September 2013, an inactivation ceremony was held, and by the end of 2014, all personnel had been transferred to other units or left the Maryland ANG. An organizational change request to inactivate the unit was never processed however, and the unit remained on the active rolls until 2016. At that time, the group headquarters and most of its subordinate units was inactivated, and the 135th Airlift Squadron was redesignated as the 135th Intelligence Squadron.

On 18 April 2015, the 175th was state activated to assist law enforcement at the Baltimore Riots (Ribbon: Baltimore Rally) for the next several days.

The A-10C's and the 104th Fighter Sq, 175th Maintenance Group deployed to Incirlik, AB Turkey in the morning hours of Oct through Feb of 2017, in support of Operation Inherent Resolve.

The A-10C's and the 104th Fighter Sq, 175th Maintenance Group deployed to Bagram, Afghanistan in the morning hours of Jan through Apr of 2019, in support of Operation Resolute Support.

The same organizational change request that inactivated the 135th Airlift Group also stood up a new cyber operations group. The 175th Cyberspace Operations group consists of three subordinate cyberspace operations squadrons (one of which had existed as a separate squadron since 2006) and an operations support squadron.

During the summer of 2025, the 175th Wing saw a majority of their A-10s retired and or handed down to other Fighter Wings. Finally, on 23 September 2025, the last two A-10s (79-0175 and 79-0104) departed Warfield Air National Guard Base, marking the end of the A-10 era for the 175th Wing. A-10s 79-0088 and 79-0087 are both now stored in aviation museums, 088 being stored at the Air Mobility Command Museum, DE and 087 being stored at the Hagerstown Aviation Museum, MD. As of 2025, Maryland is the only state in the U.S. without an Air National Guard flying mission.

=== Lineage ===
- Established as the 175th Tactical Fighter Group and allotted to Maryland ANG in 1962

Extended federal recognition on 1 October 1962
Federalized and ordered to active service on 8 April 1968
Released from active duty and returned to Maryland control in 12 April 1968
Federalized and ordered to active service on 13 May 1968
Released from active duty and returned to Maryland control on 20 December 1968
Redesignated 175th Fighter Group on 16 Mar 1992
Redesignated 175th Wing on 1 April 1996

=== Assignments ===
- Maryland Air National Guard, 1 October 1962 – 6 April 1968

Gained by: Tactical Air Command

- 833rd Air Division, 7–12 April 1968
- Maryland Air National Guard, 13 April 1968 – 12 May 1968
- 833rd Air Division, 13 May 1968 – 31 May 1968
- 140th Tactical Fighter Wing, 1 June 1968 – 20 December 1968
- Maryland Air National Guard, 21 December 1968 – present

Gained by: Tactical Air Command
Gained by: Air Combat Command, 1 June 1992
Re-organized 1 April 1996 with components gained by:

Air Combat Command, 104th Fighter Squadron
Air Mobility Command, 135th Airlift Group
United States Air Forces in Europe: 235th Civil Engineer Flight

Re-organized 2016 with components gained by:

Air Combat Command, All components other than 235th Civil Engineer Flight
United States Air Forces in Europe: 235th Civil Engineer Flight

=== Components ===
- 175th Operations Group, 15 March 1992 – 23 September 2025
  - 104th Fighter Squadron, 1 October 1962 – 23 September 2025
- 175th Cyberspace Operations Group, 2016–present
  - 175th Network Warfare (later Cyberspace Operations) Squadron, 2006–present
  - 275th Cyberspace Operations Squadron, 2016–present
  - 276th Cyberspace Operations Squadron, 2016–present
  - 275th Operations Support Squadron, 2016-present

=== Stations ===
- Martin State Airport, Baltimore, Maryland, 1 October 1962 – 9 June 1968
- Cannon Air Force Base, New Mexico, 10 June 1968 – 19 December 1968
- Martin State Airport, Baltimore, Maryland, 20 December 1968 – present

Designated: Warfield Air National Guard Base, Maryland, 1985

=== Aircraft ===
- F-86H Sabre, 1962–1970
- A-37B Dragonfly, 1970–1980
- A-10A Thunderbolt II, 1979–2007
- C-130E Hercules, 1996–2000
- C-130J Hercules, 1999–2011
- C-27J Spartan, 2011–2013
- A-10C Thunderbolt II, 2007–2025

=== Decorations ===
- Air Force Meritorious Unit Award

Awarded: 1 Apr - 31 Dec 2021

- Air Force Outstanding Unit Award

Awarded: 1999–2001; 1998–1999; 1996; 1992–1994; 2006–2007; 2007–2009; 01 Jan 18 – 31 Dec 19; 01 Jan 20 – 31 Mar 21
