= Martin State Airport =

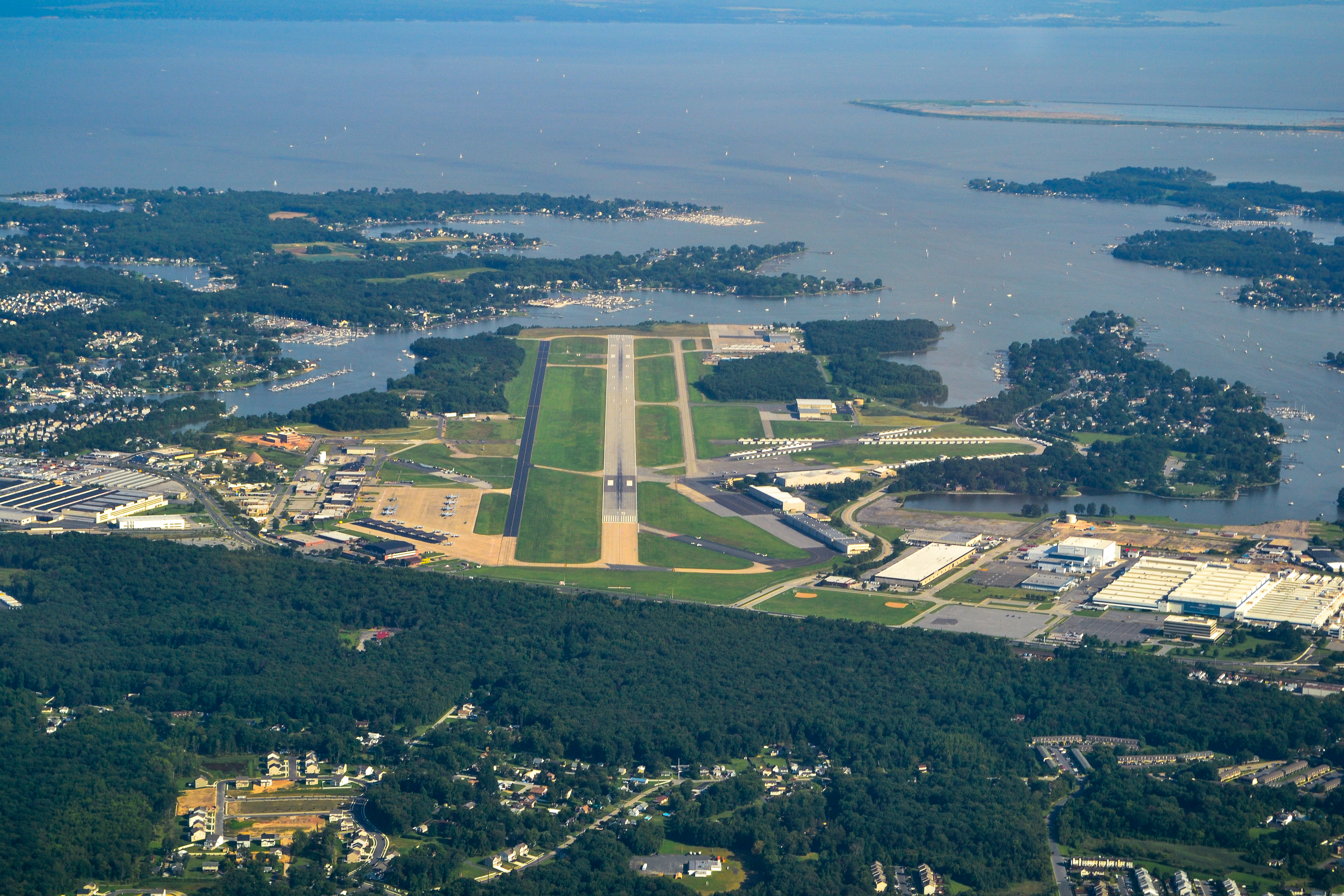
- IATA: MTN; ICAO: KMTN; FAA LID: MTN

Summary
- Airport type: Public
- Owner: Maryland Aviation Administration
- Serves: Baltimore, Maryland
- Location: Middle River, Maryland
- Elevation AMSL: 21 ft (6.4 m)
- Coordinates: 39°19′32″N 076°24′50″W
- Website: MartinStateAirport.com

Map
- Location of airport in Maryland / United States MTN (the United States)

Runways
Direction	Length		Surface
Direction	ft	m	Surface
15/33	6,997	2,132	Asphalt

Helipads
Number	Length		Surface
Number	ft	m	Surface
H1	65	20	Concrete

Statistics (2022)
- Aircraft operations: 87,130
- Based aircraft: 241
- Source: Federal Aviation Administration

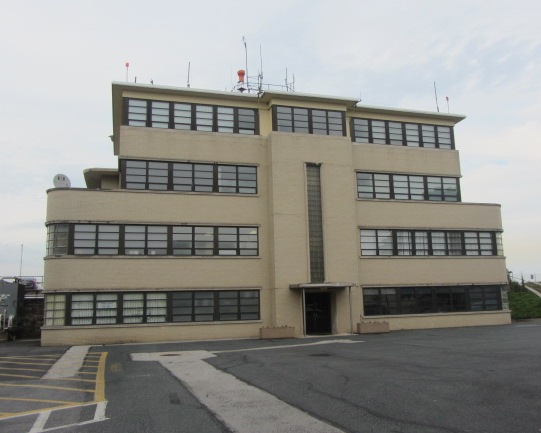
Martin State Airport terminal

Martin State Airport (IATA: MTN, ICAO: KMTN, FAA LID: MTN) is a joint civil-military public use airport located nine nautical miles (10 mi; 17 km) east of the central business district of Baltimore, in Baltimore County, Maryland, United States. The facility is located within the census-designated place of Middle River on Maryland State Highway 150 (Eastern Boulevard), near the intersection of Maryland State Highway 700 (Martin Boulevard). The Maryland Aviation Administration operates the airport on behalf of the Maryland Department of Transportation. MTN is a general aviation relief airport.

== History ==
This was the former plant airport for the Glenn L. Martin Company which produced a large number of military aircraft at this location between the 1920s and 1960s. The Glenn L. Martin Maryland Aviation Museum and old seaplane ramps are located at the southeast corner of the airport.

In 1937, Glenn Martin proposed height restrictions around the airport because a new generation of large, heavy transports would be flying from its seaplane base. By 1945, Martin had built $5.5 million in structures on the field. The company attempted to sell the property to the City of Baltimore for $1 million, but the commissioner Robert O'Boneell said there was insufficient room for expansion. In 1974, Governor Marvin Mandel proposed to purchase the airport from Martin Marietta. The company formed a real-estate arm, Chesapeake Park Inc., with the former Baltimore County Council Chair Herry J. Bartenfelder to build residential and commercial real estate. Citizens of Essex opposed the use conversion, lending support to the State's purchase of the field for $9.4 million. In 1980, Port-A-Port T-hangars were purchased for general aviation use and lease. In the 1990s the airport was targeted as part of the Middle River Employment Center district to have MD route 43 highway extended from I-95 direct to the terminal through a series of wetland parcels.

== Military use ==
The Maryland Air National Guard's 175th Wing is a tenant activity at MTN which had locally based A-10C aircraft until its retirement in September 2025, leaving the 175th Wing as the only Air Guard unit without planes. The Air National Guard facility, converting into a dedicated Cybersecurity Wing is located on the northeast side of the field and is officially named Warfield Air National Guard Base.

== Facilities and aircraft ==
Martin State Airport covers an area of 747 acres (302 ha) at an elevation of 21 feet (6.4 m) above mean sea level. It has one asphalt paved runway designated 15/33 which is 6,997 by 180 feet (2,133 by 55 m). It also had one helipad with a 65 by 65 ft (20 by 20 m) concrete surface.

For the 12-month period ending October 11, 2022, the airport had 87,130 aircraft operations, an average of 239 per day: 94% general aviation, 2% military, and 3% air taxi. At that time there were 241 aircraft based at this airport: 163 single-engine, 13 multi-engine, 19 jet, 21 helicopter, 1 glider, and 24 military.

== Operations ==
Martin State Airport serves a wide variety of general aviation and commercial operators. It is home base to many helicopter operations, including local news helicopters WJZ Channel 13 and WBAL Channel 11; medevac services Express Care 1 and Helicopter Transport Services; and the aviation units for the Maryland State Police, Baltimore County Police, and Baltimore City Police. It is also the home base for Grandview Aviation, a private jet charter company with services and bases all over North America.

There is a wide variety of flight training activities at the airport's three flight schools: Middle River Aviation, First Class Flight Academy, and Brett Aviation.

== Cargo operations ==
Airlines	Destinations
AirNet	Atlanta-Fulton County, Charlotte, Bedford-Hanscom (MA)

== See also ==
- List of airports in Maryland
- Martin State Airport (MARC station)
- 175th Wing
